= Vauxhall Motors =

British car company

Vauxhall Motors Limited
- Logo since 2026
- Formerly: Alex Wilson and Company; Vauxhall Iron Works
- Type: Subsidiary
- Industry: Automotive
- Founded: 1857; 169 years ago
- Founder: Alexander Wilson
- Headquarters: Coventry, England, UK
- Number of locations: One manufacturing facility in the United Kingdom
- Area served: United Kingdom
- Key people: Florian Huettl (CEO); Eurig Drucn (MD)
- Products: Cars; Commercial vehicles
- Production output: 118,182 (2016 passenger cars)
- Services: Vehicle financing
- Revenue: ▼£3,162.8 million (2019)
- Operating income: ▲£70.7 million (2019)
- Net income: ▼£59.5 million (2019)
- Total assets: ▲£−127 million (2019)
- Total equity: ▲£−386.2 million (2019)
- Owners: General Motors (1925–2017); PSA Group (2017–2021); Stellantis (2021–present)
- Number of employees: 4,029 (2011)
- Parent: Opel Automobile GmbH
- Website: vauxhall.co.uk

Vauxhall Motors Limited (Note: /ˈvɒks(h)ɔːlˌ -əl/ VOKS-(h)awl, -əl; Company No. 00135767. Incorporated 12 May 1914, name changed from Vauxhall Motors Limited to General Motors UK Limited on 16 April 2008, reverted to Vauxhall Motors Limited on 18 September 2017.) is a British car company headquartered in Coventry, England. It sells passenger cars and electric and light commercial vehicles under the Vauxhall marque nationwide, and previously sold vans, buses, and trucks under the Bedford brand. It has been owned by Stellantis since the group’s formation in January 2021, having become part of its predecessor, the PSA Group, in 2017. Before that, Vauxhall was owned by General Motors from 1925, although as a direct subsidiary of German automaker Opel.

It was founded by Alexander Wilson in 1857 as a pump and marine engine manufacturer, then purchased by Andrew Betts Brown in 1863 who began producing travelling cranes under the company, renaming it "Vauxhall Iron Works". The company began manufacturing cars in 1903, and changed its name back around this time. It was acquired by American automaker General Motors (GM) in 1925. Bedford Vehicles was established as a subsidiary of Vauxhall in 1930 to manufacture commercial vehicles.

Vauxhall was a luxury car marque until it was bought by General Motors, which thereafter built mid-market offerings. Since the Great Depression, Vauxhall has become increasingly mass market

Since 1980, Vauxhall vehicles have become largely identical to those of Opel, and most models are principally engineered in Rüsselsheim am Main, Germany. During the early 1980s, the Vauxhall marque was withdrawn from sale in all territories apart from the UK. Vauxhall still has one active commercial vehicle manufacturing facility in Ellesmere Port. In 2012, the Ellesmere Port plant employed around 1,880 staff and had a theoretical (three-shift) capacity around 187,000 units a year. Vauxhall formerly operated the IBC Vehicles plant in Luton, which closed in April 2025. Vauxhall-branded vehicles are also manufactured in other Stellantis factories across Europe.

== History ==
=== Independent (1857–1925) ===
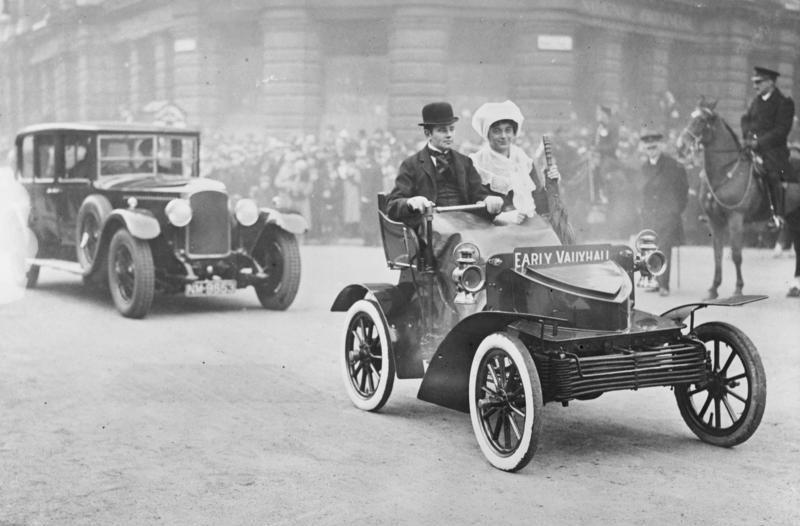
Oldest surviving Vauxhall, delivered in November 1903

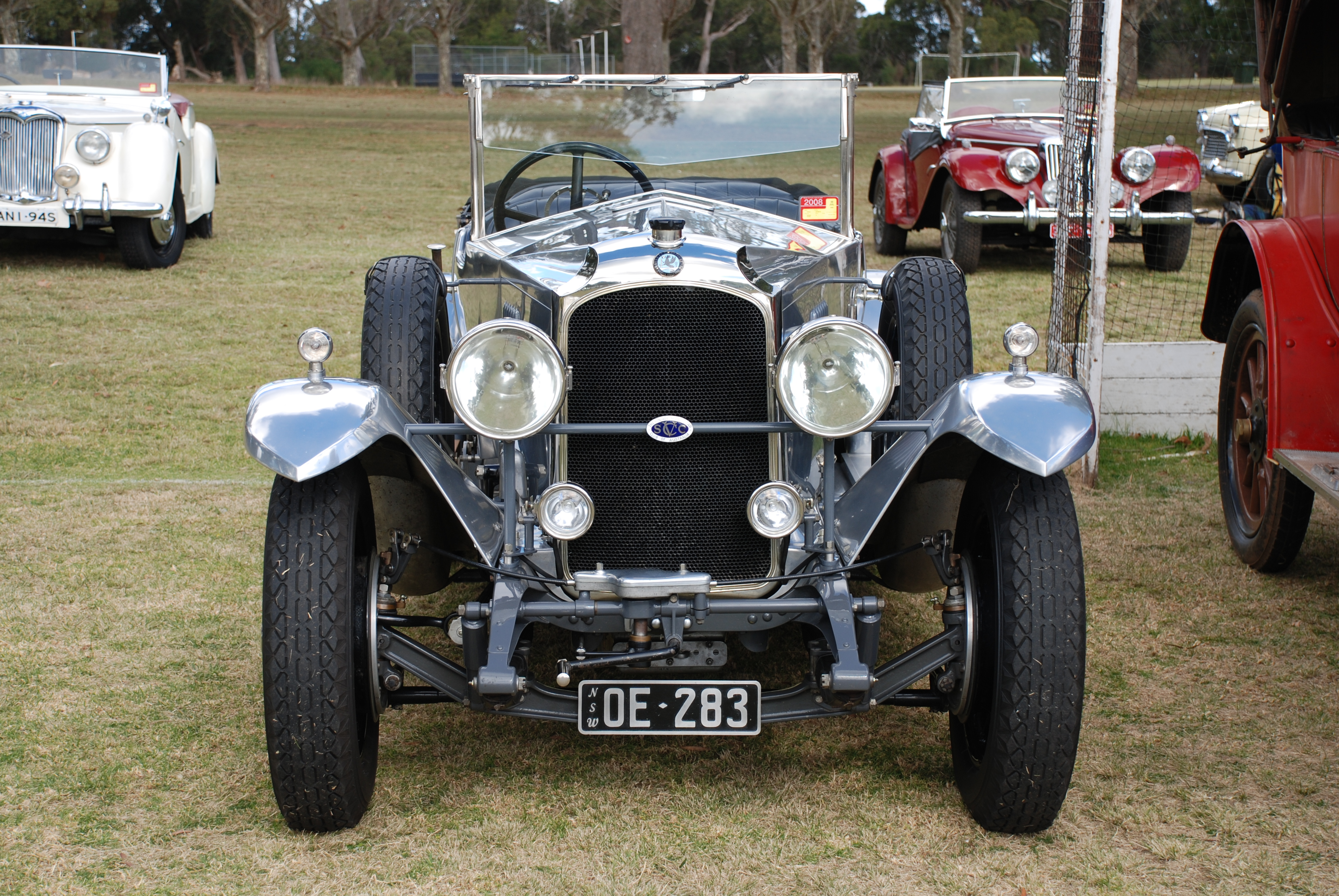
30–98 Velox

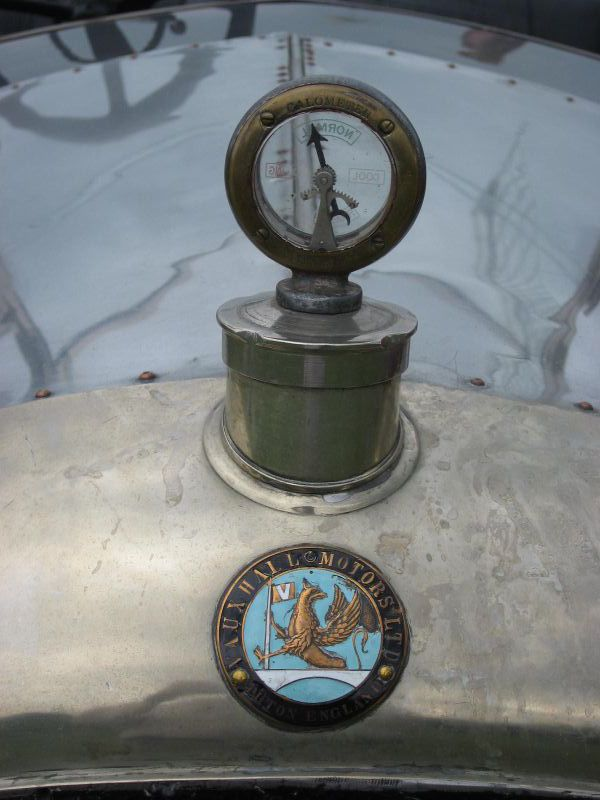
Vauxhall Griffin on a 1921 Vauxhall 25

Scottish marine engineer Alexander Wilson founded the company at 90–92 Wandsworth Road, Vauxhall, London (now the site of Nine Elms tube station), in 1857. It was founded as Alex Wilson and Company, and from 1857, the company built pumps and marine engines. In 1903 the company built its first car, a five-horsepower single-cylinder model steered using a tiller, with two forward gears and no reverse gear. About 70 were made in the first year, before the car was improved with wheel steering and a reverse gear in 1904. A single survivor could still be seen at the London Science Museum in 1968. A 1903 model was entered in the London-to-Brighton car run in 2018.

To expand, the company moved the majority of its production to Luton in 1905. The company continued to trade under the name Vauxhall Iron Works until 1907, when the modern name 'Vauxhall Motors' was adopted. The company was characterised by its sporting models, but after World War I, the company's designs were more austere.

Much of Vauxhall's success during the early years of Vauxhall Motors was attributable to Laurence Pomeroy. He joined Vauxhall in 1906 at the age of 22, as an assistant draughtsman. In the winter of 1907/8, the chief designer F. W. Hodges took a long holiday, and in his absence, the managing director Percy Kidner asked Pomeroy to design an engine for cars to be entered in the 1908 RAC and Scottish Reliability Trial, held in June that year. The cars were so successful that Pomeroy took over from Hodges.

Pomeroy's first design, the Y-Type Y1, had outstanding success at the 1908 RAC and Scottish 2000 Mile Reliability Trials—showing excellent hill-climbing ability with an aggregate of 37 seconds less time in the hill climbs than any other car in its class. With unparalleled speeds around the Brooklands circuit, the Vauxhall was so far ahead of all other cars of any class that the driver could relax, accomplishing the 200 miles (320 km) at an average speed of 46 mph (74 km/h), when the car was capable of 55 mph (89 km/h). The Y-Type went on to win class E of the trial.

The Y-Type was so successful that it was decided to put the car into production as the A09 car. This spawned the Vauxhall A-Type. Four distinct types of this were produced between 27 October 1908 and when mass production halted in 1914. One last A-Type was put together in 1920. Capable of up to 100 mph (160 km/h), the A-Type Vauxhall was one of the most acclaimed three-litre cars of its day.

Two cars were entered in the 1910 Prince Henry Trials, and although not outright winners, performed well, and replicas were made for sale officially as the C-type, but now known as the Prince Henry. During the First World War, Vauxhall made large numbers of the D-type, a Prince Henry chassis with derated engine, for use as staff cars for the British forces.

After the 1918 armistice, the D-type remained in production, along with the sporting E-type. Pomeroy left in 1919, moving to the United States, and was replaced by C.E. King. Although Vauxhall made good cars, expensive pedigree cars of the kind that had served the company well in the prosperous prewar years were no longer in demand; the company struggled to make a consistent profit and Vauxhall looked for a major strategic partner.

=== Production figures: 1903–1925 ===
Year	Production figures	Model
1903	43	5 HP
1904	76	5 HP; 12/14
1905	1	12/14
1906	15	12/14
1907	69	12/14
1908	94	12/14; A09; B09
1909	195	A09; B09
1910	243	A09; B09; B10; A11; B11
1911	265	A09; B09; A11; B11; C10
1912	302	A11; B11; C10; S; A12
1913	387	A12; E
1914		
1915		
1916		
1917		
1918		
1919	565	
1920	689	
1921	479	
1922	637	
1923	1462	
1924	1366	
1925	1388	

=== General Motors (1925–2017) ===
==== 1925–1939 ====
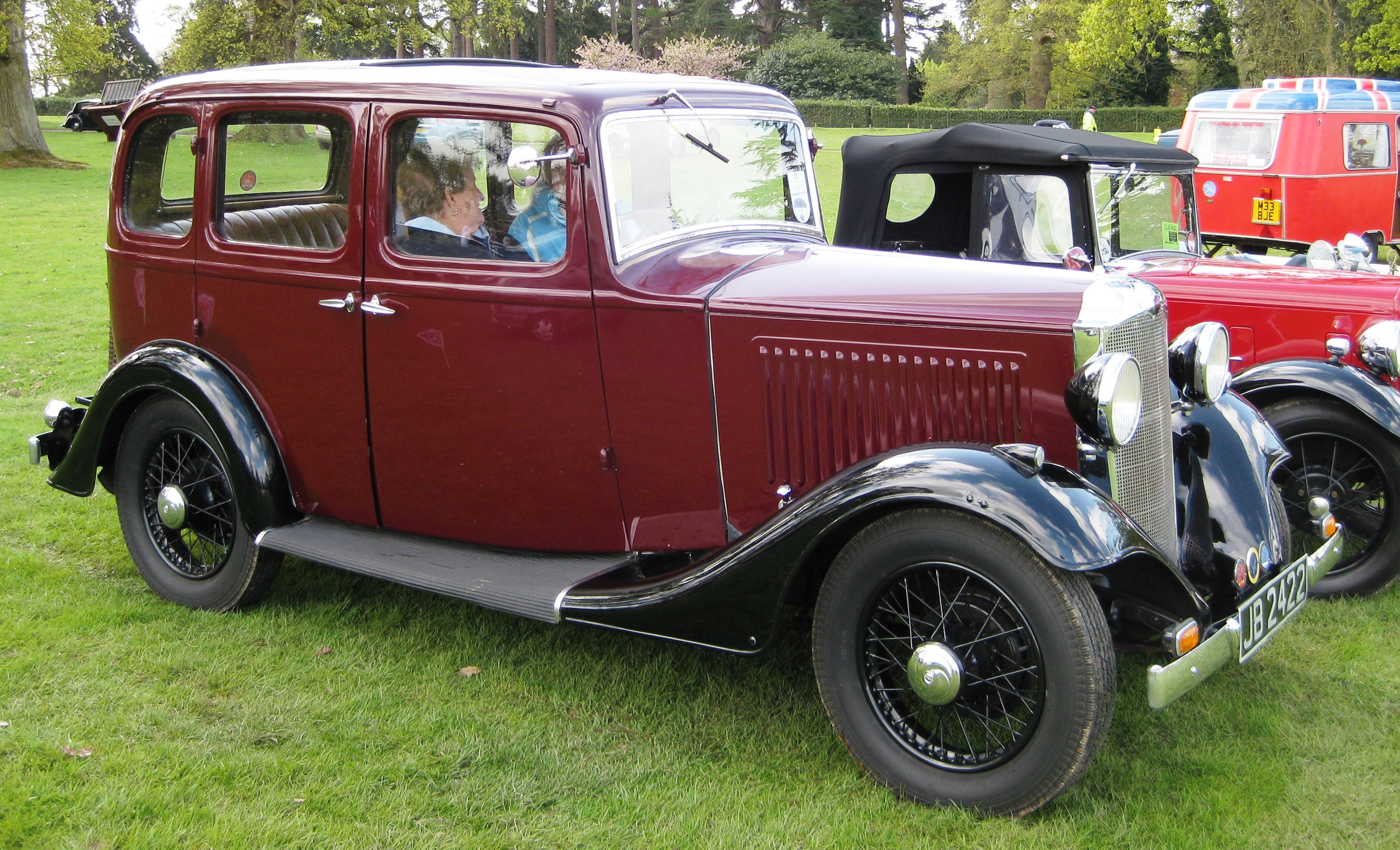
1933 Vauxhall Light Six. This was the first Vauxhall to sell in numbers comparable to rivals from the largest British car makers of the day.

On 16 November 1925, Vauxhall was acquired by General Motors for US$2.5 million. At the time, the purchase was not popular among senior U.S. GM executives. Vauxhall was only making seventeen cars per week and was in a financial mess. The company's image and target market were gently but firmly changed over the next five and more years, marked particularly by the introduction in late 1930 of the low-cost two-litre Vauxhall Cadet and the next year the first Bedford truck, which was Chevrolet based. Vauxhall's chief engineer since 1920, Charles Evelyn King, retired as engineering director in 1950. The company's future chief engineer, Harold Drew, left Luton for a spell, working as a draughtsman with GM's Lansing-based Oldsmobile division. As the first significant post-acquisition passenger car, the Cadet, initially retailing at £280, is generally regarded as demonstrating Vauxhall's newly acquired interest and expertise in controlling production costs, but it was also the first British car to feature a synchromesh gearbox.

General Motors continued to reposition Vauxhall towards the middle of the British car market. They aimed to produce higher volumes of more conventional cars that, using GM's large engineering, design and production resources, would offer modern technology and high levels of equipment at a reasonable price, with competitors being the likes of Wolseley and Humber. The Cadet had been the first step in this process, which gathered pace in June 1933 with the launch of the AS-type Light Six. With an all-steel body and a refined and modern overhead valve inline-six engine, the Light Six was produced in 12- and 14-'tax horsepower' variants. Modernisation and expansion of the Luton factory meant that the Light Six was sold for £195 for the standard four-door saloon, which was significantly less than many of its older rivals with four-cylinder engines and fewer interior appointments, and Vauxhall made the unusual decision to offer both 12 and 14 models for the same price. Two-door saloon, coupe, tourer and cabriolet bodies were also available for extra cost, plus a range of other body designs from coachbuilders. The Light Six was an immediate sale success, surpassing all previous Vauxhall products by a large margin with 26,000 examples being sold in just over 12 months and with the Luton factory moving onto 24-hour shift work to meet demand. Vauxhall had suddenly become a significant player in the British car market.

After 15 months on sale the AS-type Light Six was replaced by the D-type Light Six. This was fundamentally the same as the outgoing model with minor styling and interior updates, but with one major engineering change—namely the addition of Dubonnet suspension to the front, making the new Light Six the first mass-production British saloon car with independent front suspension. The Dubonnet system was a GM patent, also used on Chevrolet and Pontiac models in the US and on Opel cars in Europe. The D-type Light Six was priced at between £205 and £245 for the standard saloon depending on the exact specification, which was still a lower-than-average price for a car of the new Light Six's size, power, equipment and technical specification and this was another successful model for Vauxhall.

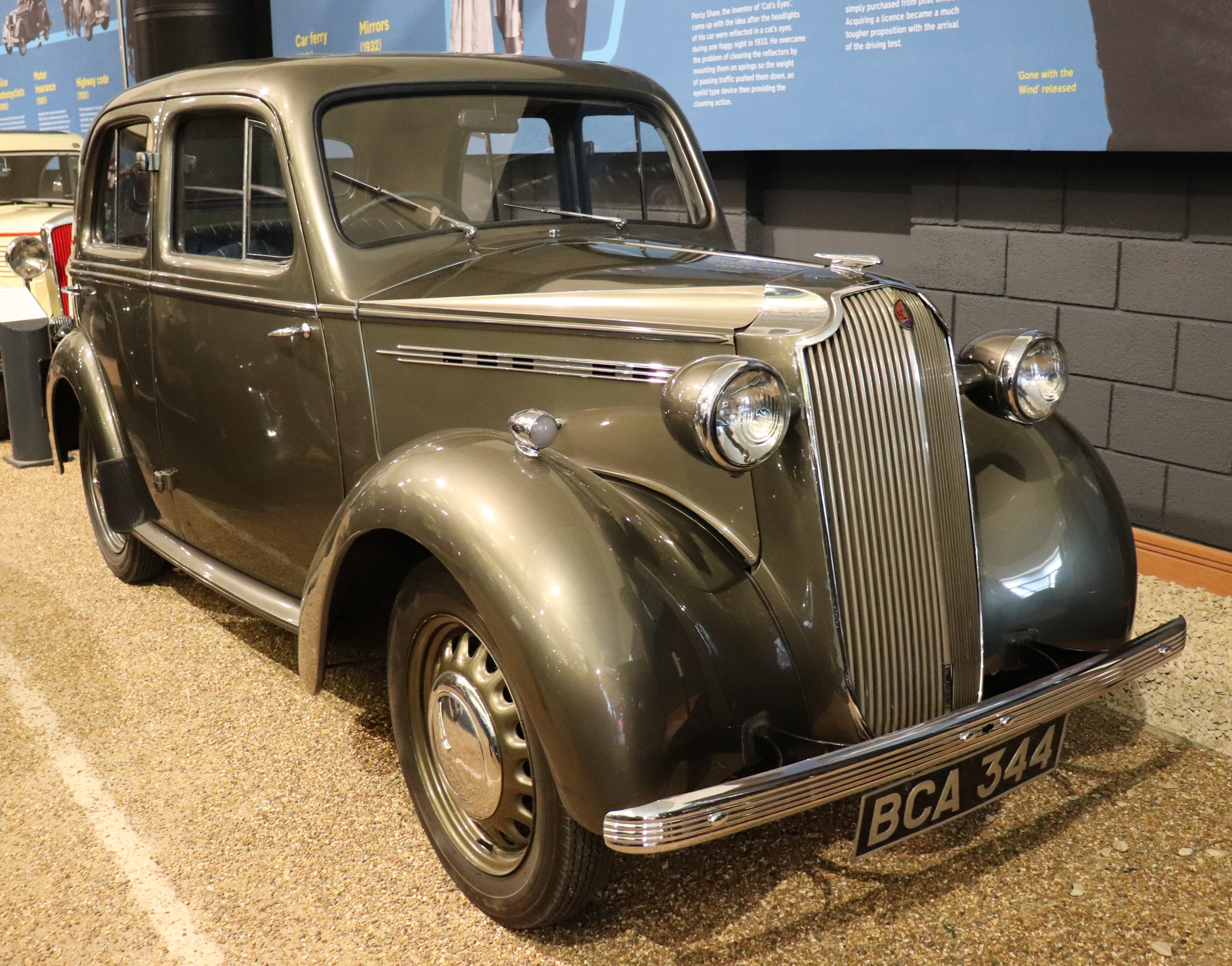
The 10-4 of 1937 was the first mass-production British unibody saloon car and was called "The £1 Million Motor Car" after its costly and extensive development programme.

The overall strategy for Vauxhall continued to be to make smaller models with the latest engineering developments. Vauxhall and GM management planned a completely new three-model car range which would use cutting-edge unibody construction instead of the traditional body-on-frame design. The first mass-production unibody car, the Citroën Traction Avant began production in 1934, the same year that design work on the new Vauxhall range began. As well as designing an entirely new car body, this change required major expansion, renewal and investment in the Luton factory as well as a significant expansion of Vauxhall's engineering and design staff. The first of the new models was released in September 1937. This was the H-type 10-4 (the model number referring to its 10 tax-horsepower, four-cylinder engine). This was the first truly small Vauxhall in many years. As well as its advanced unibody structure—a first for a British saloon car—the 10-4 also featured an overhead valve engine, fully hydraulic brakes and Dubonnet front suspension. Other features included a full-synchromesh gearbox, mechanical windscreen wipers and a 'six-stage' carburetor. Priced at £168–182, the 10-4 was only slightly more expensive than old-fashioned equivalents from Austin and Morris and cost around £30 more than the cheapest 10-horsepower class car on sale, the Ford 7W. The model was promoted as "The £1 Million Motor Car", reflecting the supposed investment in its design and production and was noted for its excellent fuel economy of over 40mpg when touring due to its efficient modern engine and lightweight body. The 10-4 was considered to be the finest small car in the world at the time of its launch and initial demand greatly exceeded production capacity. Just six months after the 10-4's launch, the 10,000th example left Luton—a production record for the Vauxhall at the time. The H-type 10-4 was only the first and smallest in the proposed trio of similarly advanced unibody cars. The I-type 12-4 (essentially the same as the 10-4 but with a longer wheelbase and an enlarged engine) was introduced in September 1938 and the J-type 14-6, replacing the old Light Six, was introduced the following month but sales did not begin until early 1939. This advanced three-model range was very well received by critics and buyers and placed Vauxhall in the vanguard of automotive engineering for the mass market in Britain. However, the outbreak of the Second World War in 1939 greatly restricted the sales of all new cars just as the new Vauxhall range was entering the market and production was reaching full flow. Car production was ceased entirely in May 1940, by which time over 50,000 10-4s, 10,000 12-4s and 15,000 14-6s had been built.

=== Production figures (1926–1950) ===
Year	Production figures	Cars	Trucks	Model	Truck Model
1926	1516	1516			
1927	1654	1654		Vauxhall 20-60	
1928	2589	2589		Vauxhall 20-60	
1929	1278	1278		Vauxhall 20-60	
1930	8930	1172	7758 Chevrolet	Vauxhall 20-60	
1931	15152	3927	11225		WHG; WLG
1932	16918	3679	13239		WS; VY; VX
1933	27636	11106	16530	Vauxhall Light Six	WT; ASY; ASX
1934	40455	11816	21639	Vauxhall Light Six—	ASX BX(C)
1935	48671	26240	22431	Vauxhall Light Six	ASX; BX(C)
1936	50703	21319	29384	Vauxhall Light Six	ASX; BX(C)
1937	59744	28076	31668	Vauxhall Light Six Vauxhall 10-4	
1938	60111	35415	24696	Vauxhall Light Six Vauxhall 10-4	HC
1939			from 1939 to 1946		Bedford M series Bedford MW Bedford OY
1940		~ 100	~ 250000 trucks		Bedford MW Bedford OY
1941			& 5640 Churchill tanks		Bedford MW Bedford OY
1942					Bedford MW Bedford OY
1943					Bedford MW Bedford OY
1944					Bedford MW Bedford OY
1945					Bedford MW Bedford OY
1946	53586	29772	33864		Bedford M series Bedford OY
1947	61453	30376	31077		Bedford M series Bedford OY
1948	74576	39566	35010		Bedford M series Bedford OY
1949	84167	45366	38801		Bedford M series Bedford OY
1950	87454	47025	40429		Bedford M series Bedford S type Bedford OY
1954			58292		
1955			64773		
1968	~ 245000				

==== 1940s ====
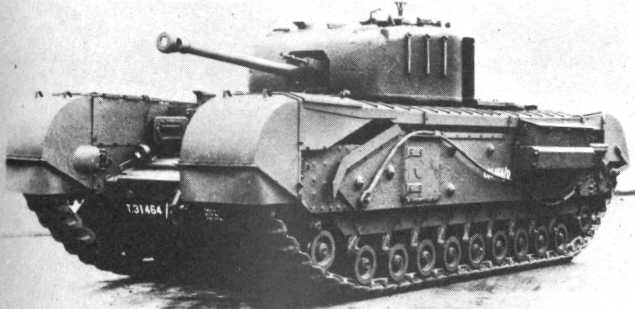
A Mk IV Churchill tank (75 mm), of which 7,368 were manufactured by Vauxhall between 1941 and 1945

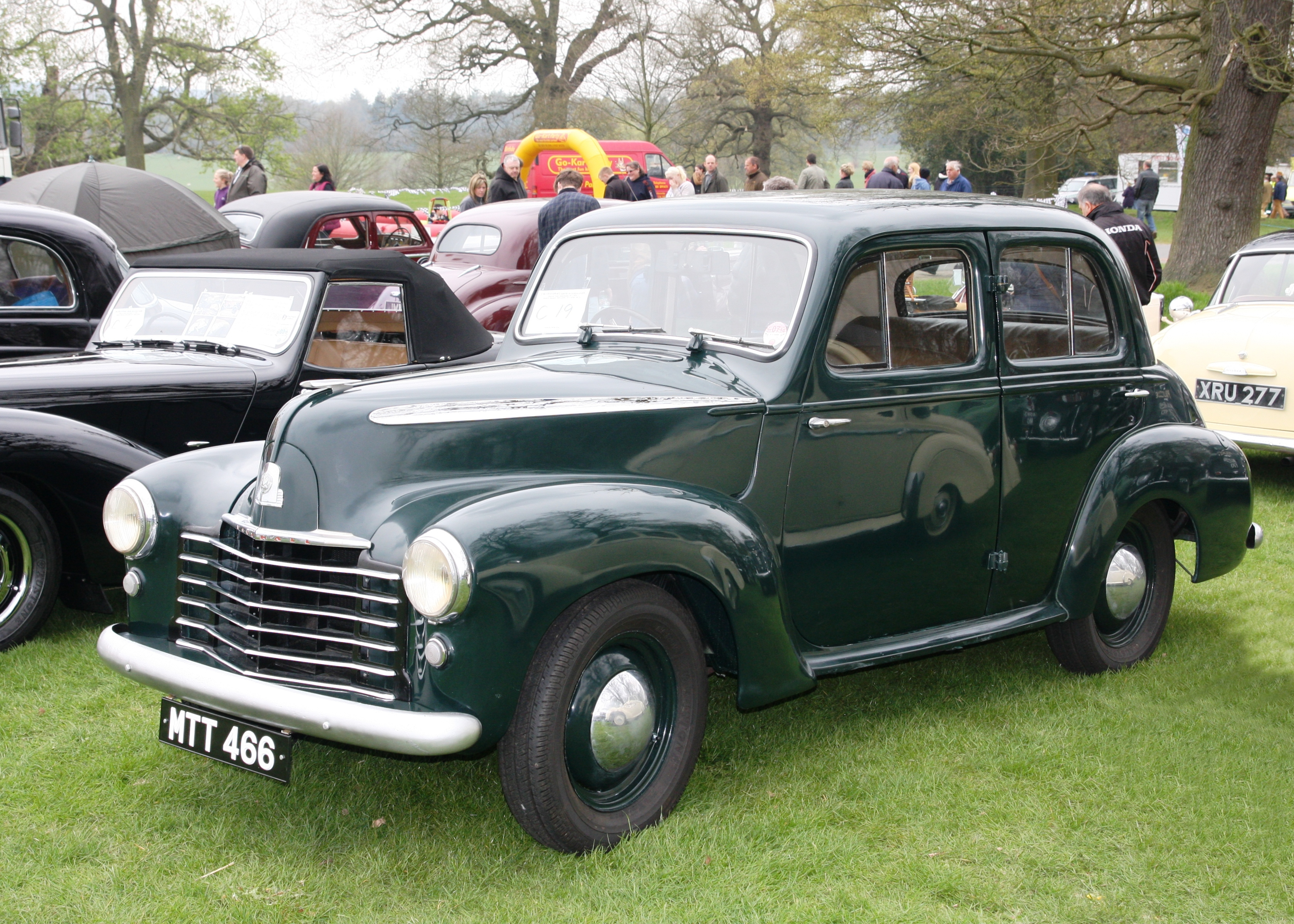
The L-Type Wyvern was the first new post-war Vauxhall and was essentially a reskin of the pre-war 10–4.

During the Second World War, car production at Luton was suspended to allow Vauxhall to work on the new Churchill tank. Despite a bombing raid in August 1940, in which 39 employees were killed, it was taken from specification to production in less than a year, and assembled there (as well as at other sites). More than 5,600 Churchill tanks were built. Luton also produced around 250,000 lorries for the war effort, alongside the new Bedford Dunstable plant, which was opened in 1942, with Bedford designs being common in British use. As a morale booster for the company employees, on 23, 24 and 25 February 1944, Adelaide Hall appeared in concert at the factory in Luton, where she entertained the employees during their lunch break. In all, she performed in front of more than 10,000 workers; this was the first time that Vauxhall had contracted a star to perform at their factory for three consecutive days.

Vauxhall was one of the first English car makers to switch from wartime to civilian production, mostly due to the ease with which Bedford trucks in production for military use could be redirected to the civilian market. The first post-war civilian trucks were made a few days before VJ Day in August 1945, with Vauxhall car production resuming in September. These initial models were essentially unchanged from the three-model range (H-, I-, and J-type unibody designs) that had been launched just before the outbreak of war in 1939. However, they were now renamed simply as the Vauxhall Ten, Twelve and Fourteen, respectively, were each available in a single body and specification (four-door saloons to what had been the Deluxe trim level) to ease production and had minor internal and external trim differences to account for shortages or extra costs of various materials.

Government regulations of the time meant that 75% of production had to be sent for export, so very few of these revived models reached buyers in the United Kingdom. Further rationalisation occurred in 1946 when the Twelve ceased to be a distinct model and now shared the body of the Ten but with the larger-capacity engine. These models were superseded by 'new' cars in 1948. GM management had dictated that Luton should only utilise a single body design in order to maximise productivity and reduce supply costs. The British government had also revoked the RAC taxable horsepower system and replaced it with a flat charge per vehicle regardless of engine size. This meant that there was no longer an imperative to offer similar models with different engine capacities to fit in the different bands of the old tax system. Therefore, the new 1948 L-Type Vauxhalls consisted of just a pair of models, both using the body structure, floorpan and many running gear parts of the H-type/Ten model. However, Vauxhall's director of styling, David Jones, managed to fit brand new exterior panels to the front, rear and rear-quarters of the old body centre-section to give the L-type a modern look which shared its basic shape and features with GM's Chevrolet Fleetline of the same year, albeit at a much smaller scale.

The new models were the Wyvern (using the four-cylinder engine previously used in the Twelve) and the Velox using a new wide-bore development of the six-cylinder engine from the Fourteen. Otherwise, the L-Types reused the three-speed transmission (albeit with a switch to a column gear change, hydraulic brakes and Dubonnet suspension of the pre-war models essentially unchanged. Those predecessors had been advanced for their time so the Wyvern and Velox were still competitive despite being considered small and cramped alongside the likes of the Morris Minor or the A40 Devon of Austin. The Velox especially, with its smooth and powerful engine in a relatively small car, offered strong performance and good reliability to compete against the V8-powered Ford Pilot.

==== 1950s ====
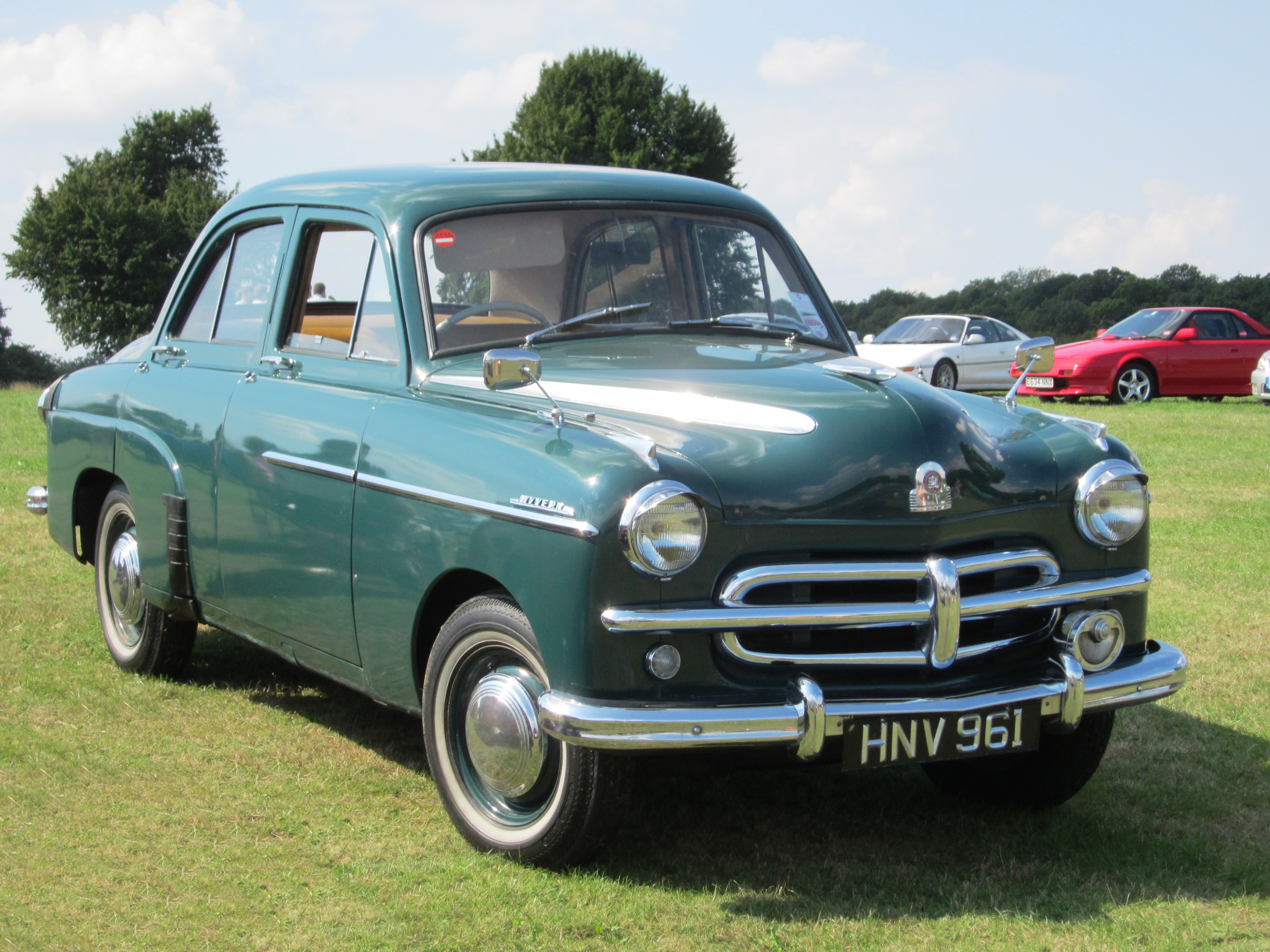
The E-Type Vauxhalls (Wyvern pictured) used a brand-new body and were much larger and more refined than their predecessors.

The L-Types were replaced by a truly new model, the E-Types, in 1951 with the new cars having been in development since 1948. GM was still restricting Vauxhall to a one-body policy and the range still consisted of two models differentiated mostly by their engines—the four-cylinder EIX Wyvern and the six-cylinder EIP Velox. While they were designed at Luton they drew a lot of influence from styling developments made in Detroit, especially the revised 1951-model-year Chevrolets. The E-Types continued the use of unibody construction, but of a brand new and much larger design with full-width 'pontoon' styling. They offered significantly more cabin and luggage space and a great deal of effort was put into both the styling of the interior and the reduction of vibration and noise. The complicated Dubonnet suspension system was replaced by more conventional design using coil springs and twin wishbones with telescopic dampers, while the rear axle retained leaf springs but also with the addition of telescopic dampers. The transmission and steering remained little-changed from the existing design.

Vauxhall planned and developed a new range of short-stroke overhead-valve engines for the E-Types but financial and production constraints meant that the first new Wyverns and Veloxes were launched with the same engines as the outgoing L-Type. In the bigger, heavier E-Type models these gave very poor performance, especially the Wyvern with an engine all-but unchanged since 1937. The new engines, both slightly larger than the existing design, were fitted to both models during 1952 and brought performance up to a competitive level. In terms of price and production the E-Type Vauxhalls were now full contenders in the mid-size car market in Britain, alongside the likes of the Ford Consul/Zephyr and especially the increasingly old-fashioned Hillman Minx. By 1953, Vauxhall was building 110,000 E-Type models at Luton per year, with around half of production going to export—mostly to the Commonwealth markets which still maintained preferential tariffs for British-made products.

For 1955, the E-Type Vauxhalls received a facelift with new frontal and interior styling and minor mechanical refinements. Most importantly, Vauxhall returned to offering three car models (albeit all still sharing a single body design) with the addition of the Cresta, which was a more luxuriously styled and appointed version of the Velox. Following GM practice from America, from this point Vauxhall began offering annual minor updates, improvements and styling changes to its cars to both keep up with competitors and to tempt existing owners to replace their car.

Since the restarting of car production in 1945 the limiting factor for Vauxhall sales had been production, sometimes leading to lengthy waiting lists for customers. While the Luton factory had been expanded and modernised in the early 1950s, the main restriction was the lack of capacity for building the unitary bodyshells. Expansion of the body shop would require large investment that GM was reluctant to release and this was the main reason for Vauxhall relying on a single body design across three distinct models.

In 1954, GM management sanctioned a switch to a two-body line-up at Vauxhall with concurrent investment to expand both the body shop and production lines at Luton. The new model would replace the four-cylinder Wyvern with a smaller car using the same engine, bringing Vauxhall into line with the established norm for cars in the 1.5-litre class—the E-Type Wyvern was a significantly larger car than its direct competitors. The new car would be launched for 1957 alongside new Velox/Cresta models which could, correspondingly, be slightly enlarged since their body no longer had to be shared with a model in the class below.

The small model, named the F-Type Victor was announced first in February 1957. Although its engineering followed familiar Vauxhall lines—a unitary structure, independent front suspension with coil springs, a leaf-sprung live rear axle and a 1.5-litre four-cylinder overhead valve engine with a three-speed manual transmission with column-mounted change—it was, by necessity, virtually all brand new. The drivetrain was largely lifted from the outgoing E-Type Wyvern, but the engine received a higher compression ratio and updated carburation to account for the new widespread availability of high-octane fuel and so made more power. Stylistically the Victor followed the familiar Vauxhall trend of following American styling trends, although the Victor took this to a new level by closely resembling the famous 1955 Chevrolet Bel Air, complete with tailfins, prominent 'flutes' on the bonnet (a modern evocation of a familiar Vauxhall styling cue dating back to the 1920s), wrap-around front and rear screens, large chromed bumpers and an exhaust tailpipe integrated into one of the rear overriders. A year after launch the Victor would also provide the basis for Vauxhall's first factory-built estate car.

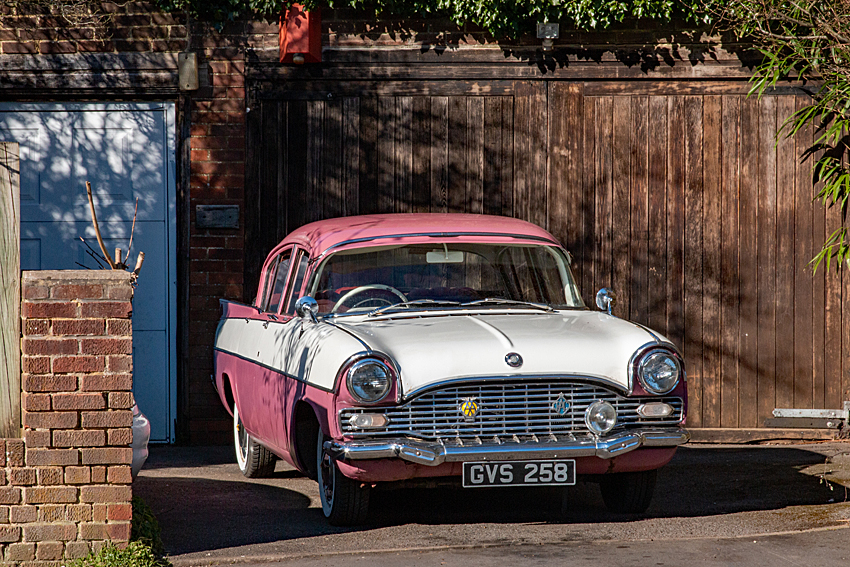
1961 Vauxhall Cresta

The new P-Type Velox/Cresta models were announced in October 1957. Like the Victor these essentially featured updated versions of the drivetrain (and running gear) from the E-Type models in a new, larger and much more flamboyantly styled body. American styling cues were again much in evidence, this time being heavily influenced by a 1954 Cadillac concept car called the Park Avenue.

Both the new Vauxhall models continued the success of their predecessors. The Victor achieved new sales records for Vauxhall and in the late 1950s was Britain's most exported car, being sold in most right-hand drive car markets such as Australia, New Zealand, South Africa, India, Pakistan, Thailand and Singapore. The model was also sold in left-hand drive form by General Motors in Canada (under the specially created Envoy name and under the original Vauxhall Victor name through Pontiac dealerships in the USA. Nearly 400,000 F-Type Victors were built at Luton between the start of 1957 and the end of production in mid-1961. With the Victor taking the place of many previous Wyvern sales, the P-Type models did not sell in the same quantities as the entire E-Type range had, but over 180,000 were built between October 1957 and July 1962 with over 100,000 of those cars being exported.

Both the Victor and the Velox/Cresta received criticism for their overtly American styling, which many reviewers saw as gaudy against more conservative British tastes. Both models had their styling revised in 1959 to remove some of the more extreme styling details. Both models also quickly developed a reputation for rapid and severe structural corrosion. The F-Type Victor was especially badly affected by this issue, caused by a combination of thin-gauge steel to minimise weight, numerous moisture traps in its body design (for instance the hidden exhaust design encouraged corrosive exhaust gases and condensation to collect in the rear wing corners), the fitting of a plasticised underseal treatment to the floorpan which served to trap moisture and dirt once it became chipped or cracked and the fact that the Victor was built in quantities and rates that the Luton plant had not previously dealt with.

==== 1960s ====
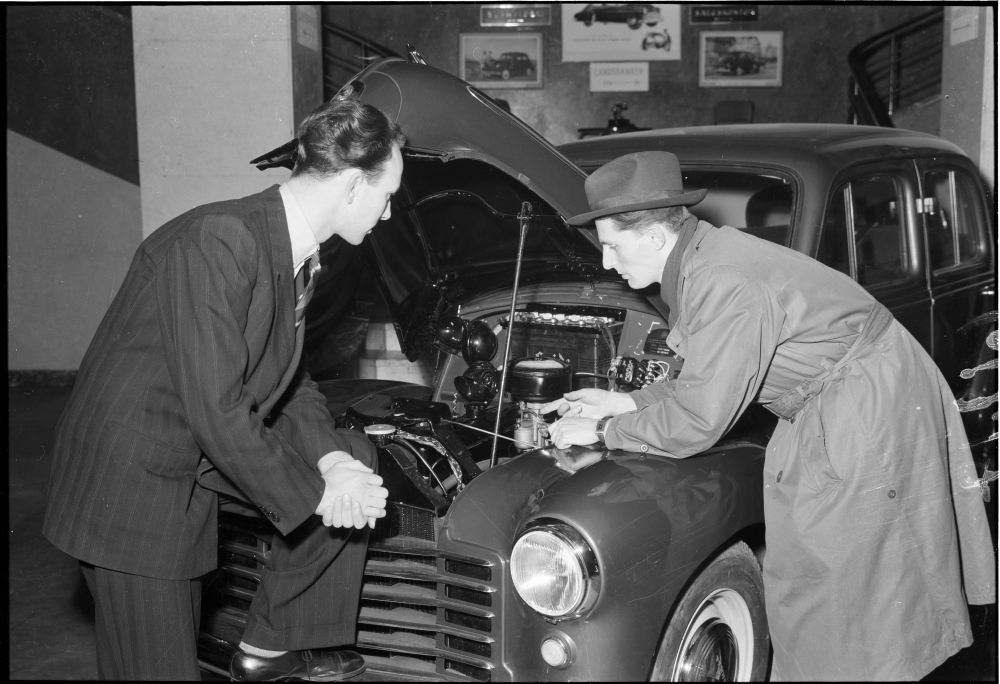
A buyer and seller looking under the bonnet of a Vauxhall at a dealership in Denmark in the 1950s

A manufacturing plant at Ellesmere Port, Cheshire, was opened in 1962, initially making components to supply to the production lines in Luton, before passenger-car production began there in 1964.

In 1963, production of the Vauxhall Viva small family car commenced, with the new car being aimed at the like of the Ford Anglia. The German version of the car was sold as the Opel Kadett. The locally assembled Vauxhall Viva was launched in Australia in May 1964. In 1966, Vauxhall's Slant Four engine went into production—the first production overhead camshaft inline-four to use a rubber timing belt. Also, the FD Victor was launched at the Earls Court Motor Show, considered by many to be one of Vauxhall's finest all-British styling efforts.

During the 1960s, Vauxhall acquired a reputation for making rust-prone models. The corrosion protection built into models was tightened up significantly, but the reputation dogged the company until at least the early 1980s.

In 1967, Vauxhall became a Royal Warrant Holder: Motor Vehicle Manufacturers to HM The Queen—the Royal Mews. The warrant of HRH The Prince of Wales was added in 1994.

By the late 1960s, the company was achieving five-figure sales on its most popular models, including the entry-level Viva and the larger Victor.

==== 1970s ====
In 1970, the HC Viva was launched, which went on to become Vauxhall's best-selling car of the decade, featuring among the 10 best-selling cars in Britain each year until after 1976, with production not finishing until 1979, when the Viva nameplate was finally discontinued after 16 years and three generations. In 1973, the Vauxhall Firenza "Droopsnoot" coupe was unveiled at the Earls Court Motor Show, introducing the public to Vauxhall's new aerodynamic look for all of its subsequent 1970s models.

By 1973, the Victor was losing sales in a market that was becoming increasingly dominated by the Ford Cortina. This was not enough to keep Vauxhall from being well behind market leaders like Ford in sales, and most of its range was struggling even to keep pace with Chrysler UK (formerly the Rootes Group).

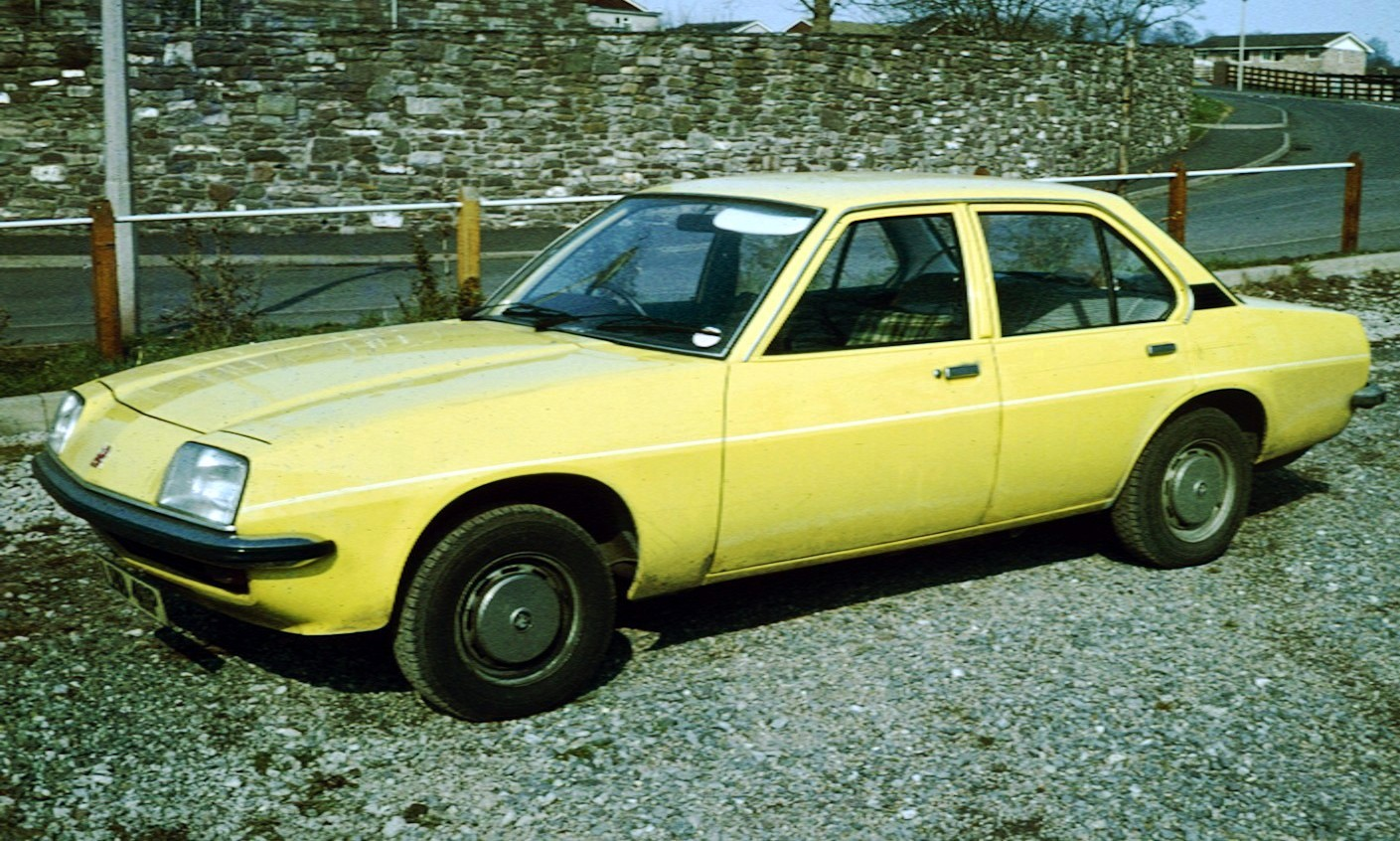
The Cavalier Mark I, in production from 1975 to 1981

Vauxhall's sales began to increase from 1975, with the launch of two important new models, the Chevette, a small three-door hatchback that was the first car of its kind to be built in Britain, and the Cavalier, a four-door saloon designed to compete head-to-head with the all-conquering Ford Cortina. A two-door coupe and three-door "sport hatch" had joined the Cavalier range by 1978, but there never was an estate version. The Cavalier helped Vauxhall regain lost ground in this crucial sector of the market, while the Chevette proved to be hugely popular in the growing supermini sector, as more buyers turned to smaller cars following the oil crisis of 1973.

The Chevette range later evolved into a three-door estate, as well as saloons with two or four doors. Both models were based on models produced by Opel, GM's German subsidiary, the Chevette being based on the Opel Kadett, but with a distinct front end. Along with the Chevrolet Chevette in the US and Canada, the Chevette and Kadett were built on GM's T-Car platform. Similarly, the Cavalier was based on the Opel Ascona, but featured the front end of the Manta, as did the Chevrolet Chevair in South Africa.

This marked the end of a long and gradual process by GM to consolidate its two European subsidiaries with preference for the larger, and in terms of both absolute sales and market share, more successful Opel, which sold 925,000 vehicles to Vauxhall's 143,600. Since the early 1960s, Vauxhalls, whilst being designed and built in the United Kingdom, increasingly shared their general specification, engineering features, and styling with Opel counterparts (the Viva with the Kadett and the Victor with the Rekord, for instance) even if the two cars were distinct, with few to any interchangeable parts.

From the late 1960s and into the early 1970s, increasing economic turmoil in the UK, declining build quality, and increasing strike action throughout British industry (and in stark contrast, the Wirtschaftswunder or economic miracle of West Germany during the same period), plus the entry of the UK into the European Economic Community in 1973, made maintaining two parallel model lines serving similar markets increasingly undesirable.

The FE Series Victor, launched in 1972, would be the last all-British Vauxhall. Following the introduction of the Chevette and Cavalier, virtually all future Vauxhalls would be lightly restyled Opels, under what was described by the company's management as "Opelisation". The exceptions would be based on models from elsewhere in the GM organisation. However, Vauxhall retained its two British factories at Luton and Ellesmere Port, with most cars wearing the Vauxhall badge still being built in the UK.

The introduction of the Opel-based Vauxhalls marked a significant improvement in both the design and build quality of Vauxhall cars, which were now considered strong rivals to their Ford competitors. By the end of the 1970s, Vauxhall had boosted its market share substantially, and was fast closing in on Ford and British Leyland.

In 1978, Vauxhall strengthened its position in the executive car market with the launch of its all-new Carlton saloon and estate, which were facelifted versions of the German-built Opel Rekord. A year later, a more upmarket saloon model, the Senator, was launched under the Opel brand, and finally became available as a Vauxhall from 1983.

By 1979, Vauxhall had increased its market share substantially; it was still some way behind Ford and British Leyland, but had overtaken Talbot (the Peugeot-owned successor to Rootes and Chrysler UK). By this time, GM had decided to withdraw the Vauxhall marque from most other European markets in favour of Opel. This saw an end to the export of Vauxhall models, as exports to Continental Europe had fallen from 32,000 units in 1970 to 12,900 units in 1978.

==== 1980s ====
By 1981, Vauxhall exports were largely confined to Chevettes sold in Germany. While Opel-built cars were exported to the UK and badged as Vauxhalls, no Vauxhall-built cars were exported badged as Opels. It would not be until 1990 that Vauxhall would resume left hand drive production for export.

Similarly, the use of Opel brand on the UK market would be confined to sporting models, and with the success and wide range choice of the new Vauxhall products of the early 1980s, the Manta was the only Opel-badged car being imported to the UK by the end of 1984. When the Manta was finally discontinued in 1988, Opel models were no longer officially imported to the UK. Its successor, the Calibra, was badged as a Vauxhall on the UK market.

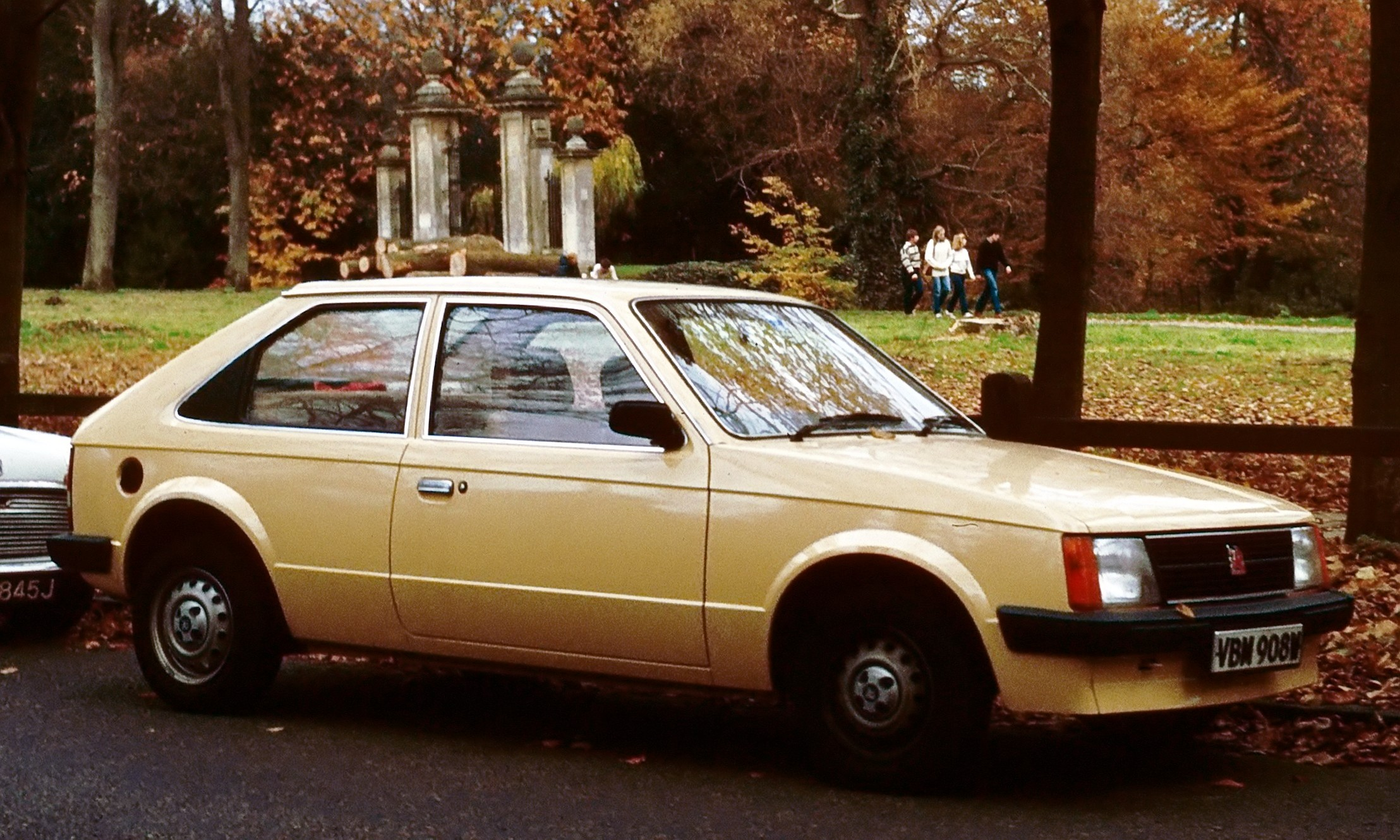
The Vauxhall Astra Mk I, in production from 1979 to 1984

Early in 1980, Vauxhall moved into the modern family hatchback market with its Astra range that replaced the aging Viva, and quickly became popular with buyers. The Astra was a rebadged version of the first front-wheel drive Opel Kadett, which had been launched in 1979, and was sold alongside the Astra for several years. Initially imported from Opel's plant in Bochum, it was later produced at the Vauxhall plant in Ellesmere Port.

In 1981, the company released the Mk2 Cavalier, the first Vauxhall of this size to offer front-wheel drive and a hatchback bodystyle. Built at the Luton plant, it really boosted Vauxhall's fortunes, with the Cavalier's sales for 1982 almost trebling its total for 1981, and peaking at more than 130,000 by 1984. During that time, sales of the Vauxhall marque more than doubled. This was complemented in 1983 with an estate, based on the Camira produced in Australia by Holden, with the tailgates for the Vauxhall version being built there and shipped to Luton. It was Britain's second-best selling car in 1984 and 1985, and spent most of its production life vying with the Ford Sierra for top place in the large family car market. The Cavalier was relaunched in 1988, an all-new format that won praise for its sleek looks and much-improved resistance to rust.

April 1983 had the launch of the Nova supermini, a rebadged version of the Spanish-built Opel Corsa. The new entry-level model in the Vauxhall range, it was available as a hatchback or a saloon and was solely built at the Zaragoza plant in Spain. This completed Vauxhall's regeneration, and by the end of the 1980s, it had overtaken Austin as Britain's second-most popular carmaker. The arrival of the Nova also spelled the end of the Chevette in 1984 after nearly a decade in production.

The Astra further strengthened its position in the market with an all-new model in the autumn of 1984, featuring an aerodynamic design reminiscent of Ford's larger Sierra.

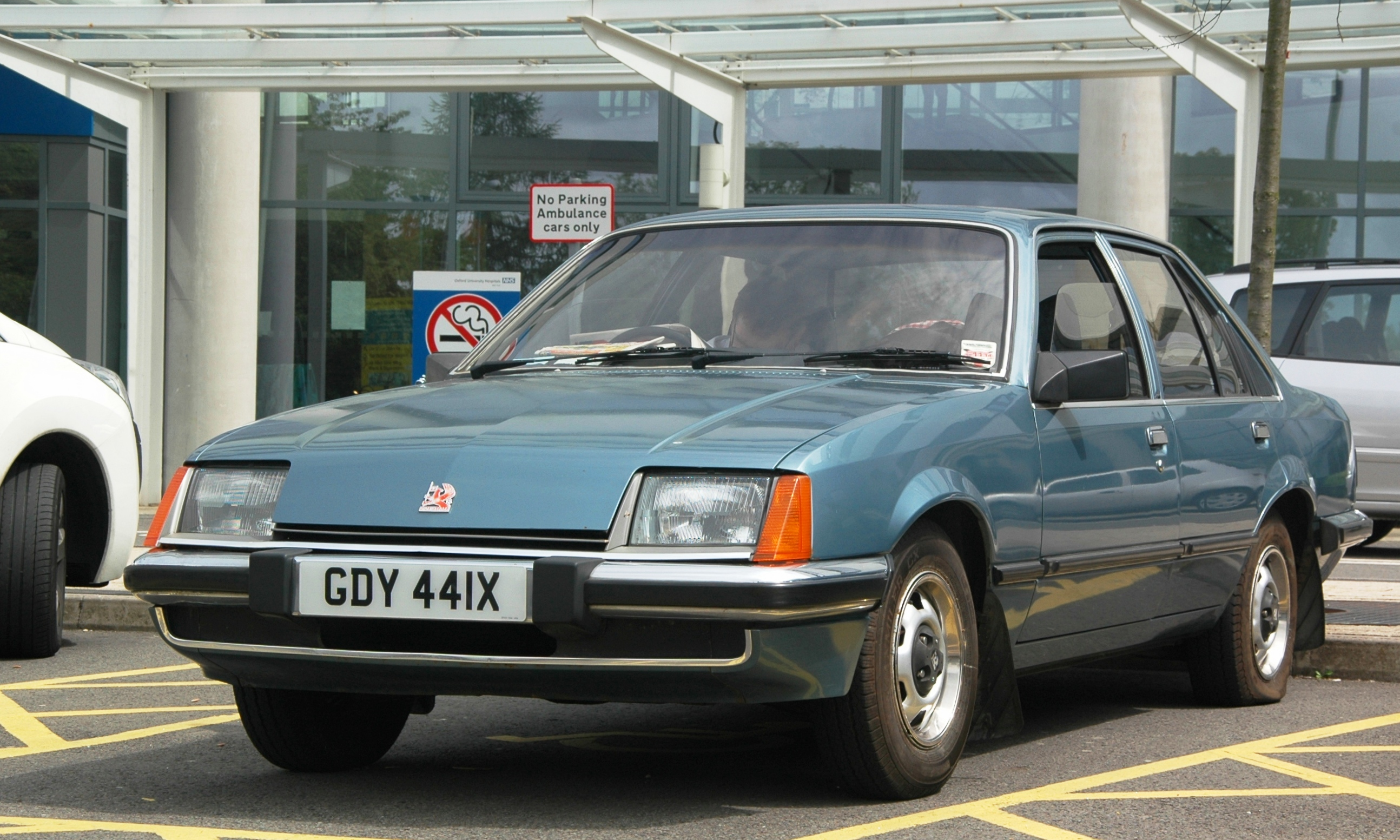
The Vauxhall Carlton Mark I

In 1984, the aerodynamically styled Vauxhall Astra Mk2 built at the Ellesmere Port Plant became the first Vauxhall car to be elected European Car of the Year. From the spring of 1985, the Vauxhall Nova was also available as a four-door saloon and five-door hatchback.

In January 1986, Vauxhall launched the Belmont, a saloon version of the Astra, which offered more interior space and was almost as big as a Cavalier. However, this car failed to reach Vauxhall's expectations in terms of sales, and from 1989 was rebadged the Astra Belmont.

Vauxhall won another "European Car of the Year" award with its all-new Vauxhall Carlton, a rebadged Opel-built vehicle and badged Opel Omega in the rest of Europe, sealing the award for 1987. A year after the launch of the MK2 Carlton, Vauxhall revitalised its flagship Senator to create a new-generation luxury saloon.

The Luton-built Cavalier (Mk3) (sold as the Opel Vectra in Ireland and mainland Europe) entered its third generation in 1988 with an all-new sleek design that further enhanced its popularity. The Calibra coupé followed in 1989, which was officially the most aerodynamic production car in the world on its launch. Falling between the Cavalier and Senator was the Opel-built Carlton (Opel Rekord and later Opel Omega elsewhere)—relaunched in 1986, and was voted 1987 European Car of the Year, a large four-door family saloon. The two sports versions of the Carlton were the 3000 GSi and the Lotus Carlton, the latter being aimed at family-minded executives, and at 175 miles per hour (282 km/h), considered the fastest four-door production car at the time. The latest generation of Vauxhall models dispelled the image of rusting cars that had for so long put potential buyers off the Vauxhall brand.

==== 1990s ====
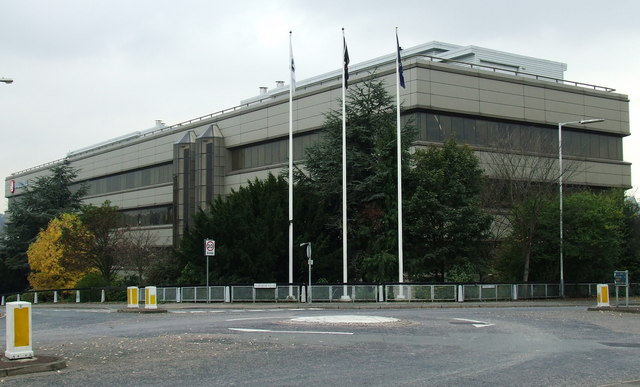
Griffin House became the Vauxhall headquarters building in 1991. It had previously been the design and testing building.

By 1990, Vauxhall was preparing to launch the MK3 Astra, and its first 4X4 off-road vehicle, while a replacement for the Nova was also in development.

In 1991, Vauxhall's corporate headquarters were moved to Griffin House, formerly the company's design and testing building. In the same year, the third-generation Vauxhall Astra went on sale (with Opel versions adopting the Astra nameplate for the first time) and the saloon version badged Astra rather than Belmont. Vauxhall joined forces with Isuzu to produce the Frontera, a four-wheel drive off-roader available in short- and long-wheelbase versions.

In 1993, the Cavalier was firmly re-established as Britain's most popular large family car, with more than 130,000 sales, while the third-generation Astra (relaunched in 1991) with 100,000 sales was continuing to narrow the gap between itself and the best-selling Ford Escort. The decade-old Nova was axed in 1993, in favour of the all-new Corsa, adopting the European naming of the model; its distinctive styling and practical interior began attracting more sales than its predecessor had done.

In 1994, GM ceased production of Bedford Vehicles because their profits were decreasing over time. Bedford Vehicles had been Vauxhall's commercial vehicle arm, making successful vans, trucks, and lorries since the 1930s. The last "true" Bedford light commercials—the Bedford HA and Bedford CF panel vans—had already ceased production in 1983 and 1987, respectively, and had been replaced by licence-built versions of Isuzu and Suzuki vans such as the Midi and Rascal. Production of these models continued at Luton, now badged Vauxhall, but built by a separate company named IBC (Isuzu-Bedford Commercials). Also in 1994, the Vauxhall Carlton nameplate was abandoned after 16 years, and Omega took its place, becoming the first model to feature the new corporate "V" grille. Vauxhall also added another vehicle to its four-wheel drive line-up in the shape of the Isuzu-based Monterey. Vauxhall joined the expanding "compact coupé" market with its new Corsa-based Tigra model.

Logo Used 1989-2008

The Cavalier nameplate was discontinued in 1995 after 20 years, a full model after Opel had dropped its Ascona nameplate, Vauxhall adopting the common Vectra nameplate for its successor, completing a policy by General Motors that aligned and identically badged all Vauxhall and Opel models. By this time, many left hand drive Opel Vectras were being produced at Vauxhall's Luton plant. The following year, Luton would become the sole source for the estate version. The Vectra received disappointing feedback from the motoring public, and several well-known journalists, including Jeremy Clarkson, yet it was still hugely popular, and for a while after the 1999 facelift, it was actually more popular than Ford's highly acclaimed Mondeo. In 1996, Vauxhall launched the short-lived Sintra large MPV. The Astra entered its fourth generation in 1998, and offered levels of build quality and handling that were better than all of its predecessors.

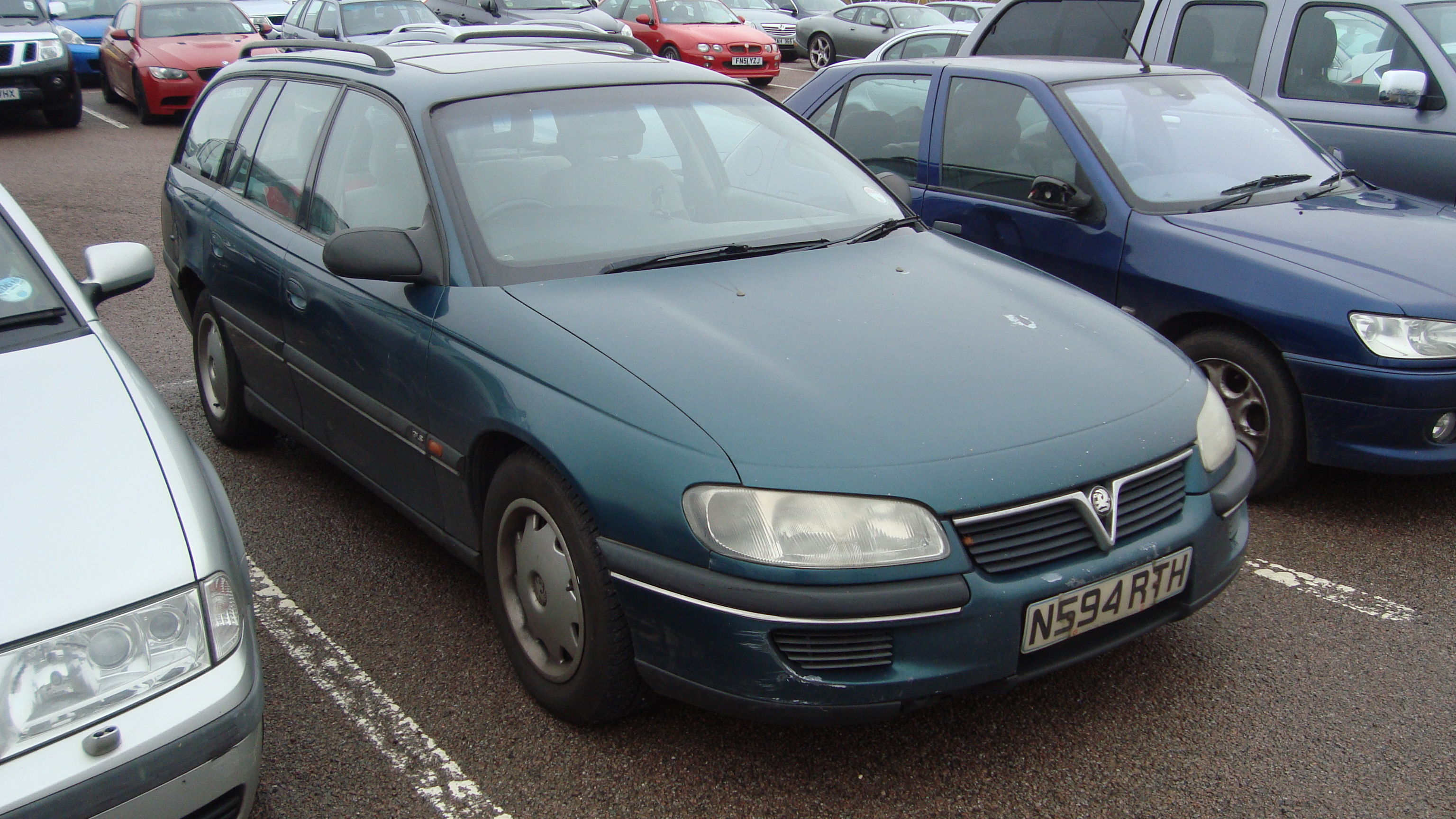
A 1995 Vauxhall Omega 2.5 TD GLS Estate

In 1999, the seven-seater compact MPV Zafira, based on the Astra chassis, went on sale and the Vauxhall Monterey was withdrawn from sale in the UK, although it continued to sell in the rest of Europe as an Opel.

In the late 1990s, Vauxhall received criticism in several high-profile car surveys. In 1998, a Top Gear customer-satisfaction survey condemned the Vauxhall Vectra as the least satisfying car to own in Britain. A year later, the Vauxhall marque was ranked last by the same magazine's customer-satisfaction survey. The Vauxhall range received particular criticism for breakdowns, build-quality problems, and many other maladies, which meant that quality did not reflect sales success. Nevertheless, Vauxhall was competing strongly in the sales charts, and by 1999 was closer to Ford in terms of sales figures than it had been in years.

==== 2000s ====
In 2000, Vauxhall entered the sports car market with the Lotus-based VX220 roadster. It re-entered the coupé market with the Astra Coupé. The new Agila city car and a second-generation Corsa supermini also went on sale. On 12 December 2000, Vauxhall announced that car production at its Luton plant would cease in 2002, with the final vehicle being made in March 2002 following the end of production of the Vectra B and production of its replacement moving to Ellesmere Port alongside the Astra. Manufacture of vans (sold under the Vauxhall, Opel, Renault, and Nissan badges throughout Europe) continued at the IBC Vehicles plant in Luton. On 17 May 2006, Vauxhall announced the loss of 900 jobs from Ellesmere Port's 3,000 staff, part of significant worldwide staff reductions by GM.

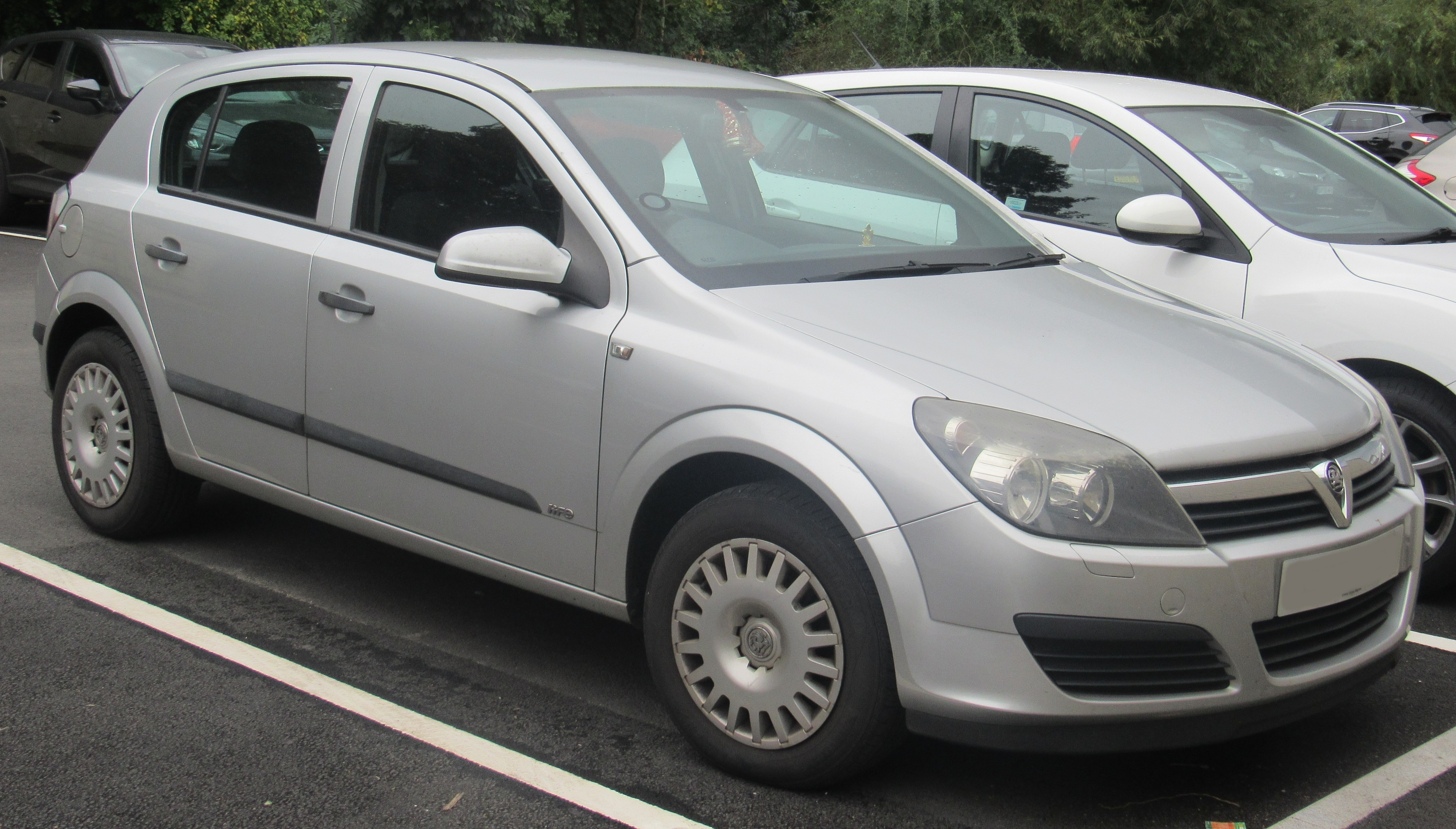
The Vauxhall Astra Mk V, in production from 2004 to 2009

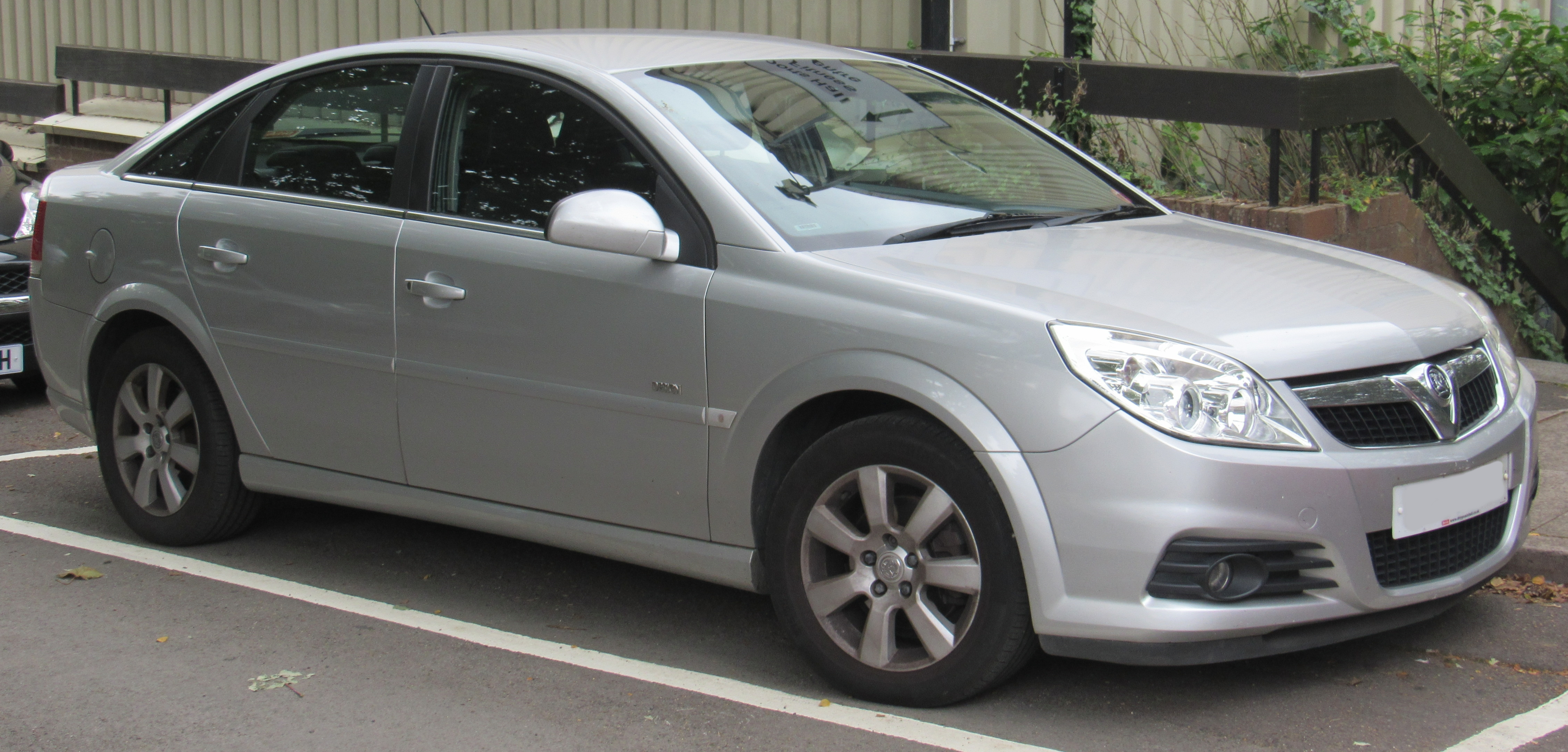
The Vauxhall Vectra Mark II, in production from 2002 to 2008

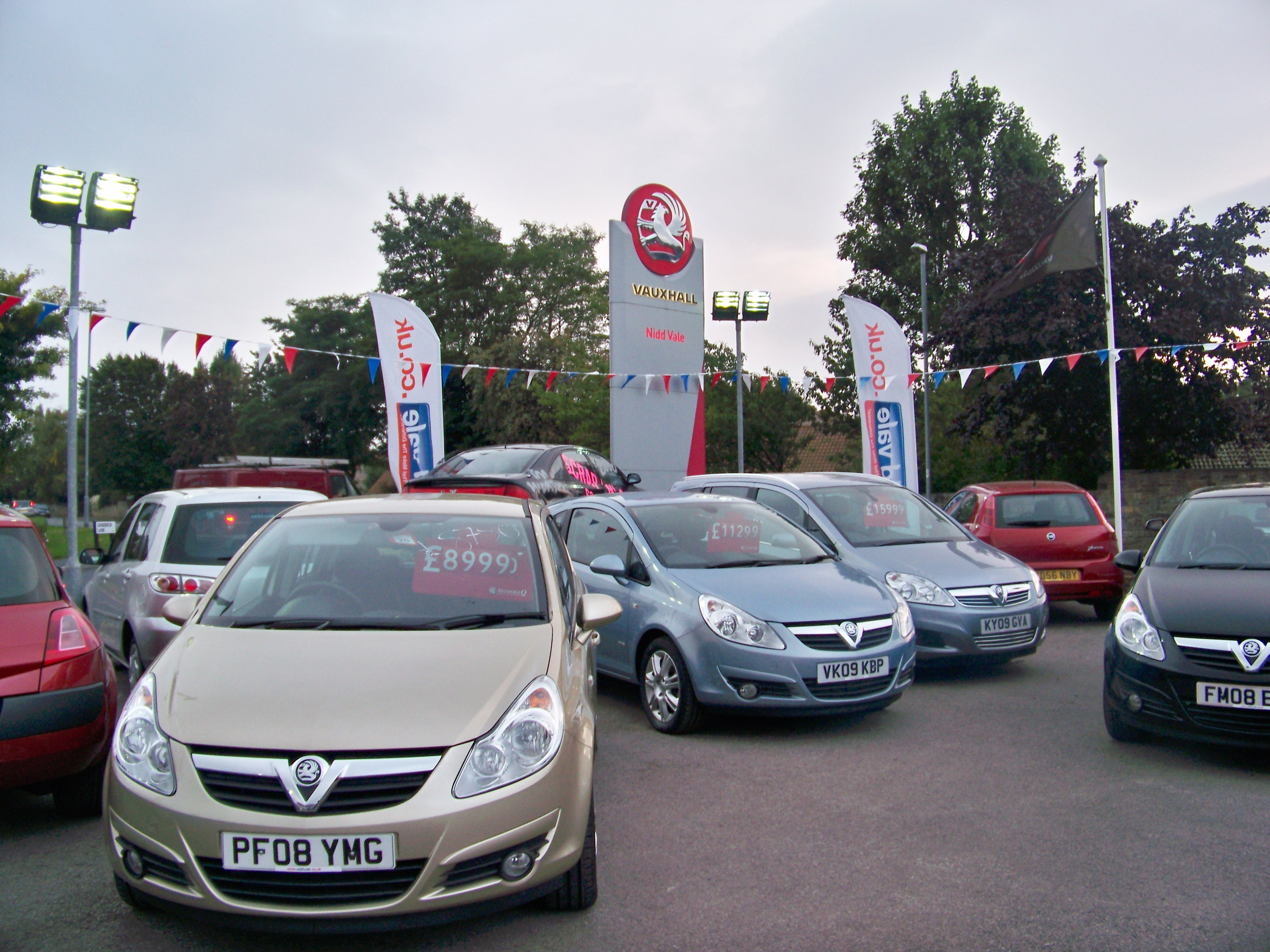
Vauxhall Corsas on sale at a former dealership in Wetherby, West Yorkshire

In 2002, the all-new Vectra went on sale, alongside a large hatchback badged as the Signum, which arrived the following year. The year 2002 was one of the best ever for Vauxhall sales in the UK. The Corsa was Britain's second-most popular new car, and gave the marque top spot in the British supermini car sales charts for the first time. The Astra was Britain's third-best selling car that year, while the Vectra and the Zafira (a compact MPV launched in 1999) were just outside the top 10. The second-generation Vectra was launched in 2002 and was further improved over earlier Vectras, but was still hardly a class-leader, and now had to be content with lower sales due to a fall in popularity of D-sector cars, although a facelift in 2005 sparked a rise in sales.

In 2003, Vauxhall Omega production ended after nine years, with no direct replacement, while the Meriva mini-MPV was launched. Perhaps the most important Vauxhall product of the 2000s so far is the fifth-generation Astra, launched in early 2004, and praised by the motoring press for its dramatic styling. It was an instant hit with buyers, and was the nation's second-best selling car in 2005 and 2006, giving the Ford Focus its strongest competitor yet. Many police forces across the United Kingdom adopted the Astra as the standard patrol vehicle (panda car). Also in 2004, production of the Frontera ended after 13 years, with no direct replacement.

In 2006, the third generation of the Vauxhall Corsa went on sale, after having its world premier launch at the 2006 British International Motor Show at ExCeL London. The second-generation Corsa had been Britain's most popular supermini for most of its production life, but by 2006, it had started to fall behind the best of its competitors, so an all-new model was launched. This Corsa sold far better than either of the previous Corsas, and it was an instant hit with buyers. Also in 2006, the second-generation Zafira was the 10th-best selling car in the UK, the first time that an MPV had featured in the top 10 in Britain.

In 2007, Vauxhall's new 4x4, the Vauxhall Antara, was released in July. Vauxhall's powerful VXR8 that came with 306 kilowatts (416 PS; 410 bhp) was also introduced.

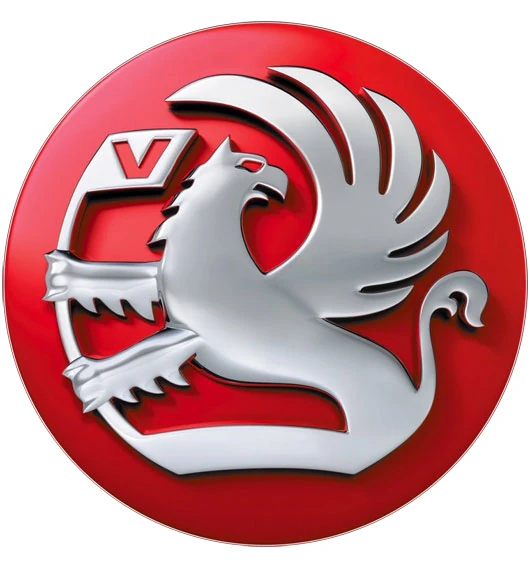
Logo Used 2003-2008

In 2008, Vauxhall began rebranding with a modified corporate logo. The Vauxhall Insignia was launched at the 2008 British International Motor Show at ExCeL London, replacing the Vectra and won another "European Car of the Year". Vauxhall launched the new Agila city car.

In 2009, a new generation of the Vauxhall Astra was launched.

On 30 May 2009, a deal was announced that was to lead to the spin-off of the Vauxhall and Opel marques into a new company. On 1 June 2009, Vauxhall Motors' troubled parent company, General Motors, filed for bankruptcy in a court in New York. By then, the sale of Vauxhall and its German sister subsidiary, Opel, was being negotiated as part of a strategy driven by the German government to ring fence the businesses from any General Motors asset liquidation. The sale to Canadian-owned Magna International was agreed on 10 September 2009, with the approval of the German government. During the announcement regarding the sale, Magna promised to keep the Vauxhall factory at Ellesmere Port open until 2013, but could not guarantee any further production after that date. On 3 November 2009, the GM board called off the Magna deal after coming to the conclusion that Opel and Vauxhall Motors was crucial to GM's global strategy.

==== 2010s ====
In 2010, the new Vauxhall Movano was launched and a new Meriva (launched at the Geneva Motor Show) went on sale in mid-2010.

The Ampera E-Rev, short for extended-range electric vehicle, went on sale in the UK in 2011 with a 16 kWh, 400-pound (180 kg) lithium-ion battery pack that delivers 40 miles (64 km) of motoring and a 1.4-litre petrol engine that extends the car's range to 350 miles (560 km). It won the "European Car of the Year". A new Vauxhall Combo went on sale in late 2011 and a facelifted Corsa went on sale in early 2011. The Zafira Tourer compact MPV was released in late 2011.

In 2012, the Vauxhall Adam city car was launched at the Paris Motor Show in late 2012, with sales beginning in early 2013. A new Vauxhall Mokka compact SUV was launched at the 2012 Geneva Motor Show.

In May 2012, GM announced plans to move much of the production of Astra vehicles from mainland Europe to the UK. The company announced it would invest £125 million in the Ellesmere Port factory and spend about £1bn in the UK component sector. It is reported that Astras produced at Ellesmere Port contain only 25% British parts, far below the typical 50 to 55% local content requirement Britain would have to agree to in bilateral trade deals.

HydroGen4 is the successor of the fuel-cell vehicle Opel HydroGen3, developed by General Motors/Opel and presented in 2007 at the IAA in Frankfurt and was expected to hit the market in 2016.

In December 2015, safety officials asked Vauxhall to initiate a full safety recall of the Zafira B model, due to a worrying level of "improper repairs"'.

=== Groupe PSA (2017–2021) ===
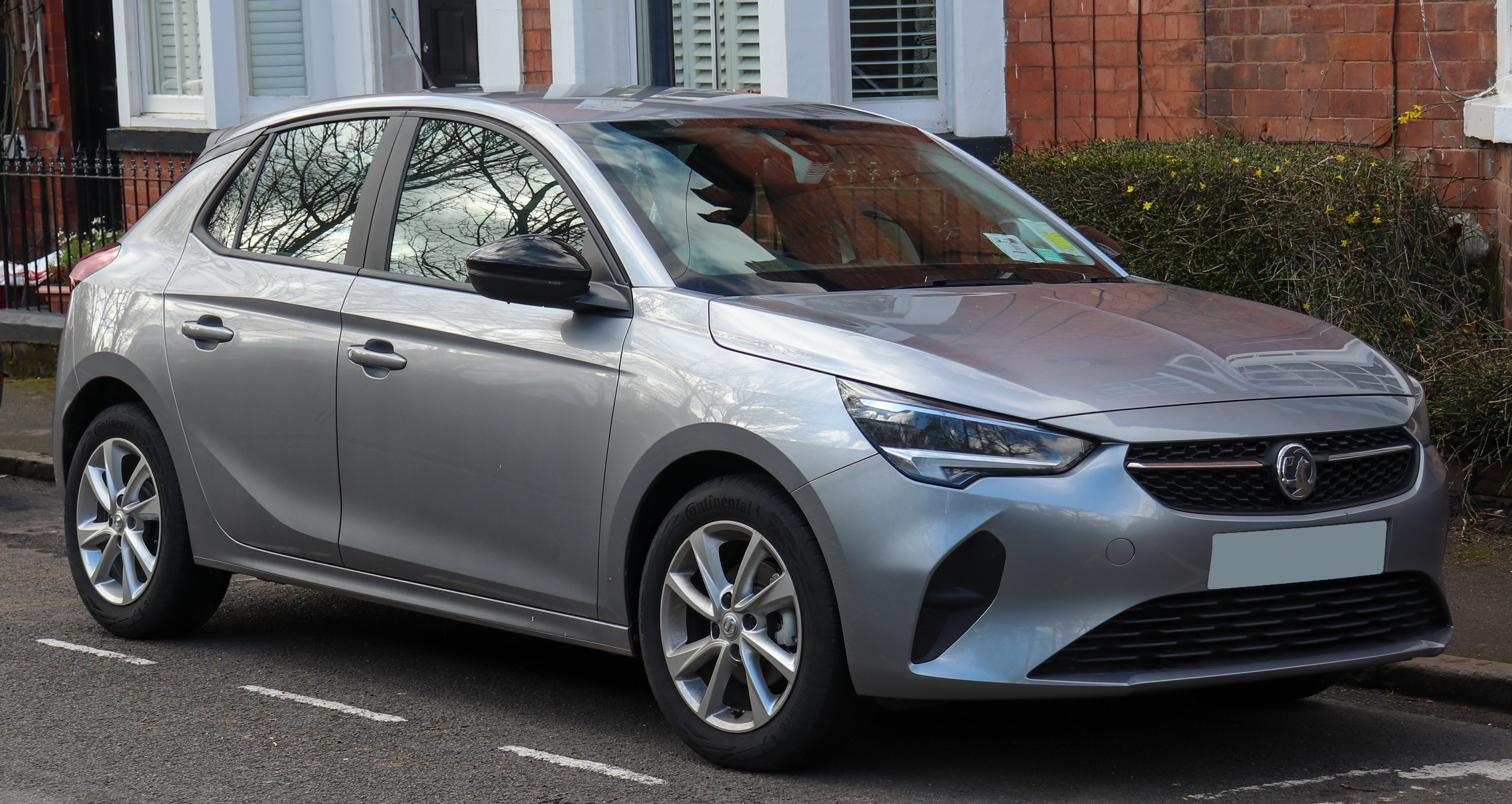
A 2019 Vauxhall Corsa, the first model to be introduced under PSA ownership

On 3 March 2017, sources revealed that the American group General Motors had reached a tentative agreement with Groupe PSA for the acquisition of the Vauxhall and Opel brands and the complete Vauxhall/Opel automobile business. On 6 March 2017, GM and Groupe PSA announced their agreement that PSA would buy GM's Vauxhall and Opel subsidiaries in a deal worth €2.2 billion. In preparation for the sale, the ownership of all GM plants and Vauxhall/Opel sales organisations in Europe (except the Turin development center, and GM Europe with the sales organisations for Cadillac and Chevrolet) was transferred to Adam Opel GmbH in Rüsselsheim, and then at end of June 2017, in one package from Adam Opel GmbH to its subsidiary Opel Automobile GmbH, whose ownership was transferred to Peugeot S.A. by 1 August 2017. The historic Adam Opel GmbH remains property of GM, with the sole purpose of paying out the factory pensions of the former Opel workers who left up to 31 July 2017.

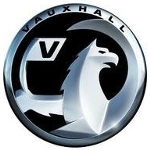
2009-2020

On 18 September 2017, Vauxhall's official company name was changed from General Motors UK Limited, in use since 16 April 2008, back to its original Vauxhall Motors Limited. On 7 May 2019, Vauxhall left its Griffin House headquarters in Luton for new offices at Chalton House, based in Chalton, on the northern outskirts of Luton.

=== Stellantis (2021–present) ===
On 16 January 2021, Groupe PSA and Fiat Chrysler Automobiles merged to form Stellantis. In 2023, the Chalton House headquarters and Vauxhall Aftersales (parts) warehouse was demolished after plans to redevelop the site for several industrial units was approved by the local councils for the site. Vauxhall's registered office in the UK is now listed as Pinley House in Coventry, along with several other legal entities associated with Stellantis. In November 2024, Stellantis announced they were closing the Luton plant and concentrating all electric van production at Ellesmere Port with ICE production transferring to plants in Europe. This would lead to the loss of up to 1,100 jobs. The Luton factory closed on 28 March 2025.

== Current model range ==
=== Passenger cars ===
The following tables list current and announced Vauxhall production vehicles as of 2022:

Model	Image	Class	Body style
Astra (A rebadged Opel Astra) (Was previously a rebadged Opel Kadett from 1980 to 1991) (Production: 1980–present)	2022_Vauxhall_Astra_GS-Line_1.2_(Front)	Small family car	Hatchback; Sports Tourer (Estate)
Corsa (A rebadged Opel Corsa) (Production: 1993–present)		Supermini	Hatchback
Mokka (A rebadged Opel Mokka) (Production: 2012–present)		Subcompact crossover SUV	Crossover SUV
Grandland (A rebadged Opel Grandland) (Production: 2017–present)		Compact crossover SUV	Crossover SUV
Combo Life (A rebadged Peugeot Rifter/Citroën Berlingo) (Production: 2018–present)		MPV	MPV
Vivaro Life (A rebadged Peugeot Traveller/Citroën SpaceTourer) (Production: 2019–present)		MPV	MPV
Frontera (A rebadged Opel Frontera (2024)) (Production: 2024–present)		Subcompact crossover SUV	Crossover SUV

=== Commercial vehicles ===
Model	Image	Class	Body style
Combo (A rebadged Peugeot Partner/Citroën Berlingo) (Was previously a rebadged Opel Combo from 1993 to 2012) (Was previously a rebadged Fiat Doblò from 2012 to 2018) (Production: 1993–present)		Panel van	Van
Movano (A rebadged Fiat Ducato) (Was previously a rebadged Renault Master from 1998 to 2021) (Production: 1998–present)		Light commercial vehicle	Van; Chassis cab; Crew cab
Vivaro (A rebadged Peugeot Expert/Citroën Jumpy) (Was previously a rebadged Renault Trafic from 2001 to 2019) (Production: 2001–present)		Light commercial vehicle	Van; Chassis cab

=== VXR models ===
The VXR range was analogous to the OPC range made by Opel Performance Center in Europe and the HSV range made by Holden Special Vehicles in Australia. The VXR models ranged from hot hatchbacks such as the Corsa VXR and Astra VXR, to imported Australian muscle cars including the Monaro, VXR8 and VXR8 Maloo as well as high-performance variants of family cars.

The VXR badge was intended to be a symbol of the combined technological resources of the global General Motors group, and the recognised expertise of consultants Lotus and the Triple Eight Racing team.

Since the purchase of the Vauxhall marque by Stellantis (then PSA Group) in 2017, the VXR brand has been ushered into hiatus. The below table shows all VXR vehicles produced by, or marketed by Vauxhall to date.

Corsa VXR	Supermini	Hatchback
Astra VXR	Small family car	Hatchback Coupé
Vectra VXR	Large family car	Saloon; Hatchback; Sports Tourer (Estate)
Insignia VXR	Large family car	Saloon; Hatchback; Sports Tourer (Estate)
VXR8	Large family car	Saloon
Meriva VXR	Mini MPV	MPV
Zafira VXR	MPV	MPV
VX220	Roadster	Coupé; Convertible
Monaro VXR	Muscle car	Coupé
VXR8 Maloo	Ute	Pick-up

== Previous models ==
=== Passenger cars ===
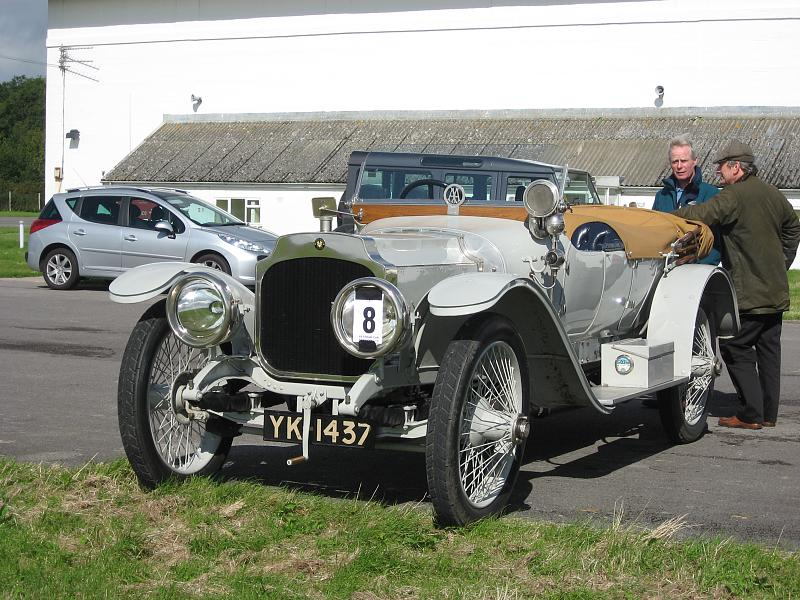
A-Type open tourer

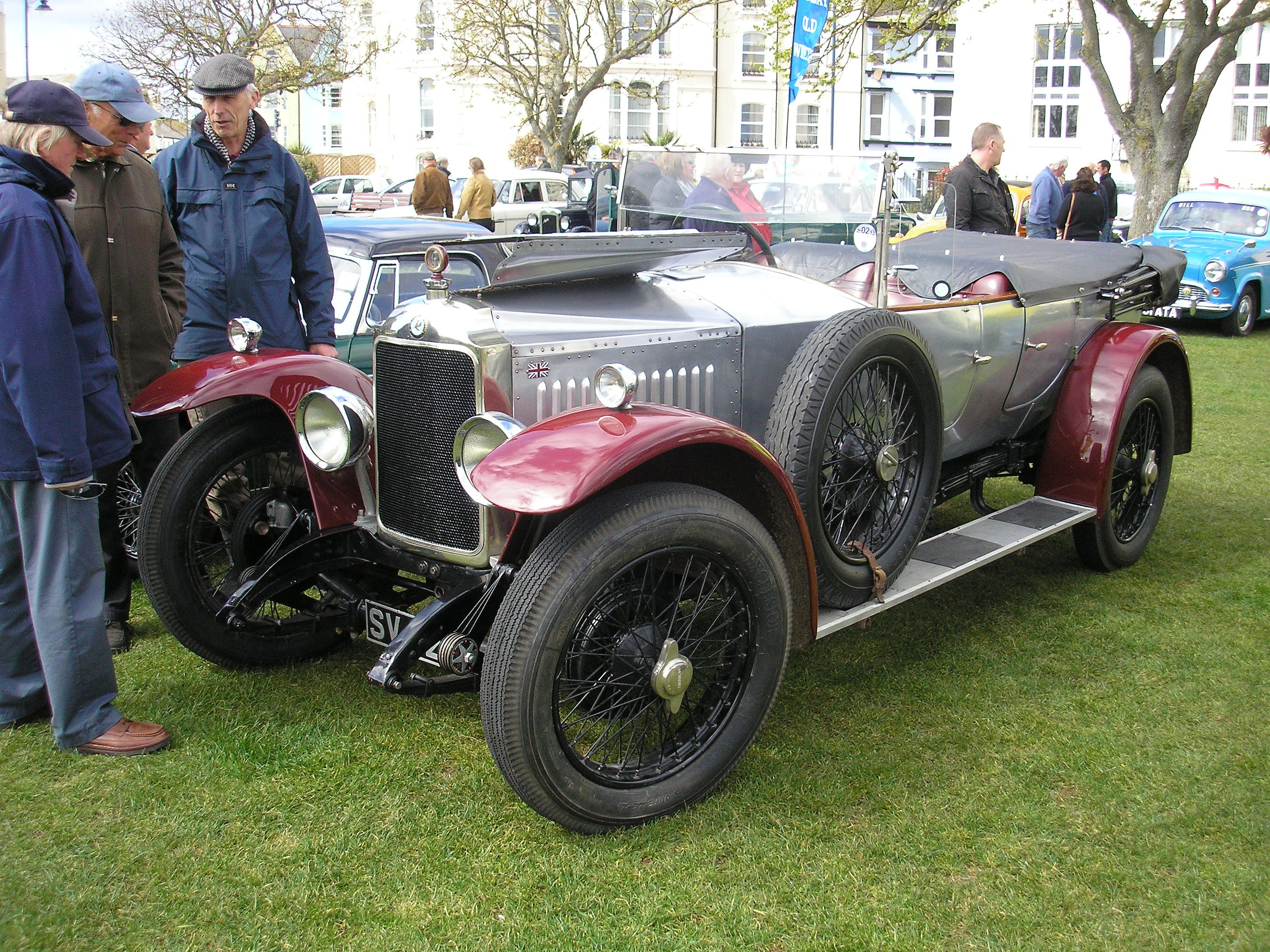
14–40 open tourer

Cars designed by independent Vauxhall:

- 1-Cylinder (1903–1904)
- 3-Cylinder (1904–1907)
- 4-Cylinder (1905–1910)
- A-Type (1908–1915)
- B-Type (1910–1915)
- C-Type "Prince Henry" (1911–1914)
- D-type (1912–1922)
- E-type (1913–1927)
- 23–60 (1922–1925)
- 14 and 14–40 (1922–1927)
- 25–70 (1925–1927)

Cars designed after acquisition by General Motors:

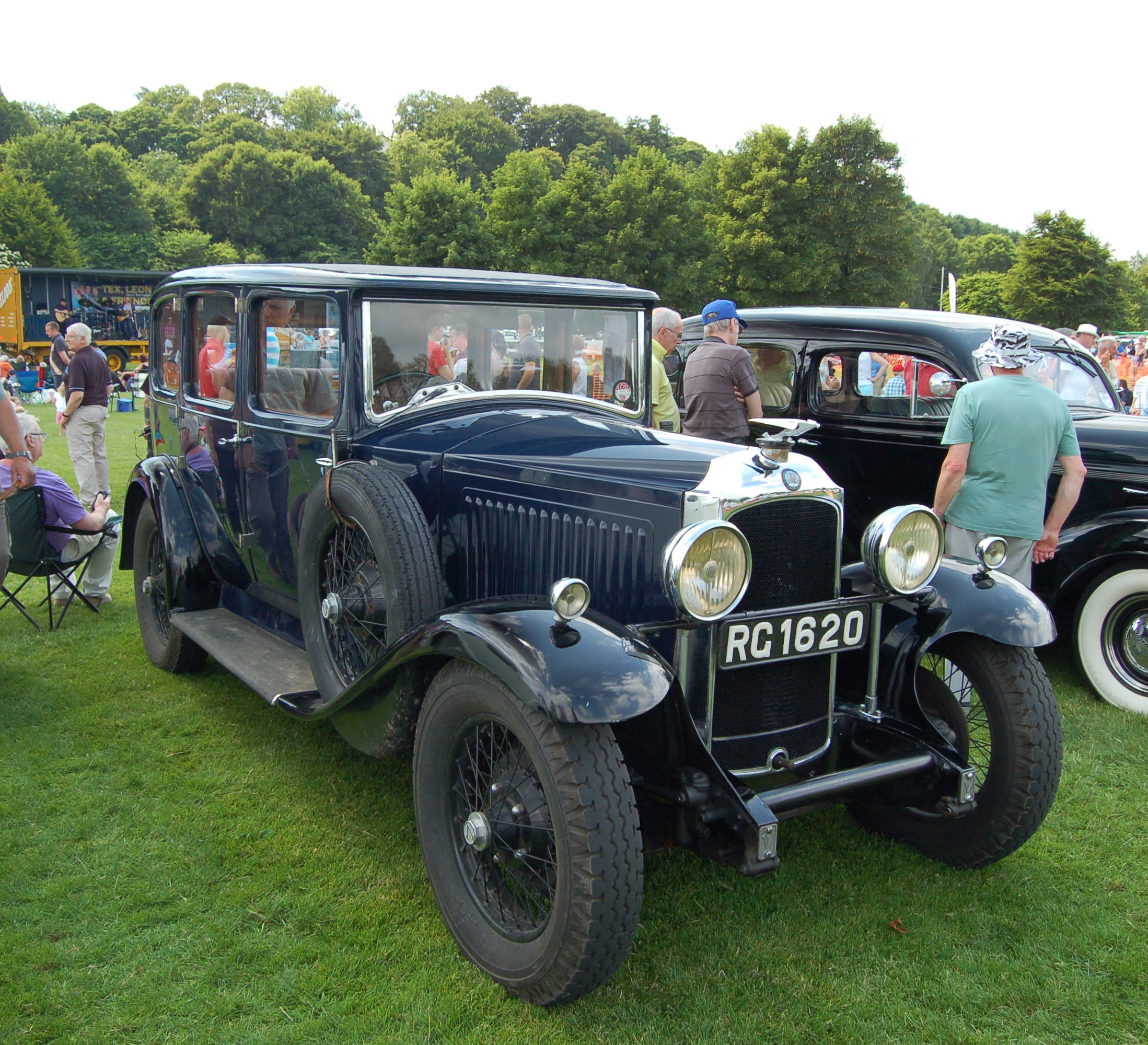
20–60 saloon 1930

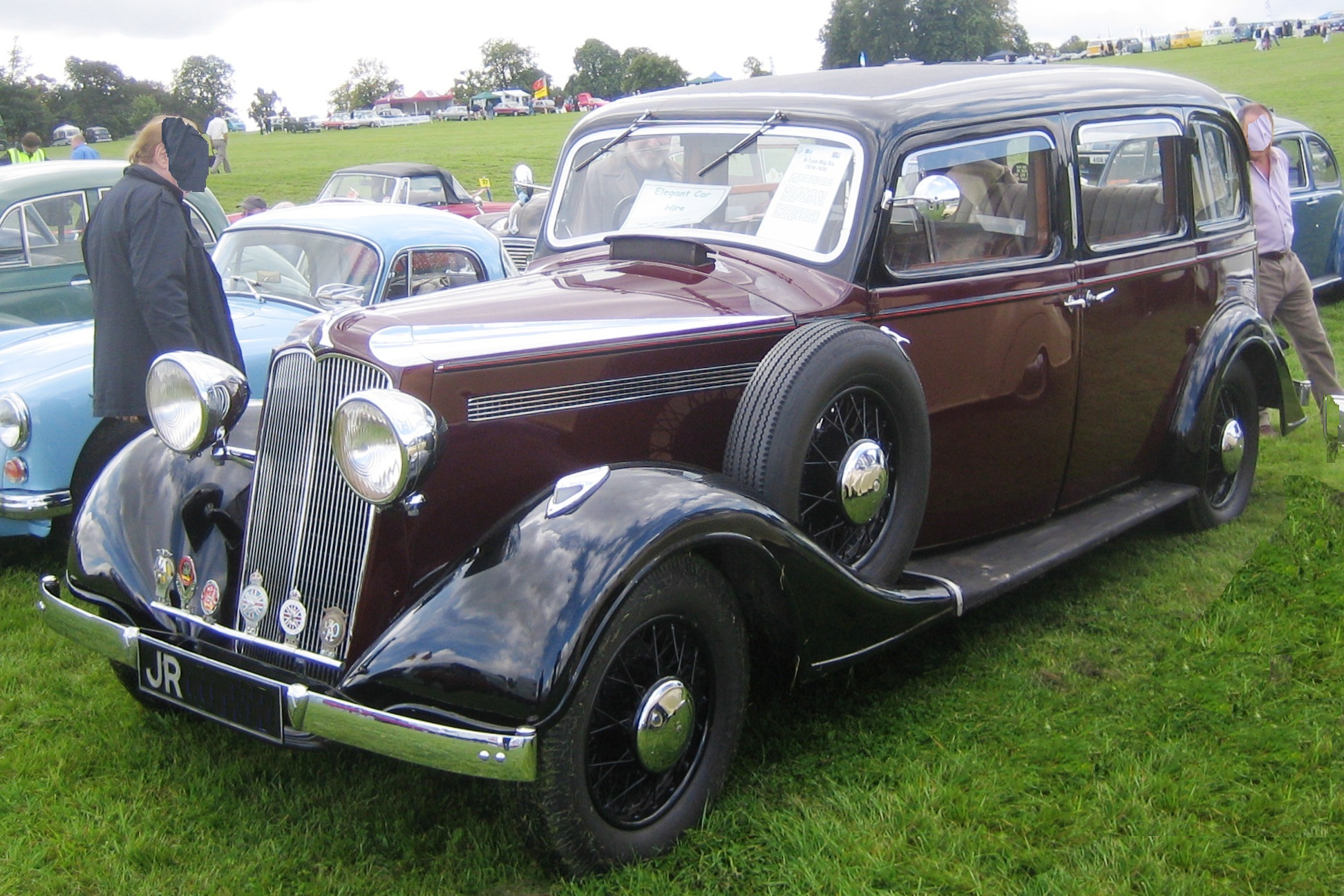
Big Six limousine 1936

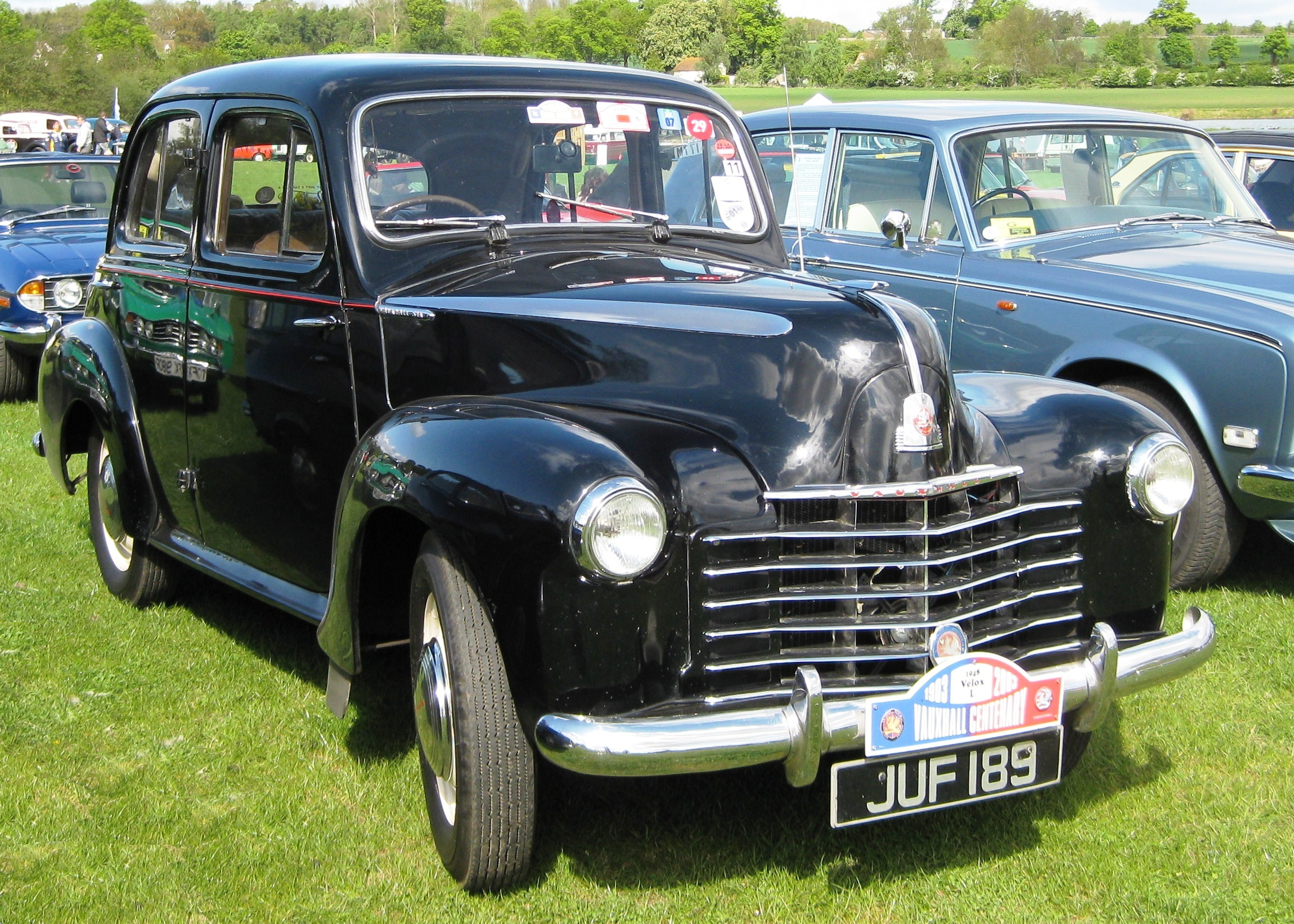
Velox 4-door Saloon 1948

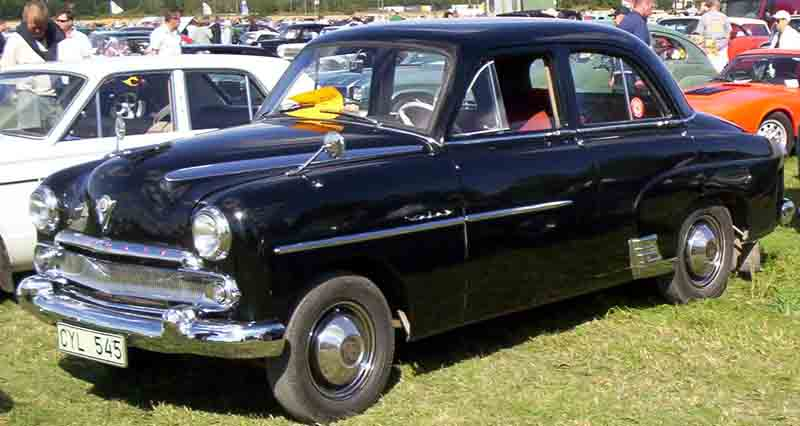
Velox 4-door Saloon 1955

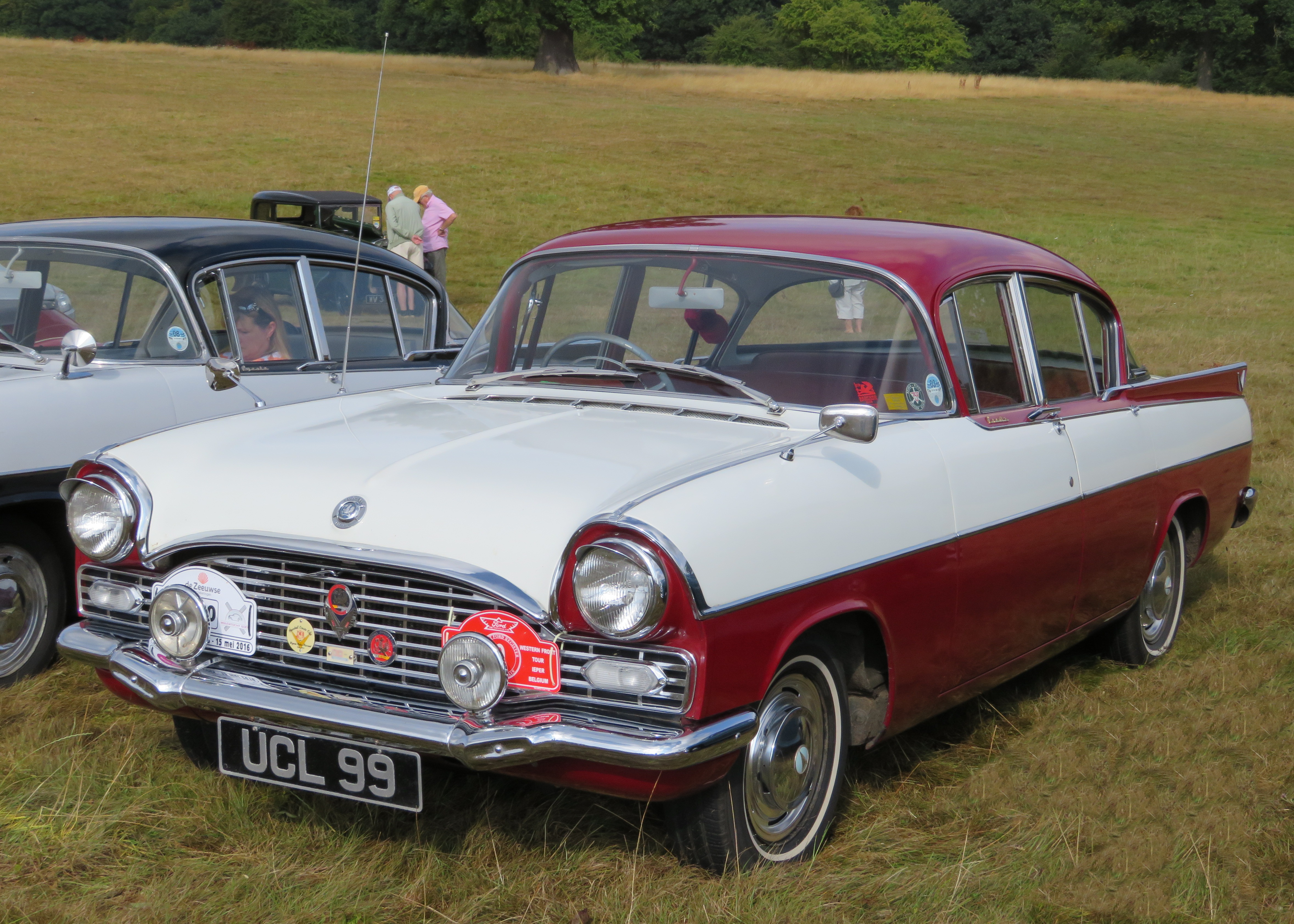
Cresta 4-door Saloon 1962

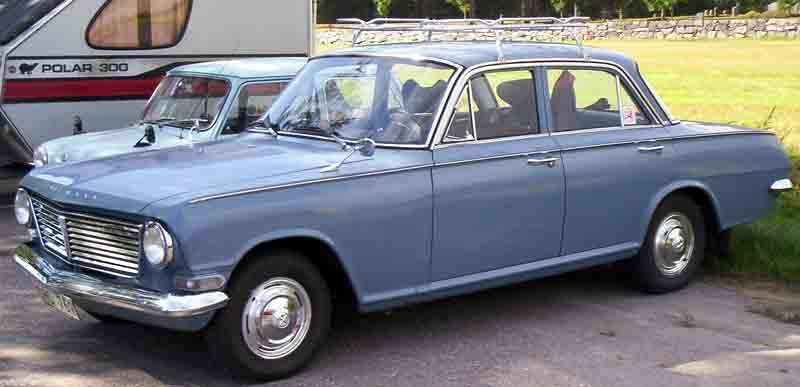
Velox 4-door Saloon 1963

- 20-60 (1927–1930)
  - 80 (1930–1933)
- Cadet (1931–1933)
- Light Six (1933–1939)
- Big Six (1933–1940)
- 12-4 (1937–1946)
  - 10-4 (1937–1947)
- 14-6 (1939–1948)
- Wyvern (1948–1957)
  - Velox (1948–1965)
    - Cresta (1954–1972)
      - Viscount (1966–1972)
- Victor (1957–1978)
  - VX4/90 (1961–1972, performance version of Victor)
  - Ventora (1968–1978)
- Viva (1963) (1963–1979)
  - Firenza (1971–1975)
  - Magnum (1973–1978)
- Chevette (1975–1984, rebadged Opel Kadett)
  - Belmont (1986–1991, rebadged Opel Kadett)
- Cavalier (1975–1995, rebadged Opel Ascona (Cavalier Mk 1 (sedan) (1975–1981) & Cavalier Mk 2 (1981–1988)) / Opel Manta (Cavalier Mk 1 (coupe) (1975–1981)) / Opel Vectra (Cavalier Mk 3 (1988–1995)))
  - Calibra (1990–1997, rebadged Opel Calibra)
  - Vectra (1995–2008, rebadged Opel Vectra)
    - Signum (2003–2008, rebadged Opel Signum)
- Viceroy (1978–1982, rebadged Opel Commodore)
  - Royale (1978–1983, rebadged Opel Senator (sedan) / Opel Monza (coupe))
    - Senator (1983–1993, rebadged Opel Senator)
  - Carlton (1978–1994, rebadged Opel Rekord (Carlton Mk 1 (1978–1986)) / Opel Omega (Carlton Mk 2 (1986–1994)))
    - Omega (1994–2003, rebadged Opel Omega)
- Nova (1983–1993, rebadged Opel Corsa)
- Albany (1990–1994, rebadged Isuzu Fargo)
- Frontera (1991) (1991–2004, rebadged Isuzu MU Wizard)
- Brava (1992–2002, rebadged Isuzu Faster)
- Monterey (1994–1998, rebadged Isuzu Trooper)
- Tigra (1994) (1994–2001, rebadged Opel Tigra)
  - Tigra (2004) (2004–2009, rebadged Opel Tigra)
- Sintra (1996–1999, rebadged Chevrolet Venture)
- Zafira (1999–2018, rebadged Opel Zafira)
- Agila (2000–2014, rebadged Suzuki Solio (Agila Mk 1 (2000–2008)) / Suzuki Splash (Agila Mk 2 (2008–2014)))
- Monaro (2001–2005, rebadged Holden Monaro)
- VX220 (2001–2005, rebadged Opel Speedster)
- Meriva (2003–2017, rebadged Opel Meriva)
- Antara (2006–2015, rebadged Opel Antara)
- VXR8 (2007–2017, rebadged HSV Clubsport (VXR8 Mk 1 (2007–2010)) / HSV GTS (VXR8 Mk 2 (2011–2017)))
  - VXR8 Maloo (2008–2013, rebadged HSV Maloo)
- Insignia (2008–2022, rebadged Opel Insignia)
- Ampera (2012–2015, rebadged Chevrolet Volt)
- Cascada (2013–2018, rebadged Opel Cascada)
- Adam (2013–2019, rebadged Opel Adam)
- Viva (2015) (2015–2019, rebadged Chevrolet Spark)

Cars designed after acquisition by PSA/Stellantis:

- Crossland (2017–2024, rebadged Opel Crossland)

=== Commercial vehicles ===
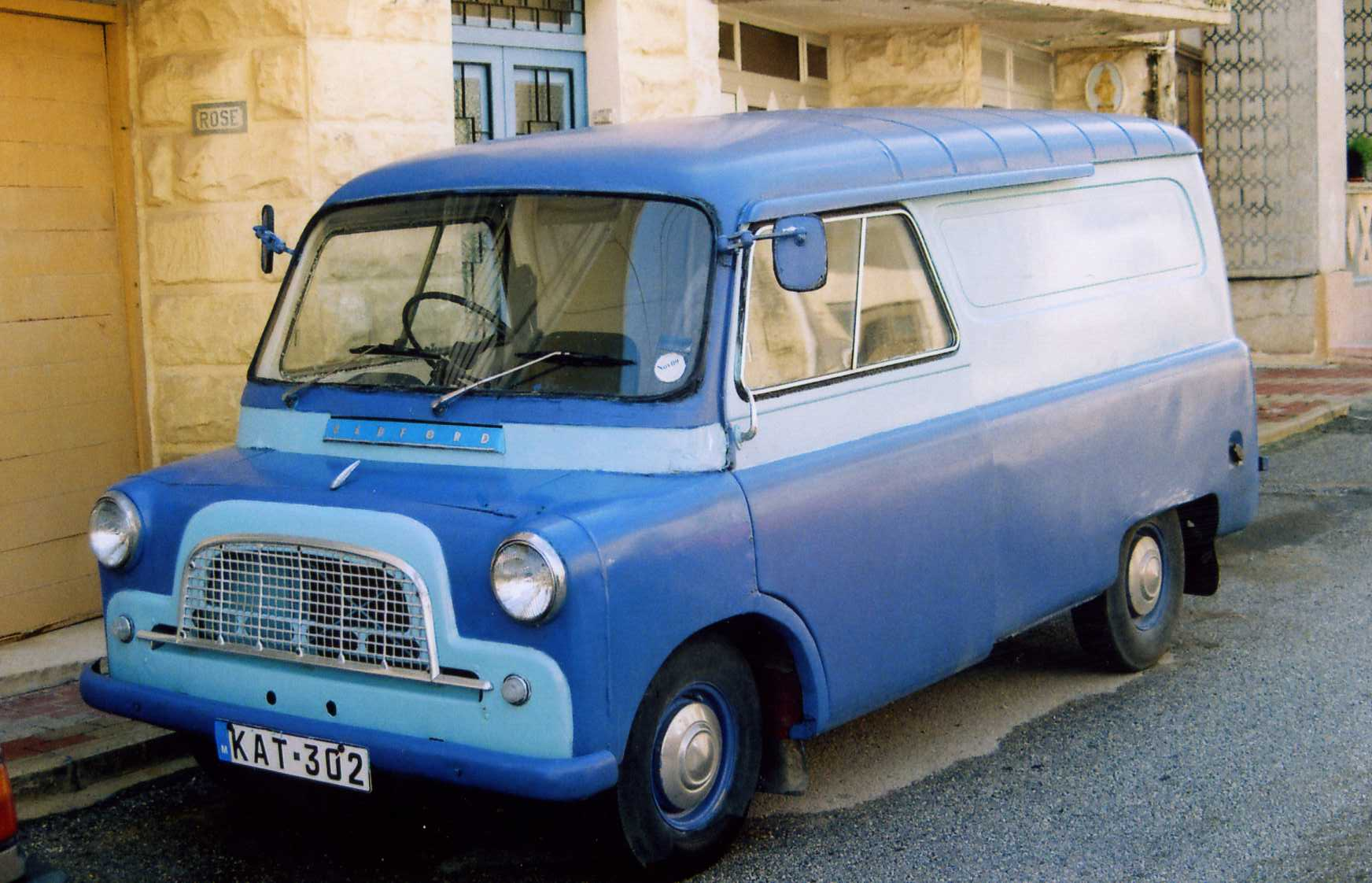
A Bedford CA panel van

Bedford branded

- HC (1938–1952)
- OB (1939–1951)
- M-Series (1939–1952)
- OY (1939–1953)
- S (1950–1959)
- SB (1950–1986)
- CA (1952–1969)
- TA (1953–1958)
  - TJ (1958–1986)
- TK (1960–1986)
- HA (1963–1983)
  - Beagle (1964–1973)
- VAL (1965–1975)
- CF (1969–1988)
- Y-Series (1971–1986)
- TM (1974–1986)
- KB (1976–1988, rebadged Isuzu Faster)
- TL (1980–1986)
- Dormobile

Vauxhall branded

- Midi (1985–1994, rebadged Isuzu Fargo)
- Astramax (1986–1993, rebadged Opel Combo)
- Rascal (1986–1993, rebadged Suzuki Carry (truck) / Suzuki Every (van))
- Brava (1992–2002, rebadged Isuzu Faster)
- Arena (1997–2001, rebadged Renault Trafic)

== Concept cars ==
- GT (1964)
- XVR (1966)
- SRV (1970)
- Scamp (1974)
- Silver Bullet (1976)
- Equus (1978)
- Silver Aero (1980)
- VX Lightning (2003)

== Relationship with other GM products ==
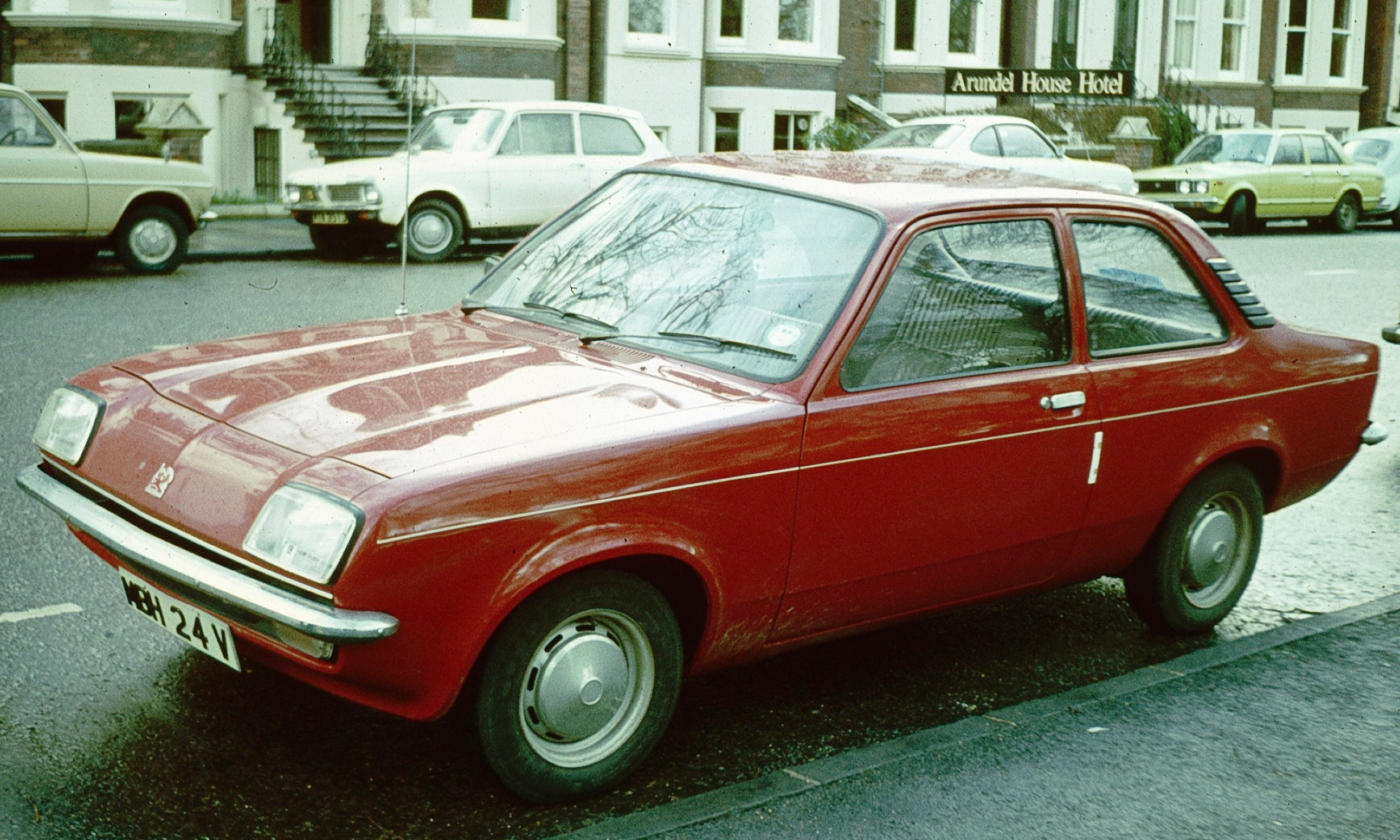
The Vauxhall Chevette (derived from the Opel Kadett C), in production from 1975 to 1984

General Motors began to merge the product lines of Vauxhall and Opel in the early 1970s, and by the end of the decade had replaced the entire range of cars with a new family of Opel developed models, which initially were substantially modified by Vauxhall for the British market, but eventually this practice was replaced by a policy of badge engineering, where Vauxhall vehicles would be differentiated from their Opel counterparts only on badging, trim and specification. It also heralded an era when GM started to leverage other parts of its empire to develop a series of globally shared vehicle platforms, powertrains and entire models across its various subsidiaries (examples included the T-body and J-body platforms) which saw Vauxhall vehicles contain commonality with other GM products throughout the world.

The 1963 HA Viva was developed under some secrecy and exhibited remarkable similarities with the Opel Kadett released a year previously, while the 1972 FE Victor was essentially the first overt exponent of this strategy, sharing its platform and several body fittings with the Opel Rekord D, although it still retained Vauxhall-designed running gear and had no interchangeable body panels. By this point, GM had begun to map out a shared platform strategy for Vauxhall, Opel and Holden, with four basic size classes—the S-body (supermini), T-body (sub-compact), U-body (extended subcompact), and V-body (executive). The T-body was the first to be unveiled in the form of the Opel Kadett C in 1973. Vauxhall had developed its own concept for the smaller S-body car which would have featured front-wheel drive, but for budgetary reasons the S-car project was abandoned and merged with the T-body project with the car emerging as the Vauxhall Chevette in 1975, essentially being the Opel Kadett C featuring 'Droopsnoot' styling (first prototyped on the HPF Firenza), but with an iteration of the hatchback body shell developed as part of the S-body studies. (the S-body designation was later resurrected for the Corsa A/Nova in 1982). The Chevette would later be made available in all of the equivalent Opel Kadett body styles except the coupe.

The larger U-body car was similarly supposed to have Vauxhall-specific bodywork, but GM management cancelled its development months from its release and the resulting Cavalier emerged in 1975 as a rebadged Opel Ascona B with the similarly modified front and rear styling as the Chevette. The range-topping V-body cars were the last to emerge in 1978, to replace the FE Victor, the first being the Carlton—essentially the Opel Rekord E, with a droopsnoot nose and lightly modified interior. The flagship members of the V-body family—the Viceroy and Royale—were rebadged versions of the Opel Commodore C and Senator/Monza, respectively, imported from Germany. The V-body was also adapted for the Australian market in the form of the Holden Commodore.

Therefore, by the end of the 1970s most Vauxhalls were based on Opel designs, but with Vauxhall engines preserved in the form of the Viva-sourced 1256 unit fitted to the Chevette and Cavalier, and the much larger 2279cc slant-four for the homologation-special Chevette HS. These were also sold in left-hand drive in continental European markets, including the Netherlands, Belgium, the Scandinavian countries, Italy and Portugal, in competition with their Opel counterparts.

With the 1979 demise of the last Vauxhall car developed with no Opel influence—the Viva (although the last Vauxhall designed vehicle overall to go out of production was the Bedford CF panel van in 1986)—GM policy was for future Vauxhall models to be, in effect, rebadged Opels, designed and developed primarily in Rüsselsheim. The original Astra, launched in 1980, set the eventual precedent for all GM Europe vehicles from that point onward—apart from the badging it had no styling or engineering difference from its Opel sister—the Kadett D. Until the early 1980s, GM dealers in the United Kingdom sold highly similar Opel and Vauxhall models alongside each other, Opel having been introduced in 1967, and by 1980 the two marques were still competing with each other with a near identical product range. This policy of duplication was phased out when Opel and Vauxhall formally combined their British marketing operations in 1981. The Vauxhall and Opel dealer networks were merged and rebranded as "Vauxhall-Opel". By 1982, most of the Opel lineup was discontinued in the United Kingdom in favour of their Vauxhall badged equivalents. Opel was instead repositioned as a performance-luxury brand—the Opel Manta coupé remained, whilst the Vauxhall Royale was replaced in the line-up by its Opel equivalent (the Senator/Monza). However, this strategy was gradually abandoned—the Senator reverted to being badged as a Vauxhall for the 1985 model year, and the Opel Monza disappeared at the end of 1987, whilst the Manta was withdrawn in 1988.

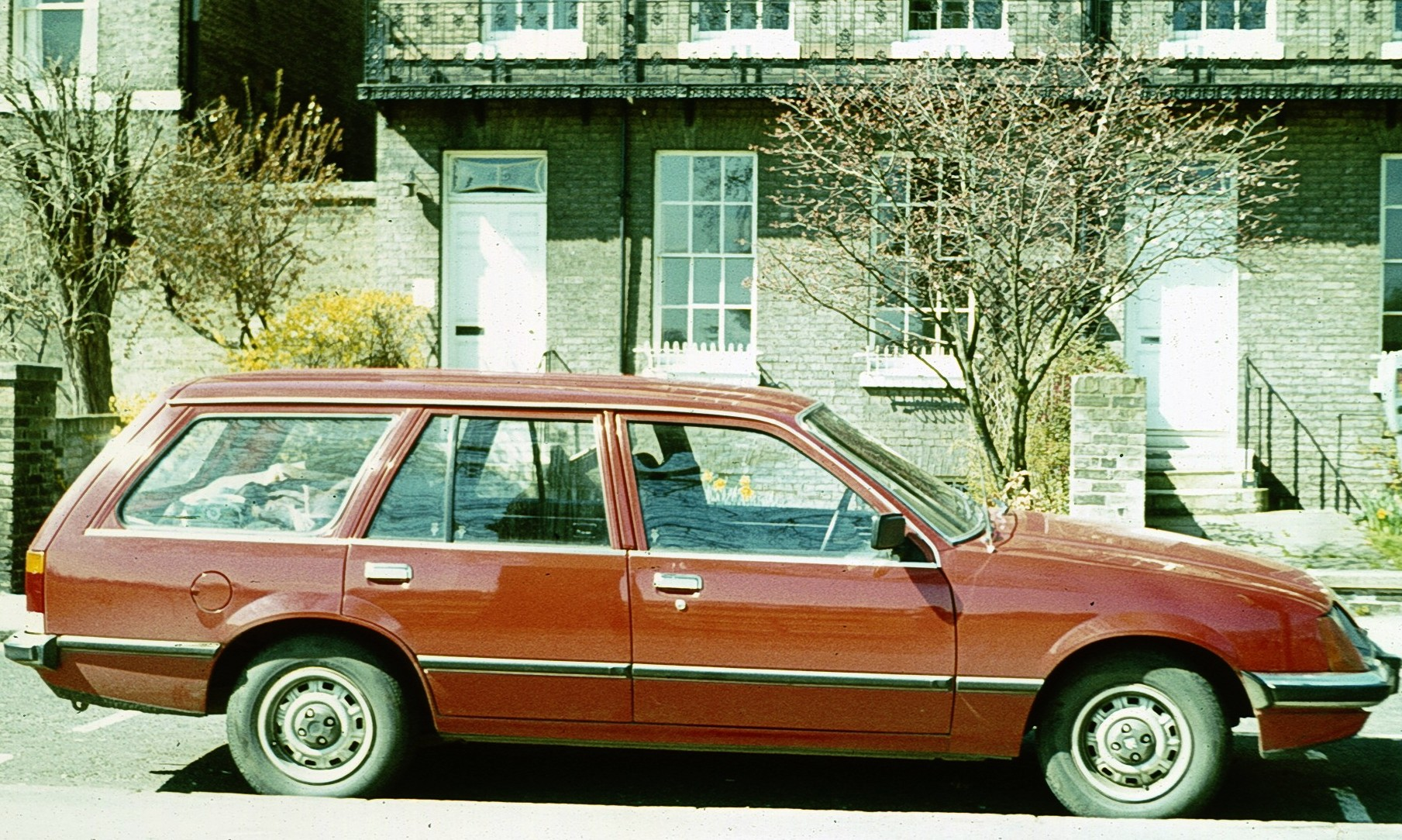
The Carlton Mark I Estate, in production from 1978 to 1986.

Similarly, the Vauxhall marque was dropped by GM in Ireland in favour of the German brand Opel. Other RHD markets such as Malta and Cyprus soon following. In New Zealand, the marque was withdrawn in favour of Holden after the demise of the Chevette. GM Europe then began to standardise model names across both brands in the early 1990s. The Vauxhall Astra and Opel Kadett, for example, were both called Astra from 1991 onwards and the Vauxhall Nova (Opel Corsa A) assumed the Corsa name for its next generation in 1993. The change was completed in 1995 when the Vauxhall Cavalier Mk 3 (Opel Vectra A) was replaced by the Opel Vectra B, called Vauxhall Vectra. Apart from the VX220, sold by Opel as the Speedster, all of Vauxhall's subsequent models have had the same names as those of Opel. However, the 2015 Viva revives earlier practice due to its Opel equivalent, the Karl, intentionally invoking Karl Opel, the second proprietor of the Opel business. Despite this, the Adam, named after his father and the founder of the company, is sold in Britain without a name change, potentially as it appears less overtly German.

From 1994, Vauxhall models differed from Opels in their distinctive grille—featuring a "V", incorporating the Vauxhall badge. This was also used by Holden in New Zealand on both the Astra and Vectra, by Chevrolet in Brazil on the Mk1 Chevrolet Astra (Opel Astra F) and on the Indian version of the Opel Astra. The "V" badging was an echo of the fluted V-shaped bonnets that had been used in some form on all Vauxhall cars since the very first. The "V" grille was not, however, used on the Vectra-replacing Insignia, unveiled in 2008 and the 2009 Vauxhall Astra and the 2010 Vauxhall Meriva. All the above, plus the US Saturn brand up to its demise in 2009, used the same grille bar with the "V" almost entirely muted out. These bars all carried identical badge mounts, enabling the marque's badges to be readily interchangeable. The Opel-badged versions in right-hand-drive form still, however, find their way into the United Kingdom; either as grey imports from Ireland or Malta, or are sold as new from car supermarkets who have sourced Irish specification vehicles in bulk.

A model unique to the Vauxhall range was the high-performance Monaro coupé, which was sourced from and designed by Holden in Australia. Although this model was also produced in left hand drive (LHD) for markets like the US (where it was known as the Pontiac GTO) and for the Middle East (as the Chevrolet Lumina Coupe), the model was not offered by Opel in mainland Europe. Imports of this vehicle were limited to 15,000 to avoid additional safety testing. Other vehicles confirmed by Vauxhall, but not by Opel, were the Holden Commodore SS-V and the HSV GTS. Vauxhall confirmed the importation of the GTS just after the reborn Opel GT roadster was announced as not being imported into the UK ... and the bulk of Holden/HSV cars that were imported post-2006 were badged as the Vauxhall VXR8 saloon.

The bodywork for the Holden Camira estate was used for the Vauxhall Cavalier estate in the UK (though not for the identical Opel Ascona in the rest of Europe)—conversely the rear bodywork of the T-car Vauxhall Chevette estate and Bedford Chevanne van was used for the respective Holden Gemini versions. Vauxhall's compact car, the Viva, formed the basis of the first HB-series Holden Torana in Australia in 1967.

Many cars badged as Opels, even LHD models, are produced by Vauxhall for export. Vauxhall has built some Holdens for export, too, notably Vectra-As to New Zealand and Astra-Bs to both Australia and New Zealand.

Vauxhall	Opel
1963 HA Viva (platform only)	Kadett A
1966 HB Viva (platform only)	Kadett B
1969 Bedford CF	Blitz (Vauxhall-designed)
1970 HC Viva (platform only)	Ascona A
1972 FE Victor (platform only)	Rekord D
1975 Chevette	Kadett C
1975 Cavalier Mk.I	Ascona B
1975 Cavalier Coupe	Manta B
1977 Cavalier Sports Hatch	Manta B
1978 Carlton Mk.I	Rekord E
1978 Viceroy	Commodore C
1978 Royale	Senator A
1978 Royale Coupe	Monza A1
1979 Astra Mk.I	Kadett D
1981 Cavalier Mk.II	Ascona C
1983 Nova	Corsa A
1984 Astra Mk.II *	Kadett E
1986 Carlton Mk.II	Omega A
1988 Cavalier Mk.III	Vectra A
2001 VX220	Speedster
2015 Viva	Karl

- = Note saloon Astra Mark 2 were called Vauxhall Belmont.

== Operations ==
Vauxhall is registered in Coventry but its factory is in Ellesmere Port, near Liverpool. The Ellesmere Port plant currently employs around 1,880 staff and has a capacity of approximately 187,000 units. The plant site has a total area of 13.02 million square feet (1,209,366 square metres). The plant currently produces the Astra and Astra Sports Tourer.

The brand had manufacturing in Bedfordshire. Its last plant in the county (in Luton and once owned by former sister company IBC Vehicles) employed around 900 staff and had a capacity of approximately 100,000 units. The plant site's total area was 4.17 million square feet (387,000 square metres). Before closing, it produced the Vivaro light commercial van.

From 1942 to 1987 Vauxhall operated a truck and bus vehicle assembly plant in Dunstable, Bedfordshire. Developed and opened by Vauxhall in 1942 under instruction from the Ministry of Production as a shadow factory, it became a production site for Bedford Vehicles in the 1950s.

Vauxhall's original car plant in Luton stood next to the commercial vehicle plant. After production ceased there in 2002, the plant was demolished and, after several proposals for redevelopment, permission was granted for the site to be redeveloped as the Napier Park in January 2014.

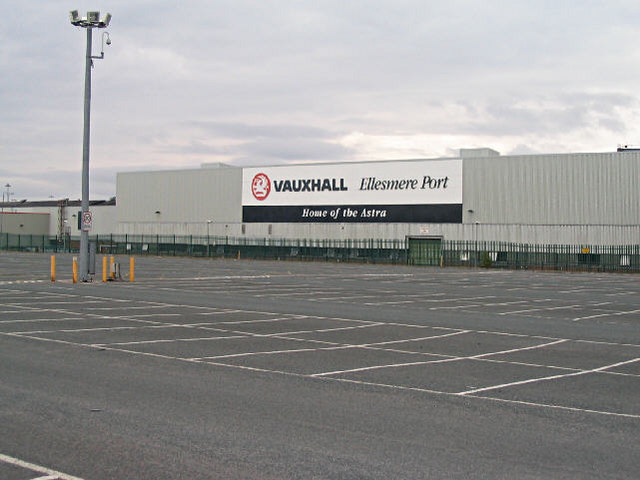
Vauxhall Ellesmere Port

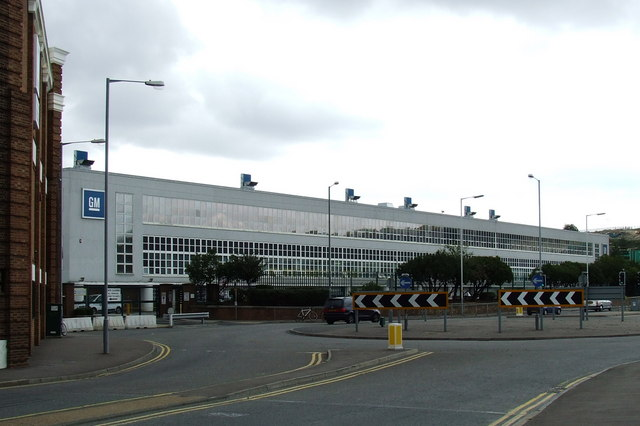
IBC Vehicles Luton plant

== Logo ==
The griffin emblem, which is still in use, is derived from the coat of arms of Falkes de Breauté, a mercenary soldier who was granted the Manor of Luton for services to King John in the thirteenth century. By marriage, he also gained the rights to an area near London, south of the Thames. The house he built, Fulk's Hall, became known in time as Vauxhall. Vauxhall Iron Works adopted this emblem from the coat of arms to emphasise its links to the local area. When Vauxhall Iron Works moved to Luton in 1905, the griffin emblem coincidentally returned to its ancestral home.

The logo as pictured used to be square, but it is now circular, to enable it to fit in the same recess designed for the circular Opel emblem. Since the 1920s, the griffin has been redesigned and released nine times. 2008 saw the release of a revised version of the 2005 logo. Bill Parfitt, chairman and managing director of GM UK, said, "While the new-look Griffin pays homage to our 100-year-plus manufacturing heritage in the UK, it also encapsulates Vauxhall's fresh design philosophy, first showcased in the current Astra, and set to continue with Insignia."

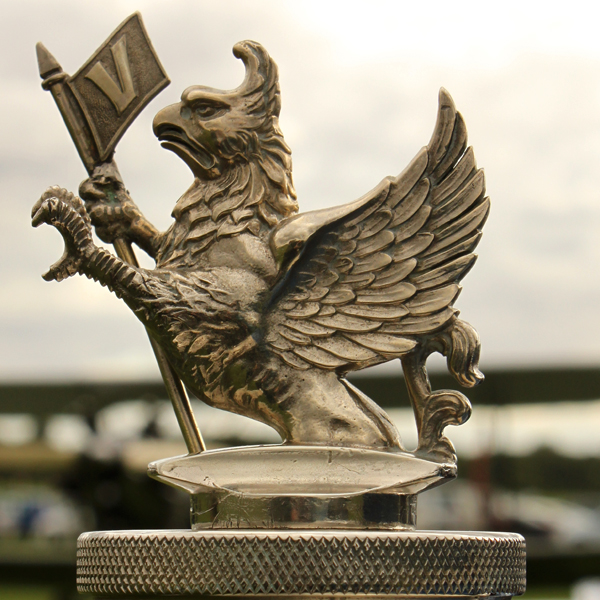
The Vauxhall Griffin from Vauxhall D-type (1920)

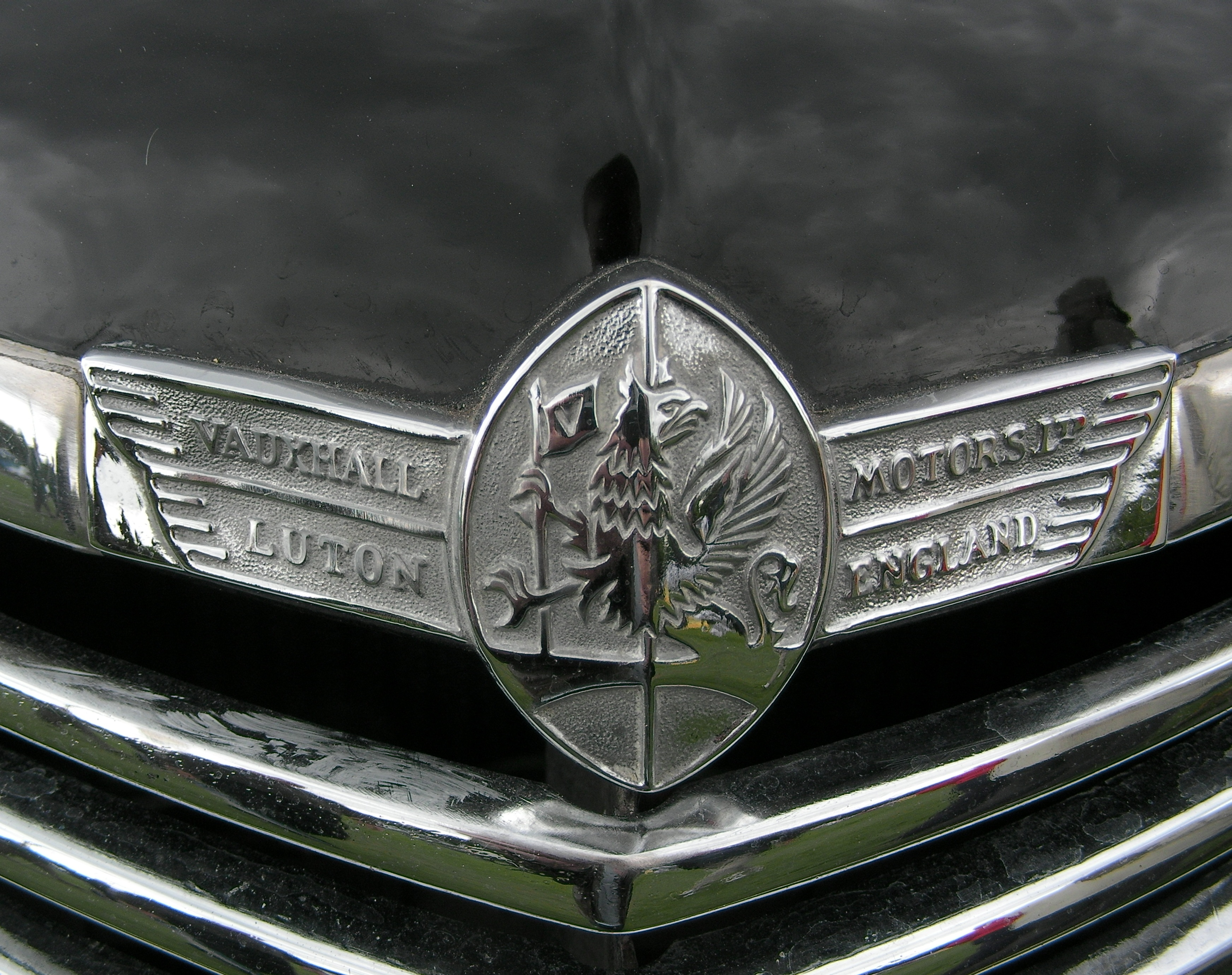
A Vauxhall grillplate from the 1940s showing the Griffin logo

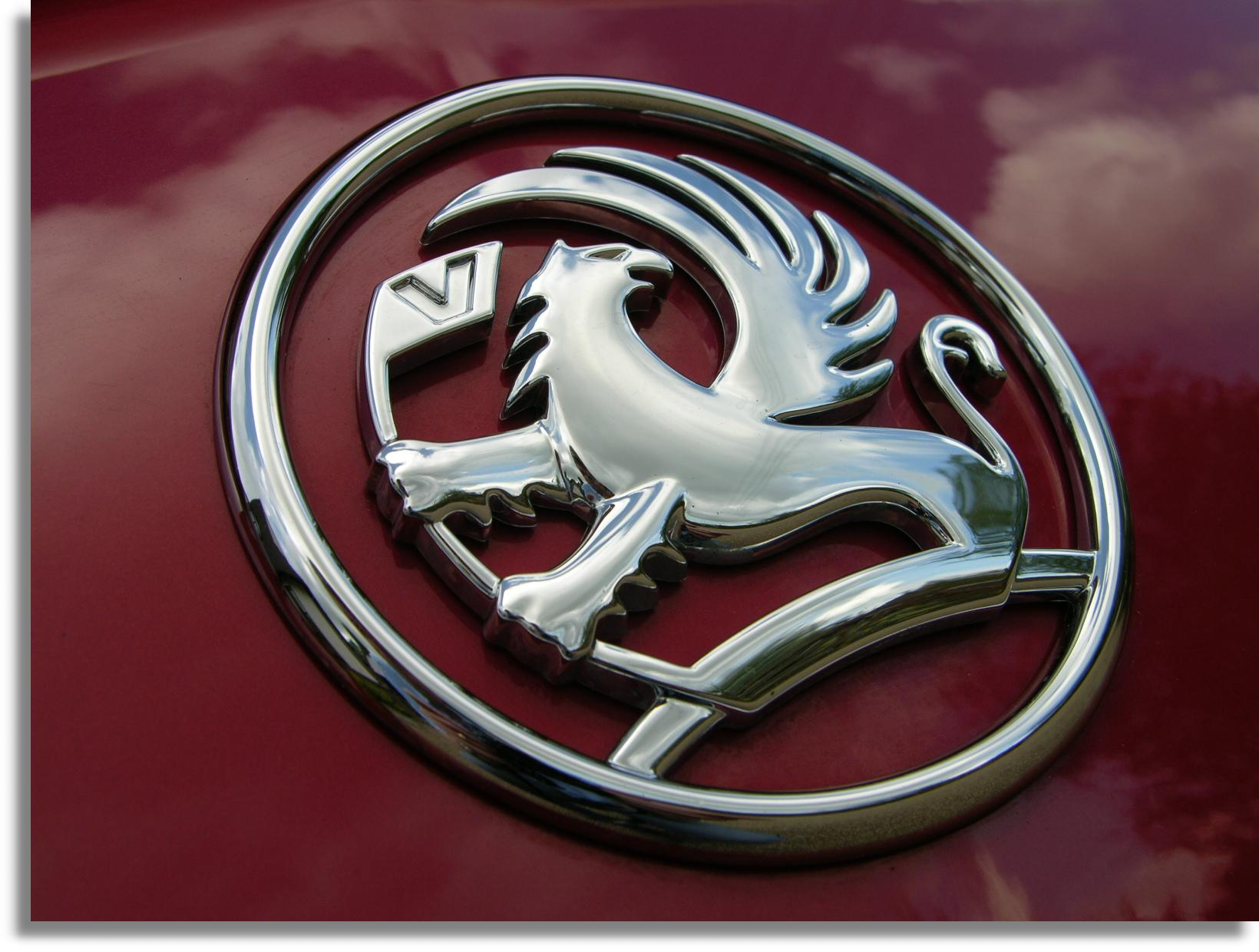
Vauxhall Motors' logo from the 1990s to 2008

== Sponsorships ==
Vauxhall Motors sponsored the Football Conference, the highest non-league division of English football, from 1986 until 1998. It took over from Gola, and remained in association with the league for twelve years, before ending its backing and being replaced by Nationwide Building Society. In 2011, Vauxhall became the primary sponsor for the home nations national football teams (England, Northern Ireland, Scotland and Wales).

== Motorsports ==
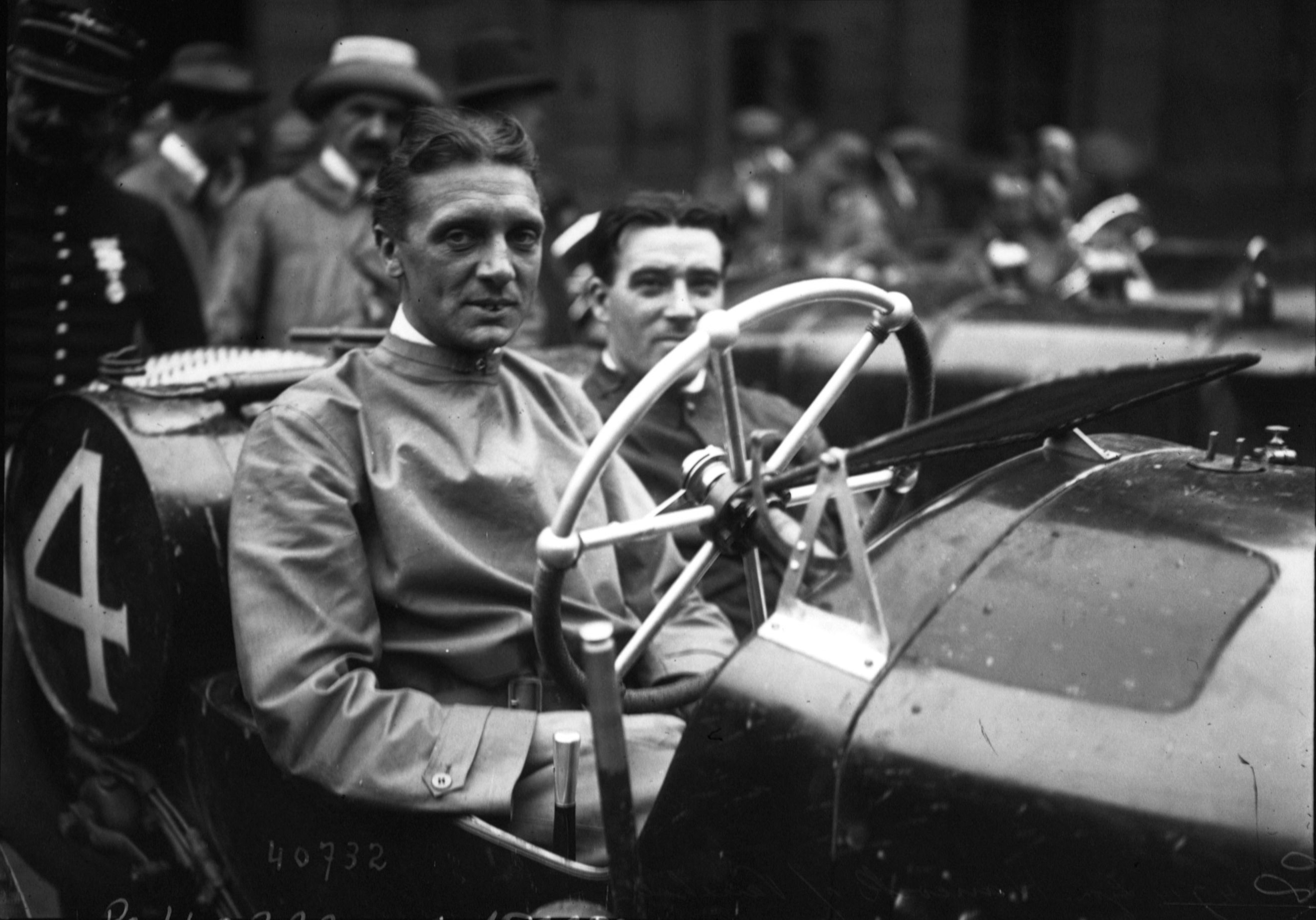
John Hancock driving a Vauxhall at the 1914 French Grand Prix

Vauxhall has competed successfully in several forms of motorsport.

During the 1970s Vauxhall had a strong presence on the British rallying scene. The Magnum coupe was heavier and less powerful than the dominant Ford Escort, but still put up some strong performances in the hands of drivers such as Will Sparrow and Brian Culcheth. From 1976, Vauxhall decided to heighten their profile in the sport by building a homologation-special version of the Vauxhall Chevette, known as the Chevette HS. This was a much more serious contender, and in the hands of drivers such as Pentti Airikkala, Tony Pond, Russell Brookes and Jimmy McRae it and its successor version, the Chevette HSR, won many events in Britain and Europe. Airikkala won the British Rally Championship in a Chevette in 1979.

The Chevette was retired in 1983, and effort was concentrated for the next few years on the Group B Opel Manta 400. However, the Vauxhall Astra and Vauxhall Nova were campaigned in the lower power classes during the mid-1980s, and became popular amateurs' cars thanks to their reliability, ease of tuning and ready supply of parts. After the banning of Group B in 1986 the Group A Astra returned to the forefront. As a two-litre, front-wheel-drive car it was unable to challenge the four-wheel-drive cars for outright victory, but did score top ten placings on several World Championship events. Louise Aitken-Walker won the ladies' World Championship in 1990 in an Astra, despite a serious accident on that year's Rally of Portugal when her car rolled down a hillside and into a lake.

During 1991–92 serious consideration was given to campaigning the four-wheel-drive version of the Vauxhall Calibra in British and possibly world rallies, and a trial version contested the 1993 Swedish Rally in the hands of Stig Blomqvist. However, the cost was judged prohibitive, and in any case the 'Formula 2' category had been introduced into British rallying. The latest version of the Astra was an ideal contender, and won the category in the 1993 and 1994 championships, driven by David Llewellin. Vauxhall campaigned successive versions of the Astra in the British championship until the late 1990s.

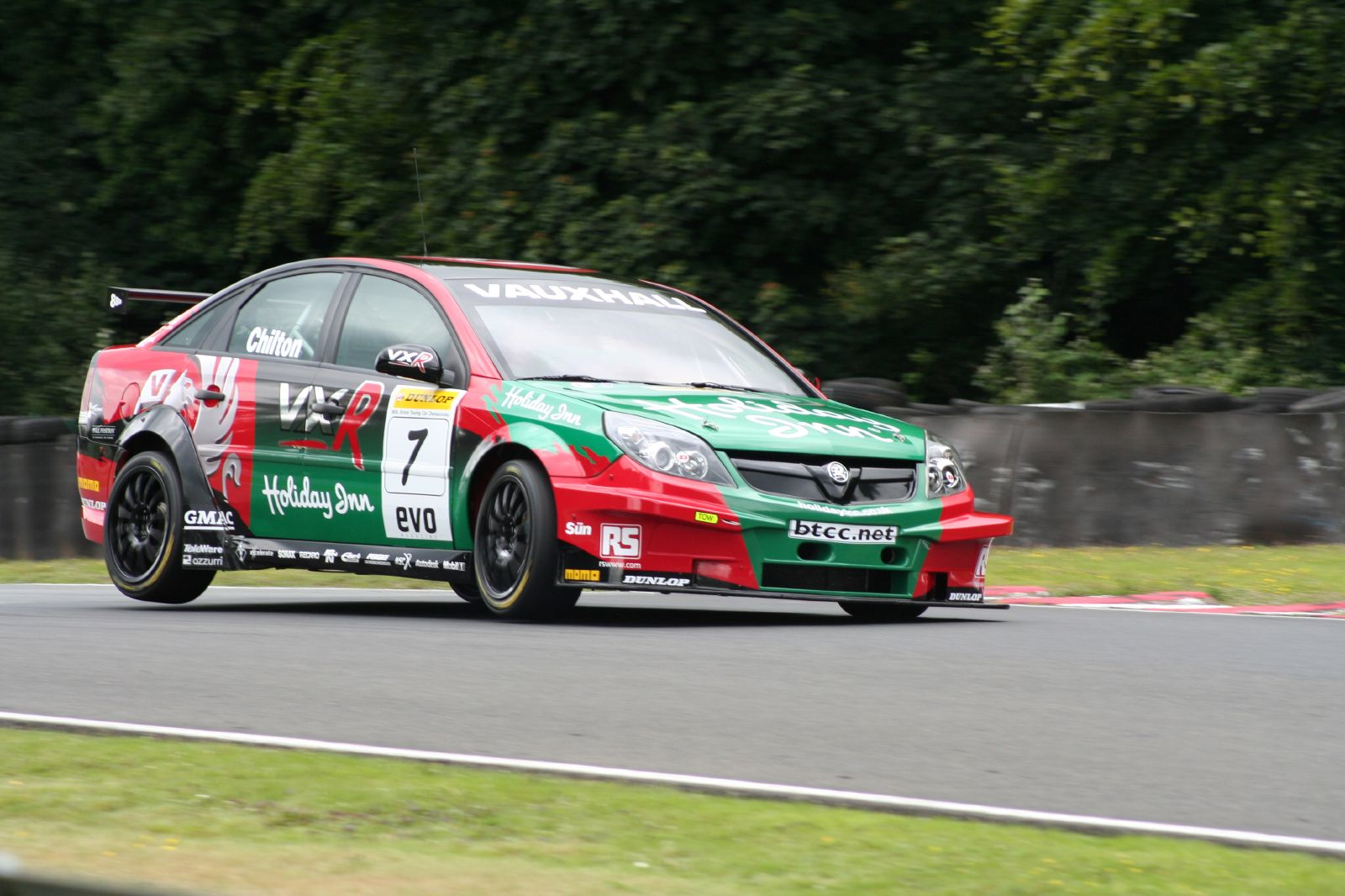
Tom Chilton driving for Vauxhall at the Oulton Park round of the 2007 British Touring Car Championship

Vauxhall first entered the British Touring Car Championship with the Vauxhall Cavalier in 1989. The lead driver was John Cleland, who remained with the team until his retirement in 1999. The Cavalier was competitive, and often the fastest front-wheel-drive car in the series, and Cleland was second in the title race in 1992, and then fourth in the following two years. In 1995, however, he won the title (adding to his 1989 title win in an Astra). The Cavalier was replaced by the Vectra for 1996. Yvan Muller was sixth in the 1999 British Touring Car Championship and fourth in 2000.

In 2001 the BTCC regulations changed and Vauxhall brought the Astra Coupe into the BTCC. The Astra would dominate the BTCC between 2001 and 2004 with the drivers title won by Jason Plato in 2001, James Thompson in 2002–2004 and Yvan Muller in 2003. Vauxhall also won the Manufacturers Award and Teams Award every year also.

In 2005 the Astra Coupe was replaced by the Astra Sport Hatch; however, it was not as competitive as the Astra Coupe and restricted success for Vauxhall in 2005 and 2006.

In 2007 The regulations changed again and Vauxhall brought the Vectra back. The Vectra brought success back to Vauxhall after Fabrizio Giovanardi won the 2007 and 2008 BTCC championship. Fabrizio Giovanardi finished 3rd in the championship in 2009 before Vauxhall pulled sponsorship out at the end of 2009 due to and the economic crisis and lack of official manufacturers in the BTCC.

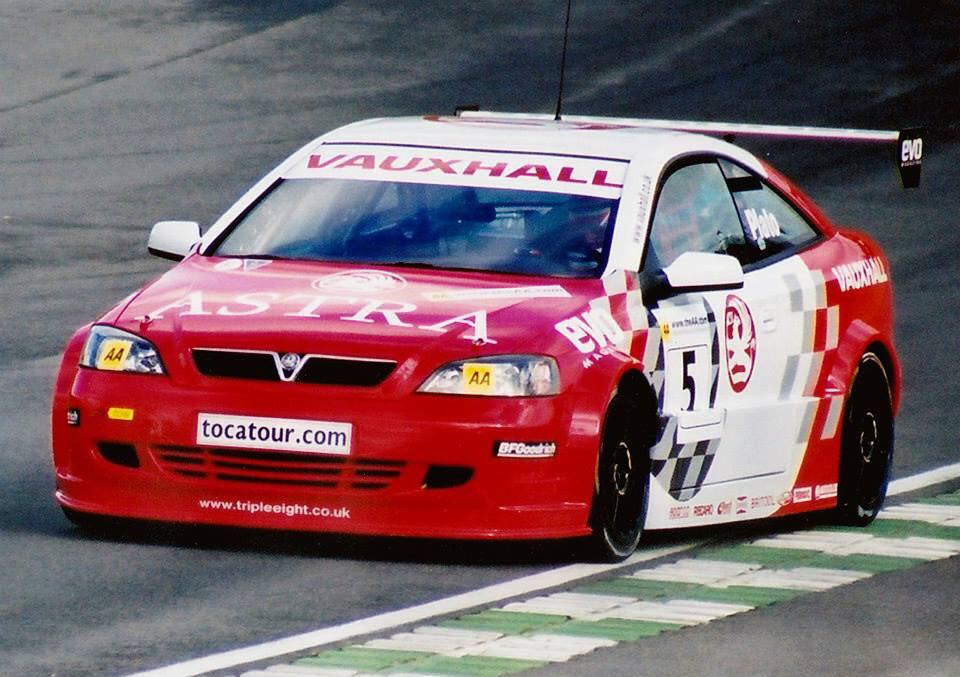
Jason Plato driving a modified Vauxhall Astra in the 2001 British Touring Car Championship

In November 2016 it was announced that Vauxhall would return to the BTCC in partnership with Power Maxed Racing. It was later announced that former BTCC and WTCC driver Tom Chilton would lead the team with Senna Proctor as his teammate. The team earned a podium at their first meeting of the year at Brands Hatch, and their best finish was a 2nd at Silverstone, with Rob Huff standing in for Tom Chilton.

2018 saw the team return as TAG Autosport with Power Maxed Racing, with Senna Proctor this time teaming up with Josh Cook. The first round of the year saw Senna Proctor take both his and the Team's first win at Brands Hatch, as he made an incredible drive from P28 to take the chequered flag. Josh Cook followed at Donington just a few weeks later with a Pole Position and a Lights to Flag victory in the first race, followed by yet another podium in Race 3. Another win followed for Cook at the following round at Thruxton. Throughout the year the team managed another 10 podiums, and dropped no lower than 3rd in the Teams Standings for the entire season. More than 50% of race finishes saw at least 1 driver in the Top 10.

For 2019, the decision was made to run as Sterling Insurance with Power Maxed Racing, with two new drivers; Jason Plato, the most successful driver in British history (by race wins) and former Independents Champion Rob Collard.

== See also ==
- Steinmetz Opel Tuning
- Irmscher
- List of car manufacturers of the United Kingdom
- VinFast
