= Bedford HC =

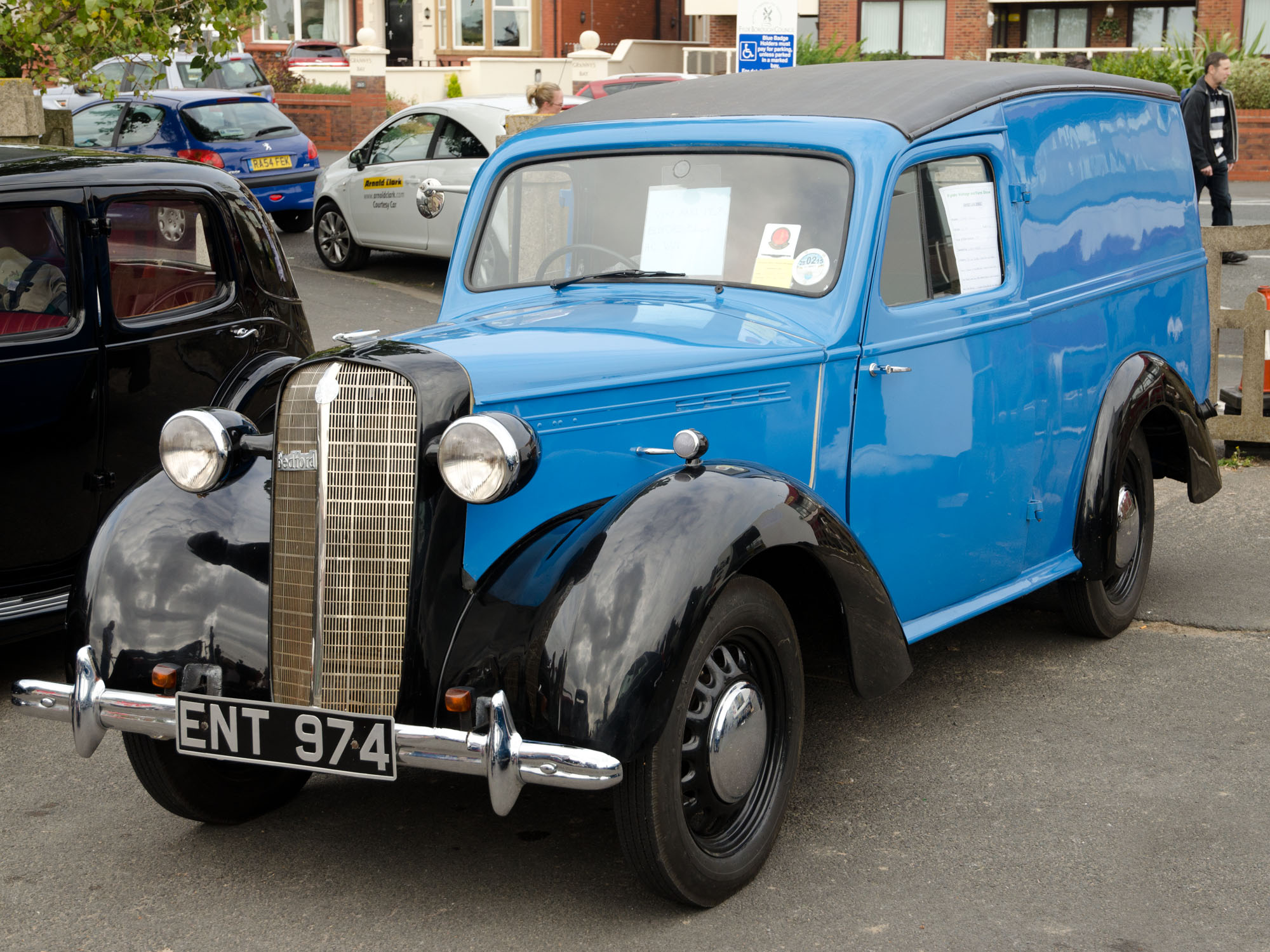
- 1948 Bedford HC Van

Overview
- Manufacturer: Bedford
- Production: 1938-1948 (HC); 1939-1948 (JC); 1948-1952 (PC)

Body and chassis
- Class: Light commercial vehicle
- Body style: 2-door panel van; 2-door Utilevan; 2-door pickup truck/coupé utility
- Layout: FR layout
- Related: Vauxhall 10-4; Vauxhall 12-4; Vauxhall 14-6

Powertrain
- Engine: 1203 cc 10HP OHV I4; 1442 cc 12HP OHV I4

Dimensions
- Wheelbase: 97.75 in (2,483 mm) (HC); 105 in (2,667 mm) (JC/PC)
- Curb weight: 1,991–2,991 lb (903–1,357 kg)

Chronology
- Successor: Bedford HA; Bedford CA

The Bedford HC is a small commercial vehicle that was made by Bedford, beginning in 1938. The vehicle shared its running gear with the H-series Vauxhall 10-4 saloon. Production of civilian vehicles ceased during World War II with the HC van re-entering production for a little while following hostilities. The HC was later joined by the heavier duty Bedford JC, which was itself replaced by the higher-roofed Bedford PC after the war. With the arrival of the much more modern Bedford CA the by now outmoded PC was finally retired.

== Previous Bedford vans ==
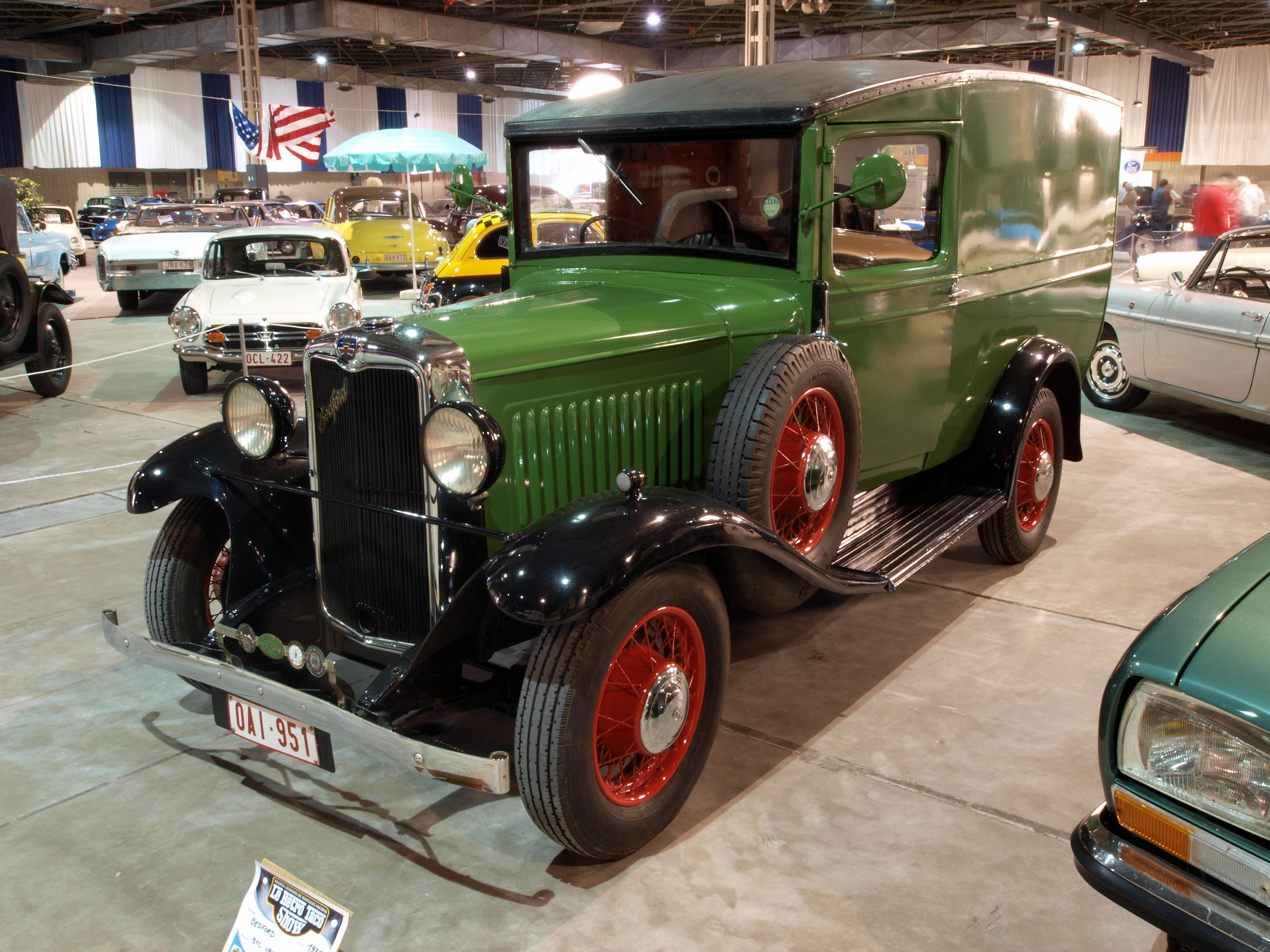
1938 Bedford BYC

In 1932 Bedford produced its first light commercial van, it was marketed on the 12 cwt category and was based on the Vauxhall Cadet passenger car but there were various modifications. The first variant, the Bedford VYC, retained the Cadet's 6-cylinder engine and chassis. Later on, a more powerful engine was used. The 6-cylinder engine used in the Vauxhall Big Six was also an option. The van was later rename the Bedford BYC and remained in production until 1939. Bedford continued to develop its share of the light transport market, with the introduction of the 8 cwt ASYC and ASXC vans, a close derivative of the Vauxhall Light Six car.

Such vehicles were also produced in Australia and New Zealand where they were marketed alongside Chevrolet and GMC trucks, received various locally-built bodies available for specific markets only such as a roadster utility or coupé utility.

The AS series of vans continued in production until 1939.

== Design ==
The HC's original engine was a four-cylinder unit of 1203 cc, which was rated at 34.5 hp (25.7 kW) at the time. In January 1939 a wooden-bodied pickup truck version called the "Utility Wagon" was introduced. Payload was 5 or 6 long hundredweight (560 or 670 lb; 250 or 300 kg). The HC was Bedford's smallest vehicle at the time and after it was discontinued in the autumn of 1948, Bedford stayed out of the segment until the 1964 introduction of the Bedford HA.

Production was suspended in 1940 as World War II began in earnest. While Bedford began building their heavier trucks in 1945, the lighter HC and JC models had to wait until 1946. Beginning in late 1946 HCs received a 1442 cc version of the engine as seen in the Vauxhall 12-4 and the heavier JC, developing 35 hp. The HC was discontinued in September 1948; 10,600 Bedford HC were built in total. While the pickup version was not listed after the war, Bedford did offer the interesting "Utilevan" version. This was a glazed four-seater Estate Wagon version of the van with a folding rear seat. The Utilevan was an officially sanctioned conversion by independent coachbuilder Martin Walter, Ltd., who later built the Bedford Beagle.

From mid-1938, the HC was also assembled in Australia where it was marketed as the Bedford 6cwt Carryall. A panel van with lower roof and rounded front doors was available, as were three different coupé utilities: an open delivery, a wellside delivery, and a flareboard delivery. The engine was unchanged from the British market. The range of bodystyles was later increased to seven, including a roadster utility (a pickup without a roof).

== Bedford JC ==
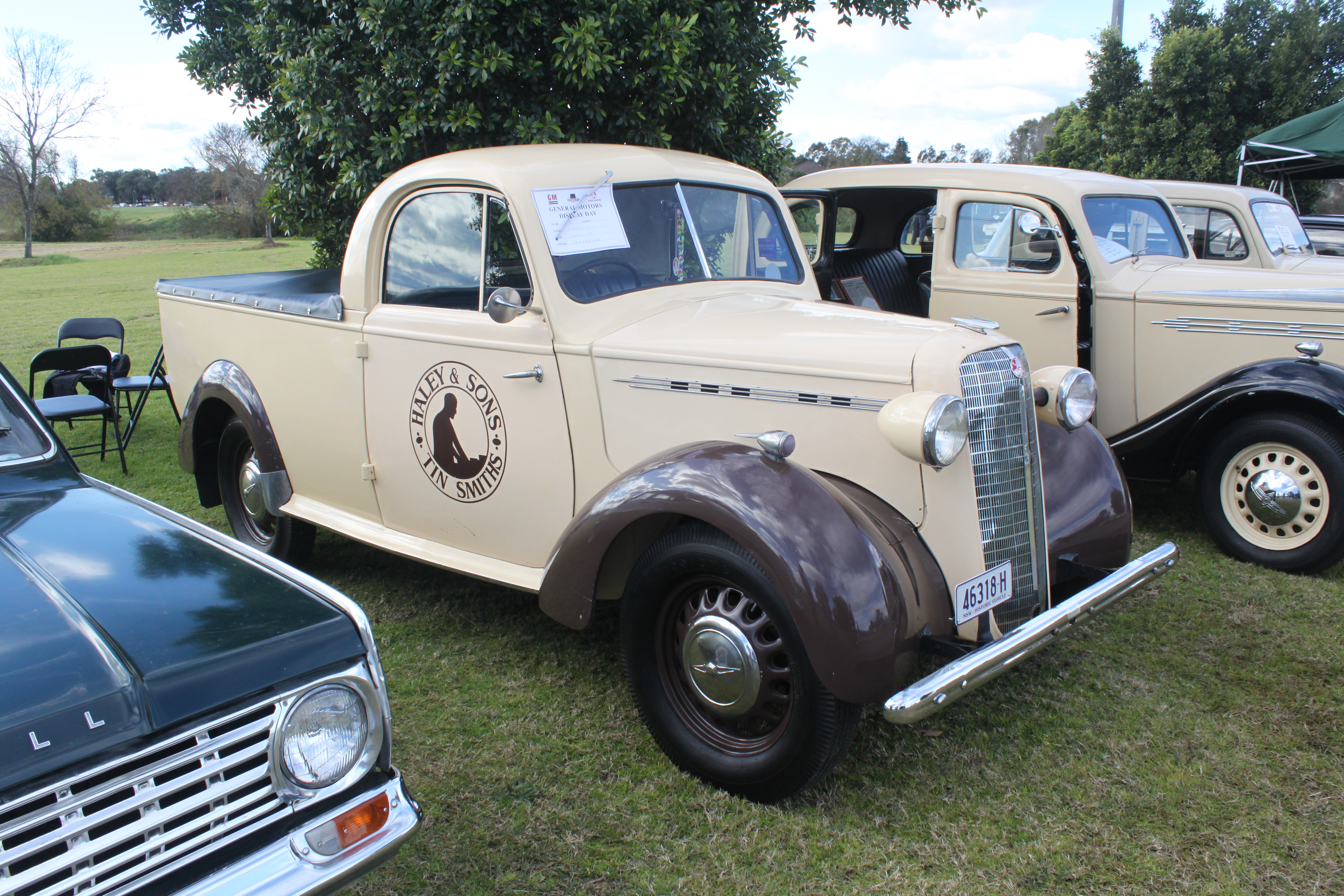
1940 Bedford JC Coupé Utility (Australia)

The heavier duty JC joined the HC in June 1939. The visual differences between the HC and JC vans are a higher roofline and longer 105-inch (2,700 mm) wheelbase. The JC received the 1.4-litre "12HP" engine as used in the Vauxhall 12-4 and post-war HCs. The JC's payload is 10 or 12 long hundredweight (1,100 or 1,300 lb; 510 or 610 kg). The JC was built from 1939 until 1940 and again between 1946 and 1948. As with the HC, there was also a 'Utilevan' variant on offer, a carryall version of the van with two folding rear seats and a maximum capacity of seven people.

From the end of 1939, the 10 hp JC was also built by Holden in Australia, in seven different bodystyles. Variations of the Coupé Utility were the most common model, with panel vans also available. Maximum power of the JC's engine was 40 hp (30 kW). The JC's chassis was also used for the six-cylinder Vauxhall Model J 14hp passenger car range. Australian built JCs (and 14s) have split windshields, a detail that continued on the succeeding PC model as the smaller panes were cheaper and easier to replace given Australia's gravel roads.

== Bedford PC ==
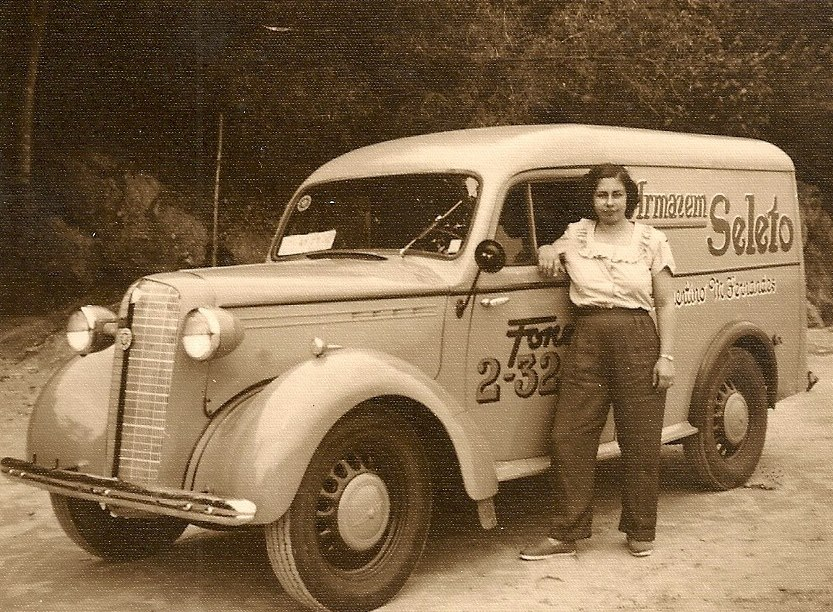
1950 Bedford PC Van exported to Brazil

In mid-1948 the JC was updated with a column shifted three-speed transmission and 12-volt electrics, which also meant a name change to Bedford PC. The engine and overall appearance remained as before.

The PC was also assembled by Holden in Australia from parts shipped from England. The bodywork behind the cowl was built in Australia and was very different from British models, with different doors with rounded tops and a much lower roofline. Holden offered four bodystyles of their own design: a plain cowl and chassis (PC 6100), an open Coupé Utility (PC 6106), a Wellside Coupé Utility (PC 6108), and the Panel Van (PC 6104).
