= Vauxhall 12 =

Vauxhall Motors used the 12 name for two different cars in the 1930s.

- Vauxhall Light Six
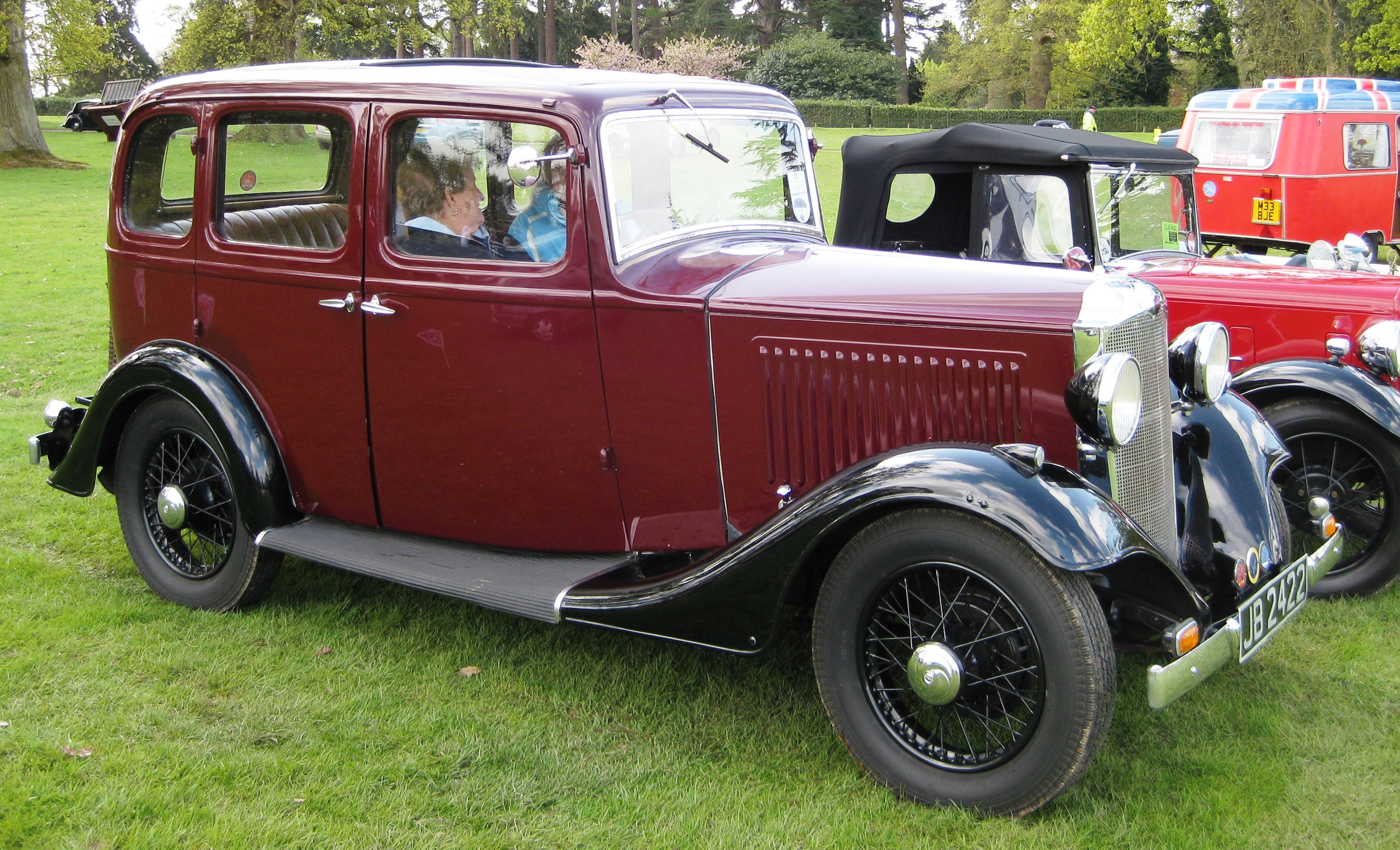
  1933 Vauxhall Light Six ASY type
  The 1933 Light Six was available in two engine sizes, 12 hp and 14 hp. It was updated for the 1936 Motor Show with a rounded grille.
- Vauxhall 12-4
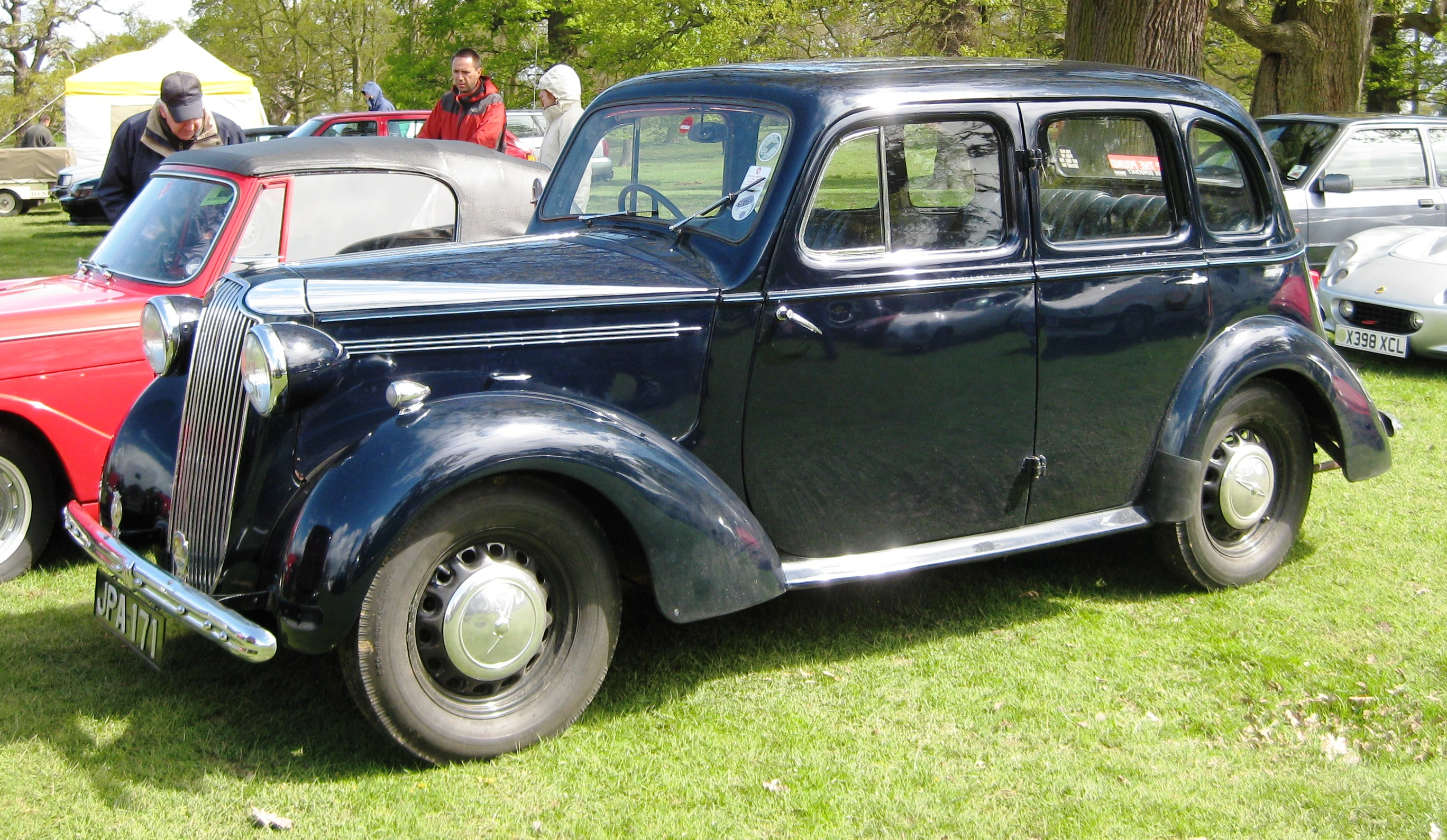
  1939 Vauxhall 12-4 I Type
  A total redesign introduced in September 1938 and given the 12-4 name, the new model featured a longer six-light body based on the Vauxhall 10 and a 4-cylinder 1.4-litre engine
