= Vauxhall 14-6 =

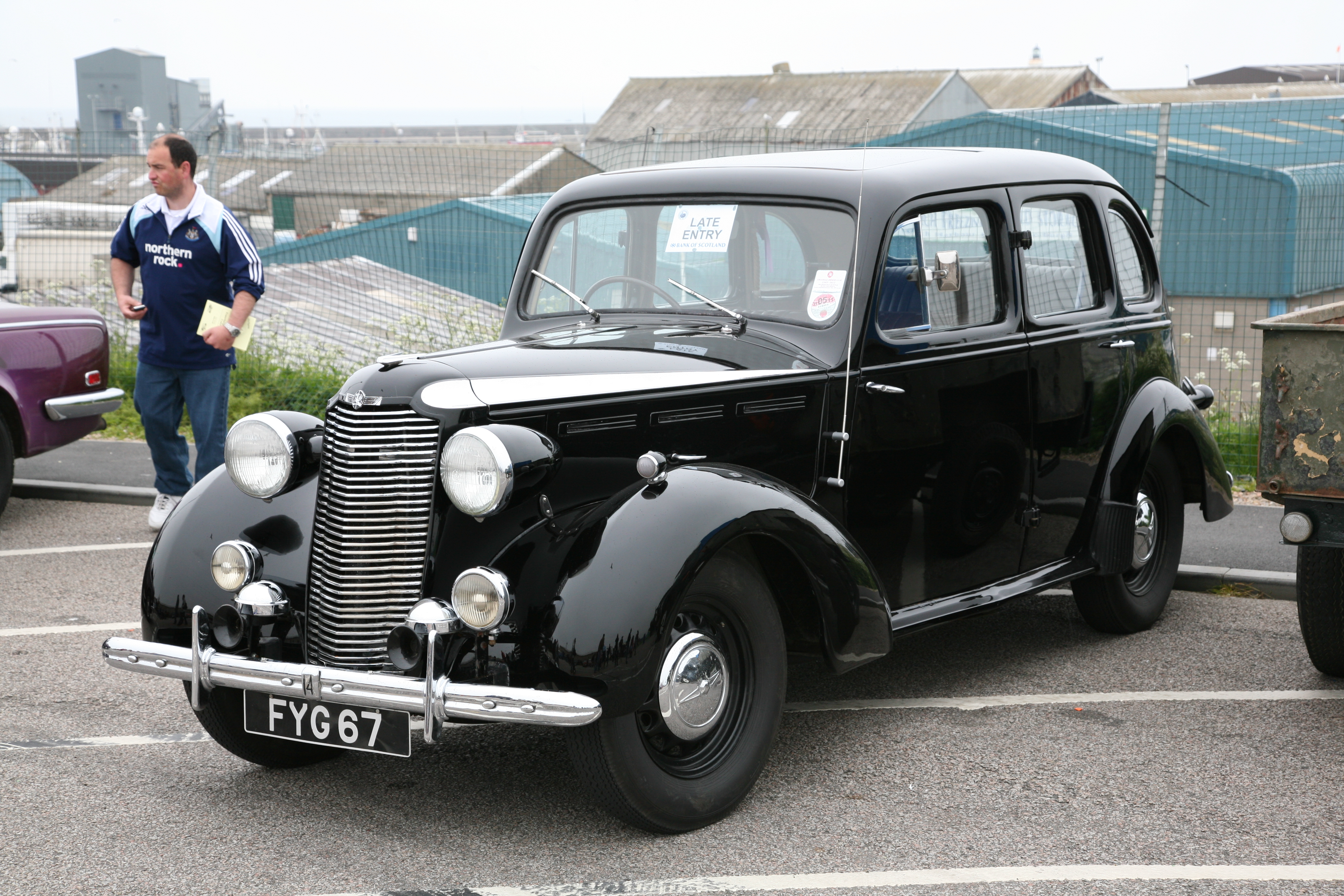
- 1947 Vauxhall Fourteen-Six (unitary hulled six-light saloon, 1938-1948)

Overview
- Manufacturer: Vauxhall
- Also called: Vauxhall Fourteen-Six; Vauxhall Model J
- Production: 1939 to 1948
- Assembly: England; Australia

Body and chassis
- Body style: 4-door saloon 2-door coupé (Australia); 2-door roadster (Australia); 2-door coupé utility (Australia); 2-door roadster utility (Australia)
- Layout: FR layout
- Related: Bedford JC

Powertrain
- Engine: 1,781 cc OHV I6

Dimensions
- Wheelbase: 105 in (2,667 mm)
- Length: 168 in (4,267 mm)
- Width: 63.5 in (1,613 mm)
- Curb weight: 22.5 long cwt (2,520 lb; 1,143 kg)

Chronology
- Predecessor: Vauxhall Light Six
- Successor: Vauxhall Velox

The Vauxhall 14-6 is an automobile produced by Vauxhall in England from 1939 until 1948.

Announced in October 1938 for the 1938 British International Motor Show at Earls Court, the 14-6 was offered as a six-light, four door saloon and was powered by a four bearing, OHV, 1,781 cc straight-six engine. It had a top speed of 70 mph and could accelerate from 0-50 mph in 18.2 seconds.

== Engine, transmission and suspension ==
The previous engine was retained but with compression ratio raised from 6.25 to 6.75:1 and revised timing increasing the output to 48 bhp at 3000rpm. Other features included independent front suspension using torsion bars in place of the previous Dubonnet system with semi-elliptic leaf springs at the rear, Lockheed hydraulic brakes and a three-speed all-synchromesh gearbox in place of the four-speed "silent third" gearbox.

== Unitary chassis-body ==
The car now had a unitary hull which had a 4 in (100 mm) longer wheelbase and 1 in (25 mm) wider track than its predecessor which made it larger than the 12-4 model announced at the same time. Previously the 12 and 14 hp models had shared the same body. Interior features included individual leather front seats and a rear seat with fold-down arm rest, a rear window blind and a sliding sunroof.

Post World War II models can be distinguished by bonnet-louvre and grille changes. A total of 45,499 were produced, including 30,511 in the post war period.

== Australian production ==
A Vauxhall 14 J was built by Holden in Australia without unitary construction which was beyond the capacity of local presses but sharing much of the English car's styling. The separate chassis allowed the Australian firm to provide open and utility bodies. Commencing in 1939, the 14 was offered in sedan, coupé and roadster body-styles. and as in England but in a Holden version, a light utility.

A 14 sedan was the first civilian car to be produced by Holden in the post war period, leaving the Fishermans Bend assembly line on 21 May 1946.

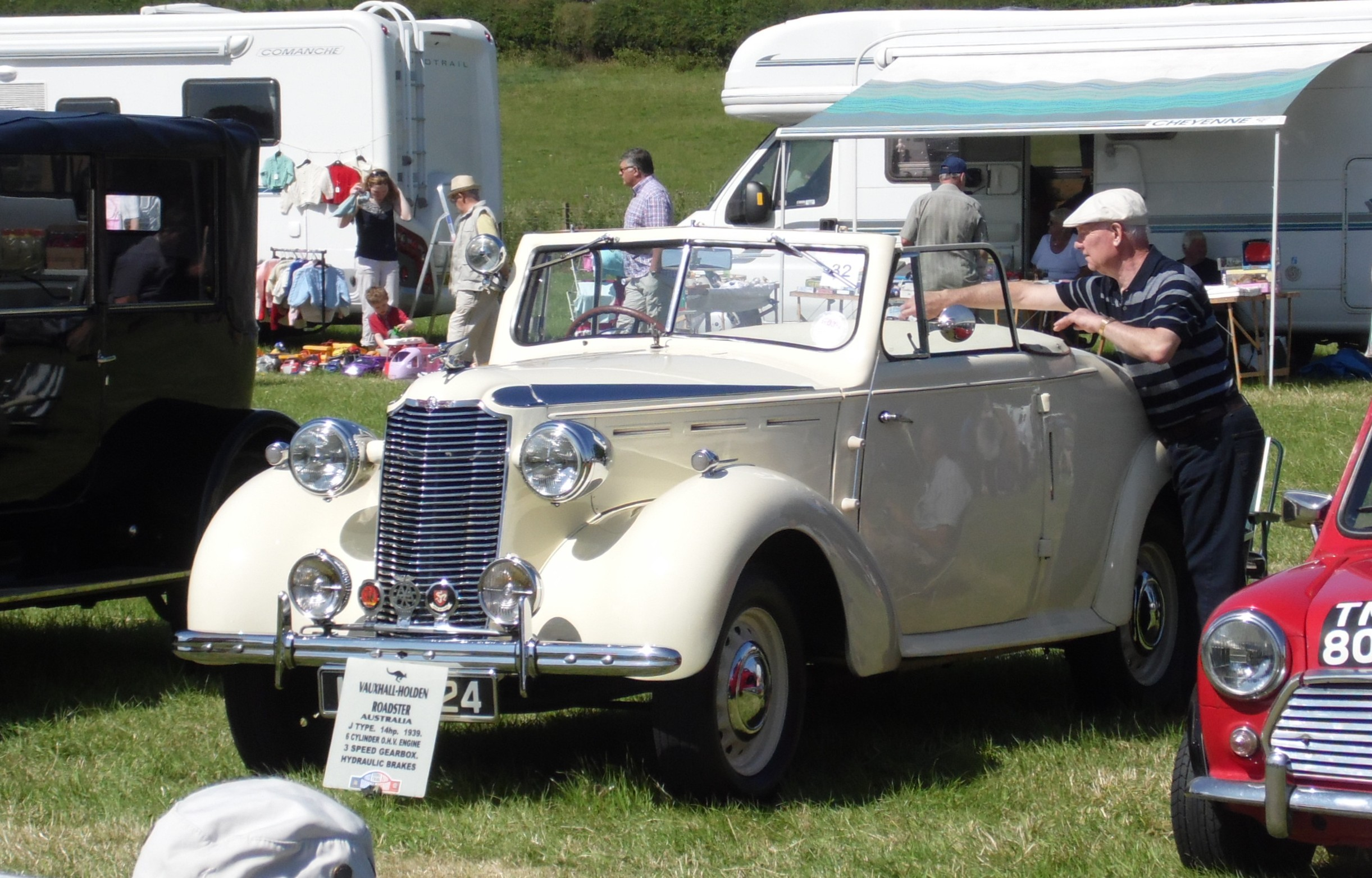
Vauxhall drophead coupé 1939

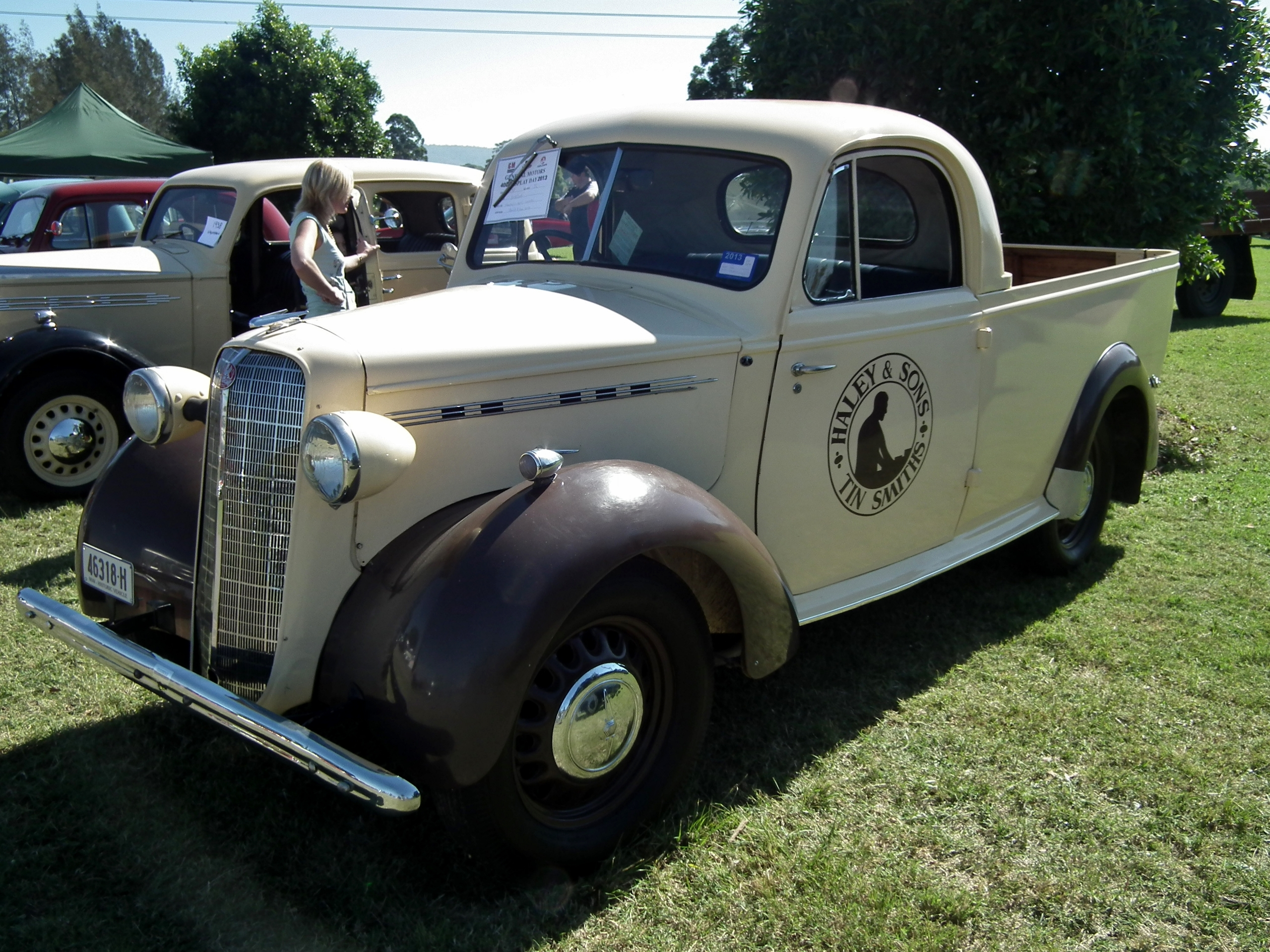
Bedford Business Roadster or coupé utility 1940

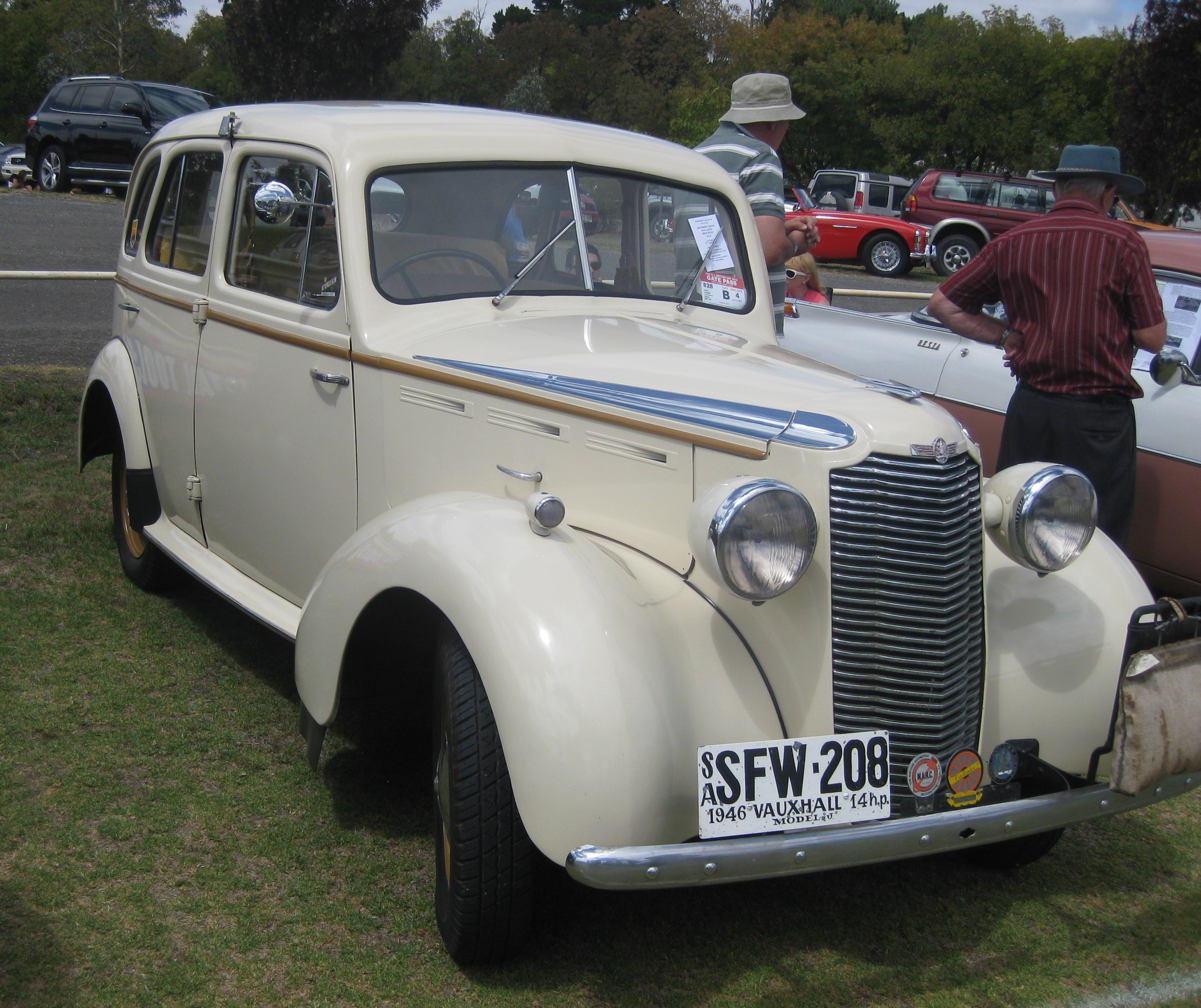
Vauxhall 14 Model J 1946
note Holden's divided windscreen and roof
