= Bedford CA =

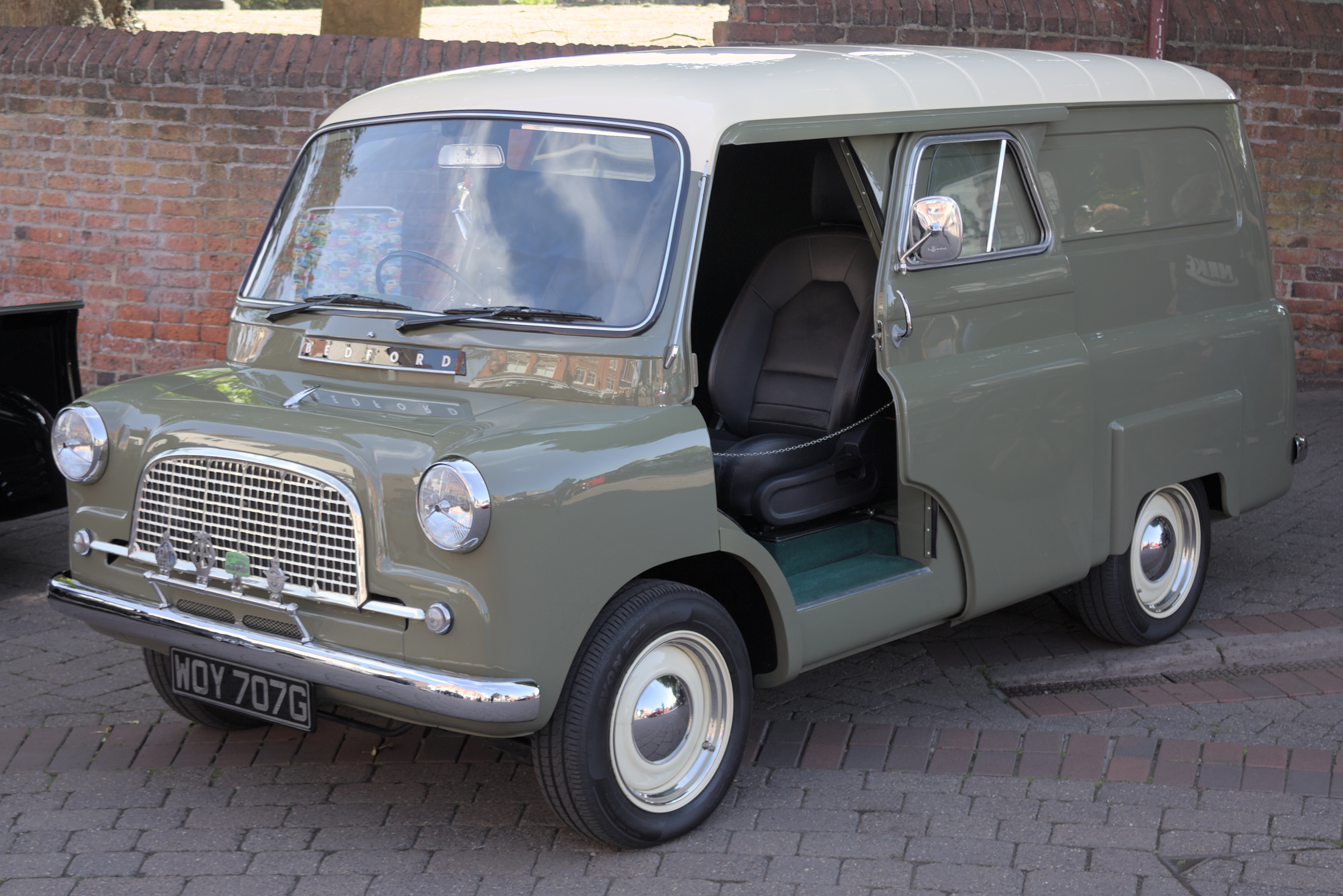

Overview
- Manufacturer: Bedford
- Also called: Envoy
- Production: 1952–1969
- Assembly: Luton, England

Body and chassis
- Class: Light commercial vehicle
- Body style: Van
- Layout: Longitudinal front engine, rear-wheel drive
- Related: Bedford Dormobile

Powertrain
- Engine: 1.5 L I4 OHV, 1.6 L I4 OHV
- Transmission: 3-speed manual, 4-speed manual

Dimensions
- Wheelbase: SWB: 90 in (2,286 mm); LWB: 102 in (2,591 mm)
- Length: SWB: 154 in (3,912 mm); LWB: 166 in (4,216 mm)
- Width: 70.0 in (1,778 mm)
- Height: 74.75 in (1,899 mm)
- Kerb weight: SWB: 2,245 lb (1,018 kg); LWB: 2,345 lb (1,064 kg)

Chronology
- Predecessor: Bedford PC
- Successor: Bedford CF

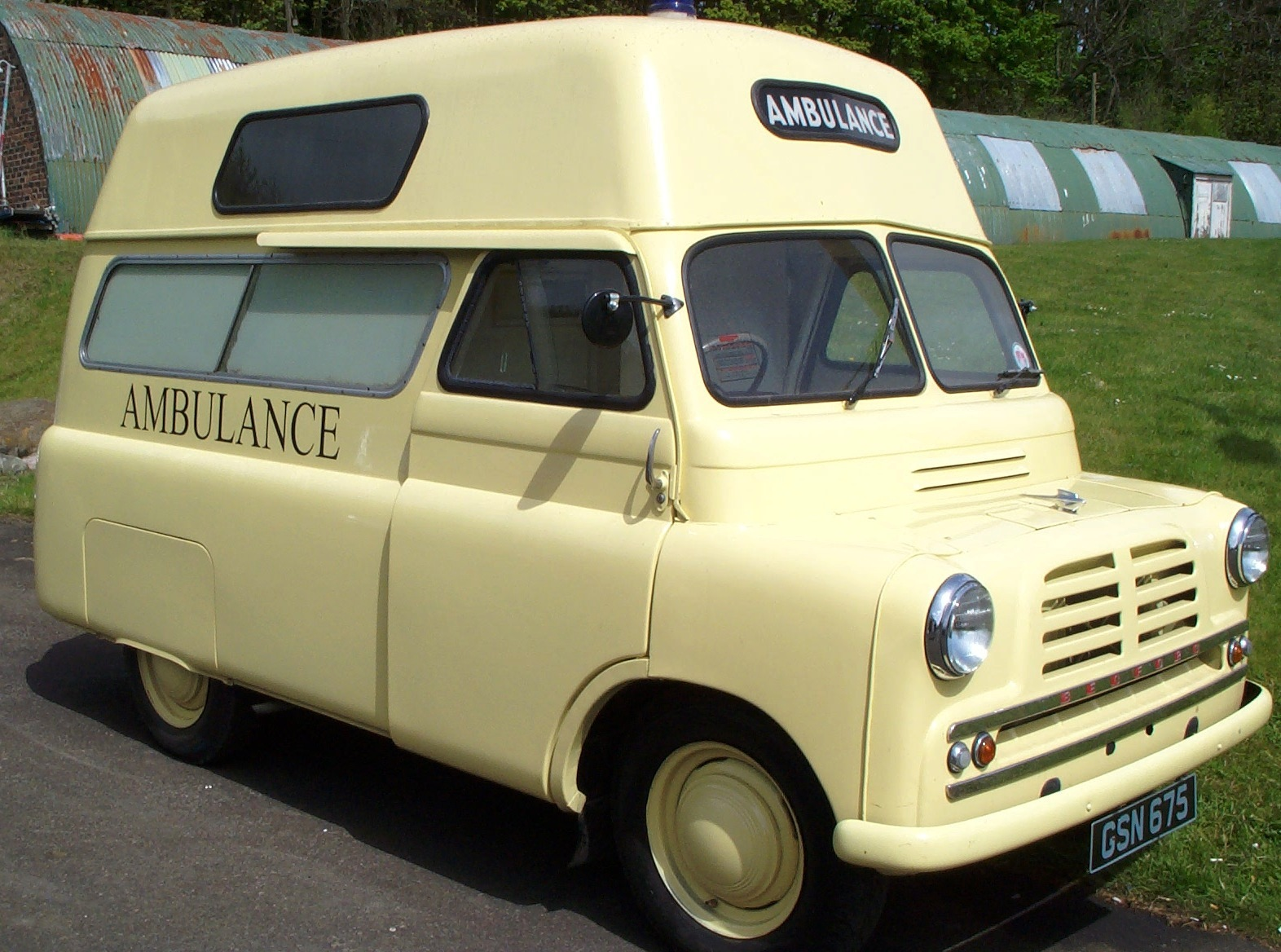
Bedford CA ambulance. Curved windscreens were expensive in the early 1950s, and until 1958 the CA used a "split-screen" windscreen.

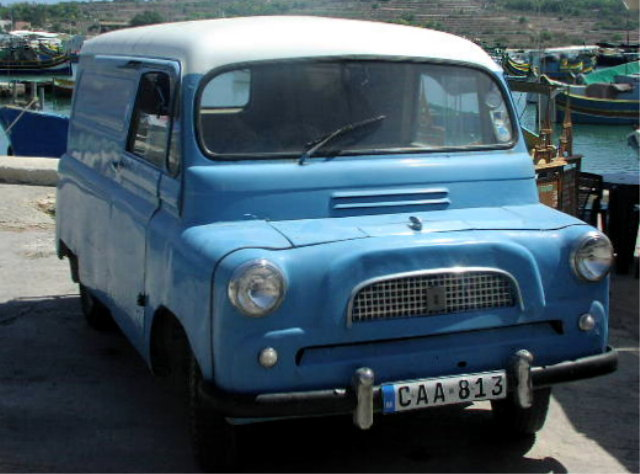
Bedford CA panel van

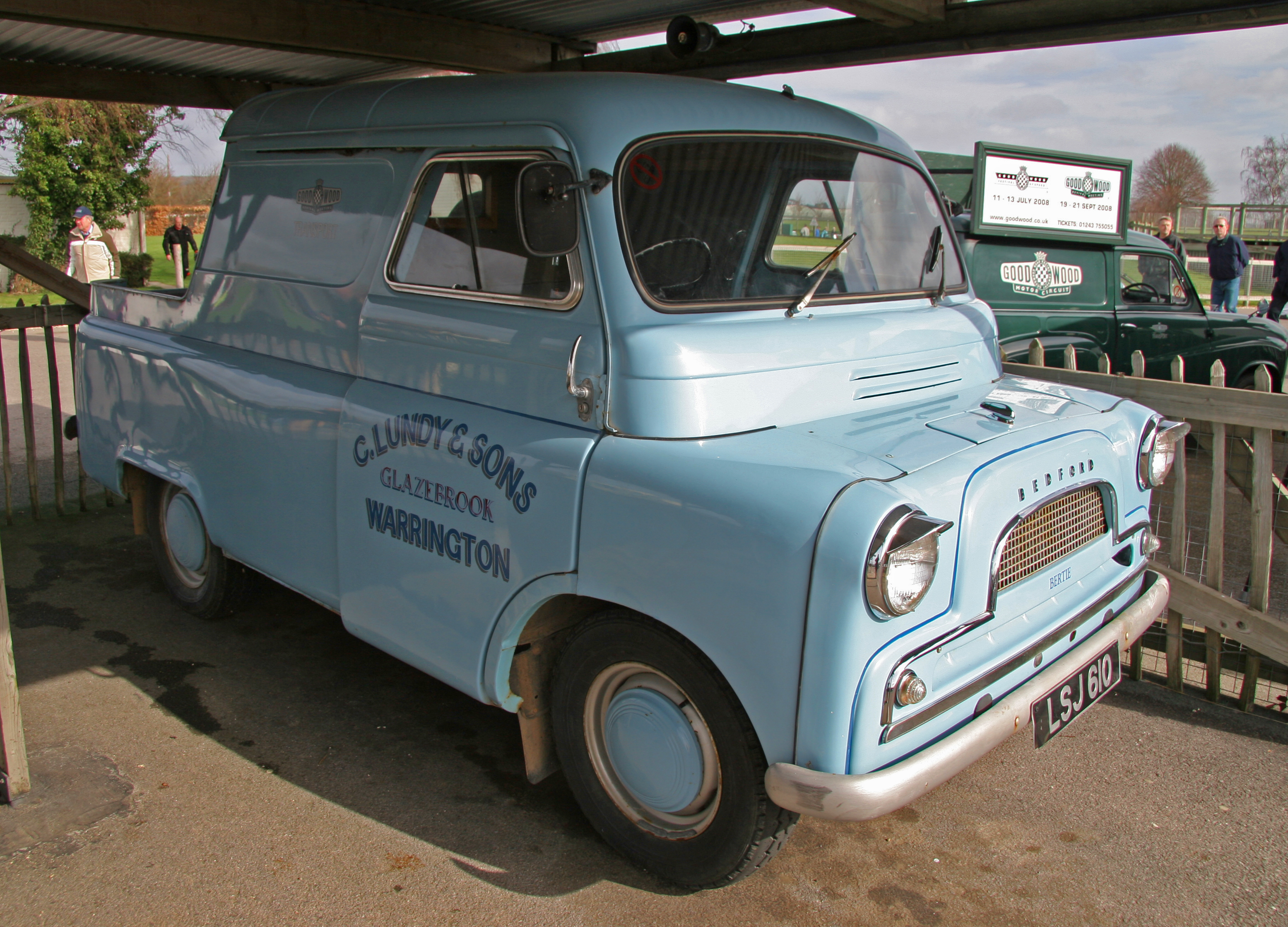
Bedford CA pickup

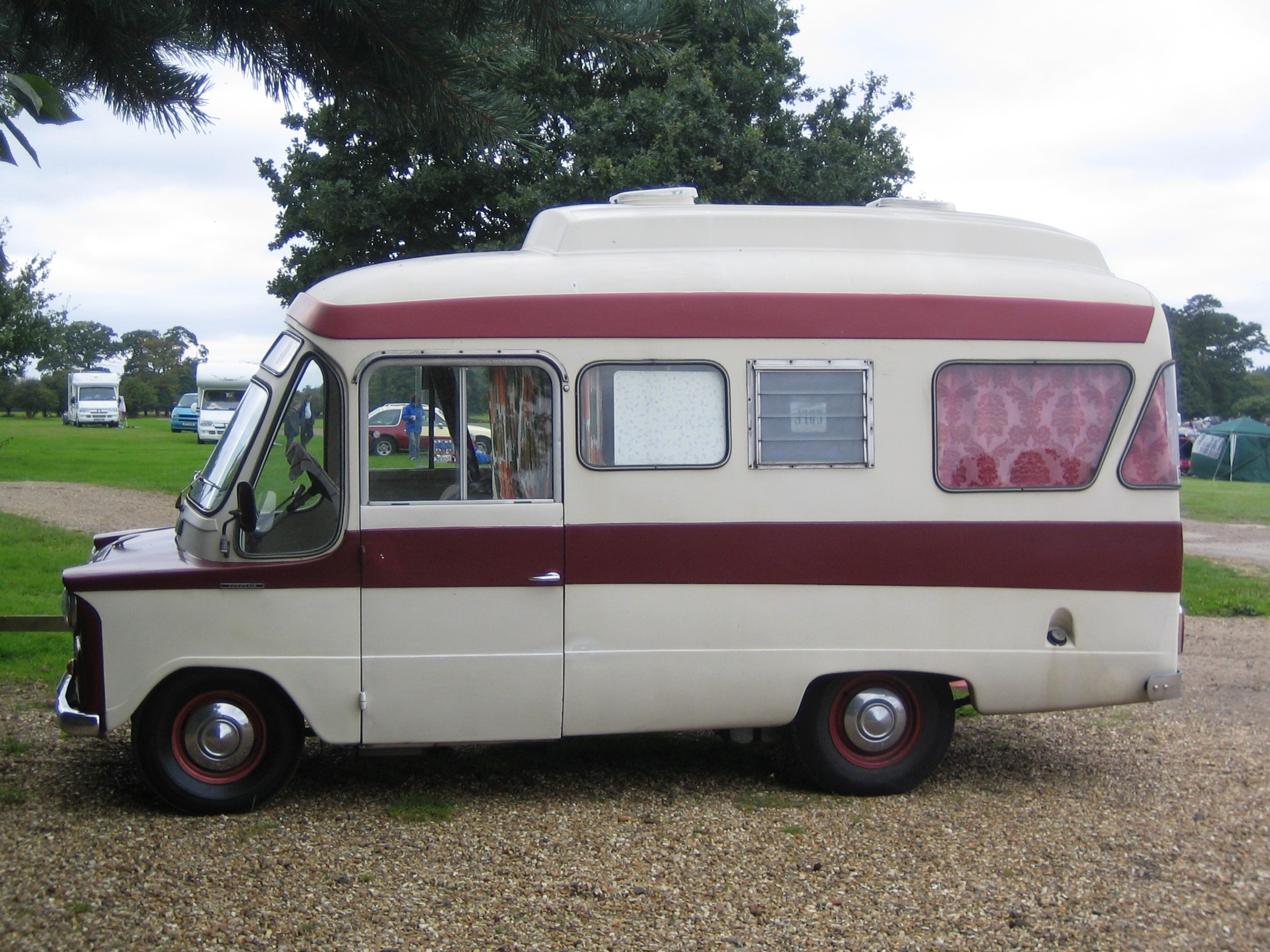
As the 1960s progressed, the Bedford CA chassis found itself used as the basis for an increasingly flamboyant succession of motor homes such as this 1965 Dormobile Debonaire. The front windscreen is shared with the standard van along with the mechanical components.

The Bedford CA was a distinctive pug-nosed light commercial vehicle produced between 1952 and 1969 by Bedford in Luton, England.

It was manufactured in short-wheelbase and long-wheelbase forms, each form available in either a 10–12 cwt or a 15 cwt version.

Generally it was supplied as a light delivery van with sliding doors, but it was also available as a chassis with cowl upon which specialist bodywork could be added. The Bedford Dormobile was a Campervan conversion based on the Bedford CA van.

The CA was also exported to Canada and sold as the Envoy CA, as part of the Envoy brand line-up. In its 17 year production run 370,000 were manufactured.

== Dimensions ==
	details	
overall width	70.0 inches (1,778 mm)	
overall height (unladen)	74.75 inches (1,899 mm)	
axle track	53.25 inches (1,353 mm) (front)	54.5 inches (1,384 mm) (rear)
	short wheelbase	long wheelbase
wheelbase	90 inches (2,286 mm)	102 inches (2,591 mm)
overall length	154 inches (3,912 mm)	166 inches (4,216 mm)
kerb weight	2,245 pounds (1,018 kg)	2,345 pounds (1,064 kg)
turning circle	34 feet (10.4 m)	37 feet (11.3 m)

== Body ==
The overall profile and architecture of the CA changed little during the vehicle's seventeen-year life. There were, however, three distinctly different versions sold. The first CAs featured a two-piece windscreen, comprising two separate flat sheets of glass separated with a central vertical metal divide. As curved screen glass became available in the UK at an acceptable price, the two piece windscreen was replaced with a single slightly curved windscreen in approximately 1958. At the same time the painted front grille of the original, which had featured a central split reflecting the split windscreen, was replaced by a smaller unsplit front grille, still painted in the van's body colour. The third version of the Bedford CA, sold from late 1964, featured a much deeper windscreen and side windows, and a corresponding reduction in the height of the painted metal scuttle panel directly below the windscreen. The 1964 vans also reflected general trends in car design of the time in featuring, for the first time, a pressed aluminium alloy front grille. The longer wheelbase version had the body lengthened by an additional short roof panel, with wider doors.

== Powertrain ==
The CA utilised a contemporary powertrain layout. This consisted of a front-mounted longitudinally-oriented internal combustion engine, and rear-wheel drive. The 3-speed gearbox was mounted immediately behind the engine, and torque was transmitted to a live rear axle via an open tubular prop shaft.

The engine and three-speed gearbox were also used in the Vauxhall F-series Victor. The four-speed gearbox from later FC-series models could be easily retro-fitted to any three-speed Bedford CA, and later was offered as a factory option.

=== Engine ===
The vehicle was powered by an inline four cylinder petrol engine of 1508cc at first with pushrod operated overhead valves and a three-main bearing crankshaft. The fuel pump, oil pump and distributor were driven directly off the camshaft. A Zenith 34VN downdraught carburetter was fitted. The engine was available in either a low compression or a (less frequently specified) high compression version. Later models also benefitted from the slightly larger 1,594 cubic centimetres (97.3 cu in) engine, as fitted in the Vauxhall Victor FB post 1964. A 1622 cc (99 cu.in) Perkins diesel engine was also available, as was the Perkins 1760 cc (108 cu.in) diesel engine.

The engine extended back into the vehicle's passenger compartment, and was covered by a removable cowling. The vehicle thus had a very short bonnet, giving it its distinctive look. This configuration meant that the driver and passenger were travelling with their feet alongside the engine, but allowed a good proportion of the vehicle's overall length to be used for its payload. Access to the engine for routine checks was via the tiny bonnet flap, or through the interior cowl. For major overhaul of the engine, the front panel containing the headlights and grille, and the chassis front crossmember had to be completely removed. A popular aftermarket conversion of the time was the use of the Perkins 4/99 diesel engine. This was low on power (40 bhp) but was capable of superior fuel economy.

	details	
engine configuration	inline four overhead valve petrol engine	
engine displacement	1,508 cubic centimetres (92.0 cu in)	
cylinder bore	3.126 inches (79.4 mm)	
piston stroke	3.000 inches (76.2 mm)	
	low compression	high compression
compression ratio	6.8:1	7.8:1
max. motive power	52.0 bhp (38.8 kW) @ 4,000 rpm	54.8 bhp (40.9 kW) @ 4,200 rpm
max. torque	81.7 lbf⋅ft (111 N⋅m) @ 2,400 rpm	84.5 lbf⋅ft (115 N⋅m) @ 2,400 rpm

=== Transmission and final drive ===
The vehicle initially had a three-speed manual transmission driving the rear roadwheels via a semi-floating live rear axle. Later models were offered with the option of a four speed transmission, which introduced an intermediate third gear to ease hill-climbing, although the top gear ratio remained the same as the three-speed gearbox.

== Suspension and steering ==
=== Front suspension ===
The front suspension comprised double wishbones and coil springs attached to a front axle crossmember. An anti-roll bar linked the two lower wishbones.

=== Rear suspension ===
The rear suspension comprised semi-elliptic leaf springs, 2.25 inches (57 mm) wide, mounted on the chassis and shackled to the rear axle. The 10–12 cwt version had seven leaves, and the 15–17 cwt version had eight leaves. Each leaf was 0.25 inches (6.4 mm) thick.

=== Steering system ===
Steering was effected by a Burman worm and nut type steering gear, a four rod linkage system and two relay levers. Despite all of the linkages involved, in practice the system was reasonably precise, and a CA actually handled better than the early Ford Transit thanks to the independent front suspension.

== Operating controls and instruments ==
The gear change was mounted on the steering column. The direction indicator switch was mounted in the instrument panel. The headlamp dip switch was foot operated. The starter switch was push-operated and mounted on the floor panel below the handbrake.

Instruments were limited to a speedometer, a fuel gauge and a water temperature gauge.

The Bedford CA was designed in an era when semi-conductor devices were state-of-the-art, and not affordable for automotive applications. Water temperature was thus measured mechanically, via a capillary tube connected to capsule containing a volatile liquid. The capsule was screwed into the body of the water pump. As the engine coolant temperature increases, the volatile liquid expands, altering the pressure on a mechanical linkage in the water temperature gauge, which moves the position of the needle. Later models used an electric gauge.

The fuel gauge was electrically controlled, as is the case in vehicles today. The sensor unit in the fuel tank could use the electrical resistance of a float-variable rheostat to measure the level of fuel, and was therefore not dependent upon the new semi-conductor technology.

== Braking system ==
The braking system comprised a cast-iron detachable brake drum on each roadwheel, with the retardation provided by asbestos-lined brake shoes mounted in a Twin-leading arrangement at the front wheels and leading/trailing at the back. The shoes were operated by double-acting Lockheed hydraulic cylinders, fed by a single hydraulic circuit connected to the brake master cylinder, which was mechanically linked to the brake pedal. This design was normal for that time.
