= Vauxhall Wyvern =

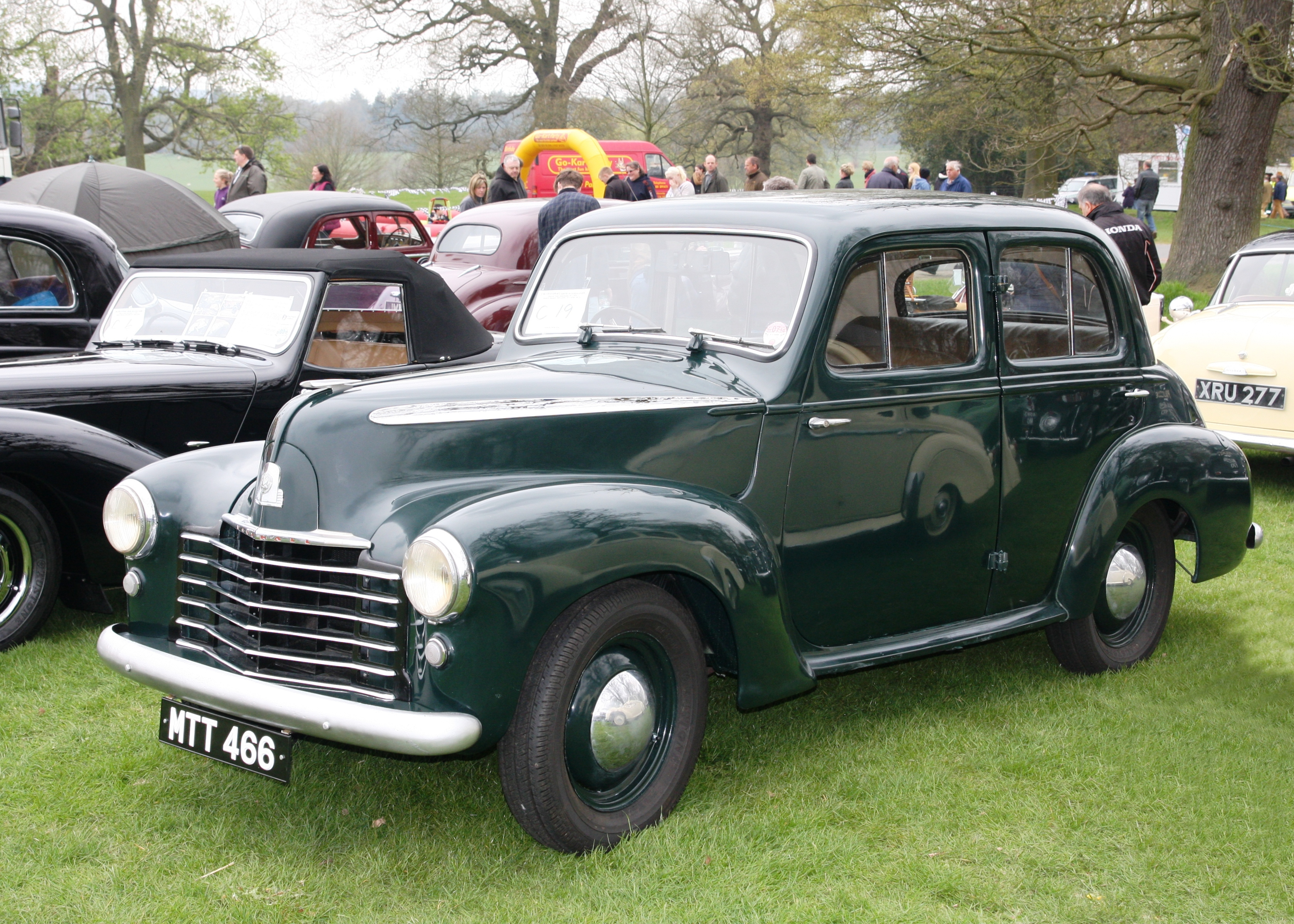
- Vauxhall Wyvern Saloon (LIX)

Overview
- Manufacturer: Vauxhall (General Motors)
- Production: 1948–1957
- Assembly: Luton, United Kingdom; Australia

Body and chassis
- Related: Vauxhall Velox; Vauxhall Cresta

Chronology
- Predecessor: Vauxhall 12-4
- Successor: Vauxhall Victor

The Vauxhall Wyvern is a medium-sized family car introduced by Vauxhall in 1948 as a successor to the Vauxhall 12. The name comes from the mythical beast the wyvern, and may be due to a misidentification of the heraldic griffin on the Vauxhall badge.

== Wyvern LIX (1948–1951) ==
Vauxhall Wyvern LIX
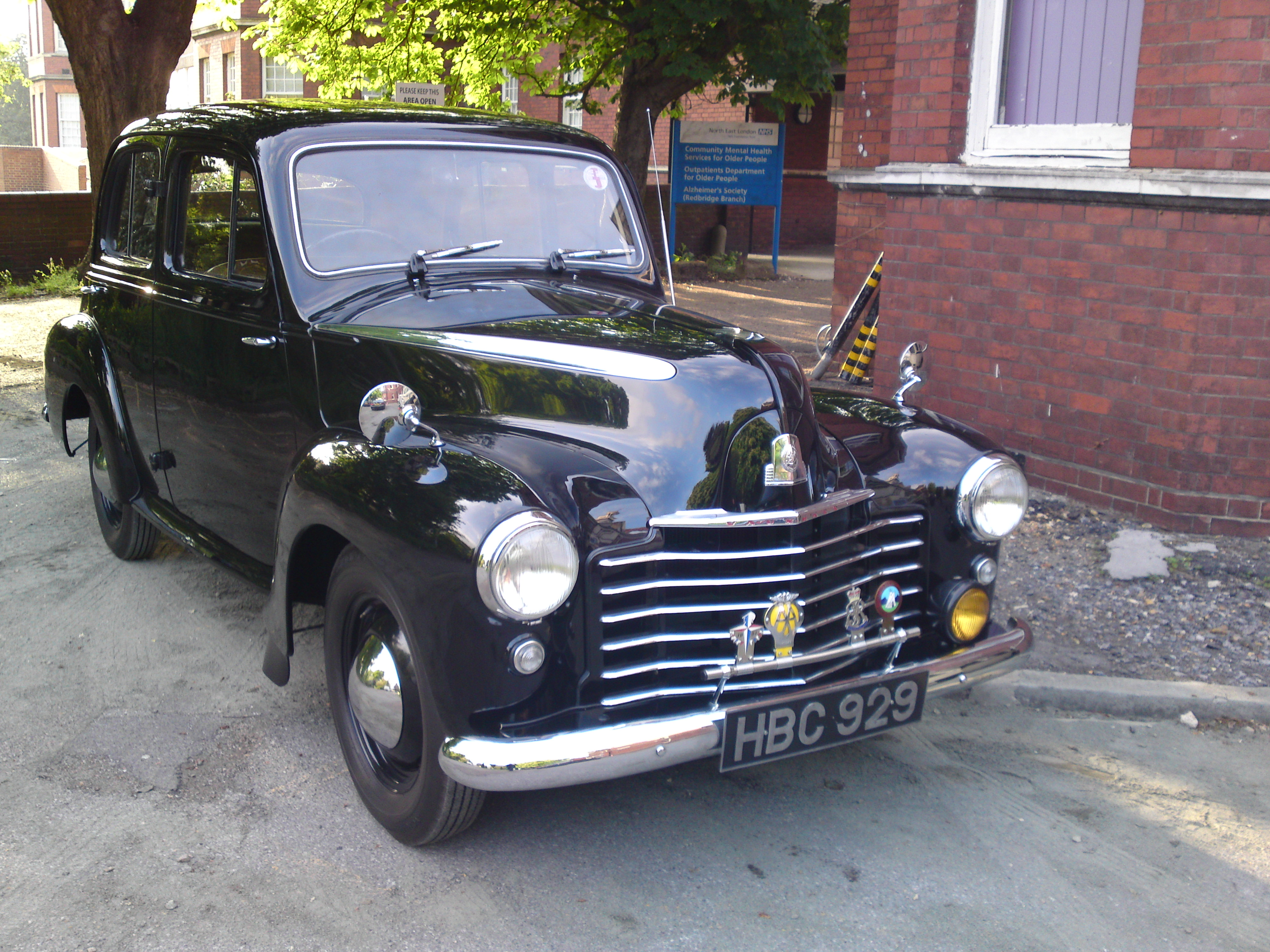
- Vauxhall Wyvern LIX

Overview
- Manufacturer: Vauxhall
- Production: 1948–1951; 55,409 made

Body and chassis
- Body style: 4-door saloon
- Related: Vauxhall Velox

Powertrain
- Engine: 1,442 cc (88.0 cu in) Straight-4; 35 bhp (26 kW)

Dimensions
- Wheelbase: 97.75 in (2,483 mm)
- Length: 164.5 in (4,178 mm)
- Width: 62 in (1,575 mm)
- Height: 65 in (1,700 mm)
- Curb weight: 1,022–1,032 kg (2,253–2,275 lb)

Chronology
- Predecessor: Vauxhall 12-4

The L-series Vauxhall Wyvern, along with the Velox, were Vauxhall's first new post-war models. Incorporating American influence, the Wyvern started production in September 1948 and finished in July 1951. Many of them were exported to help the British economy. The car was fitted with a 1,442 cc (88.0 cu in) four-cylinder engine, generating 35 bhp (26 kW), with a top speed of 62 mph (100 km/h). The optional extras available were a radio, heater and foglight. The model is a forgotten classic, with very few surviving. Due to its American styling, the Wyvern resembled a "miniaturized" Chevrolet Fleetline.

Australian vehicles carried the model code LBX.

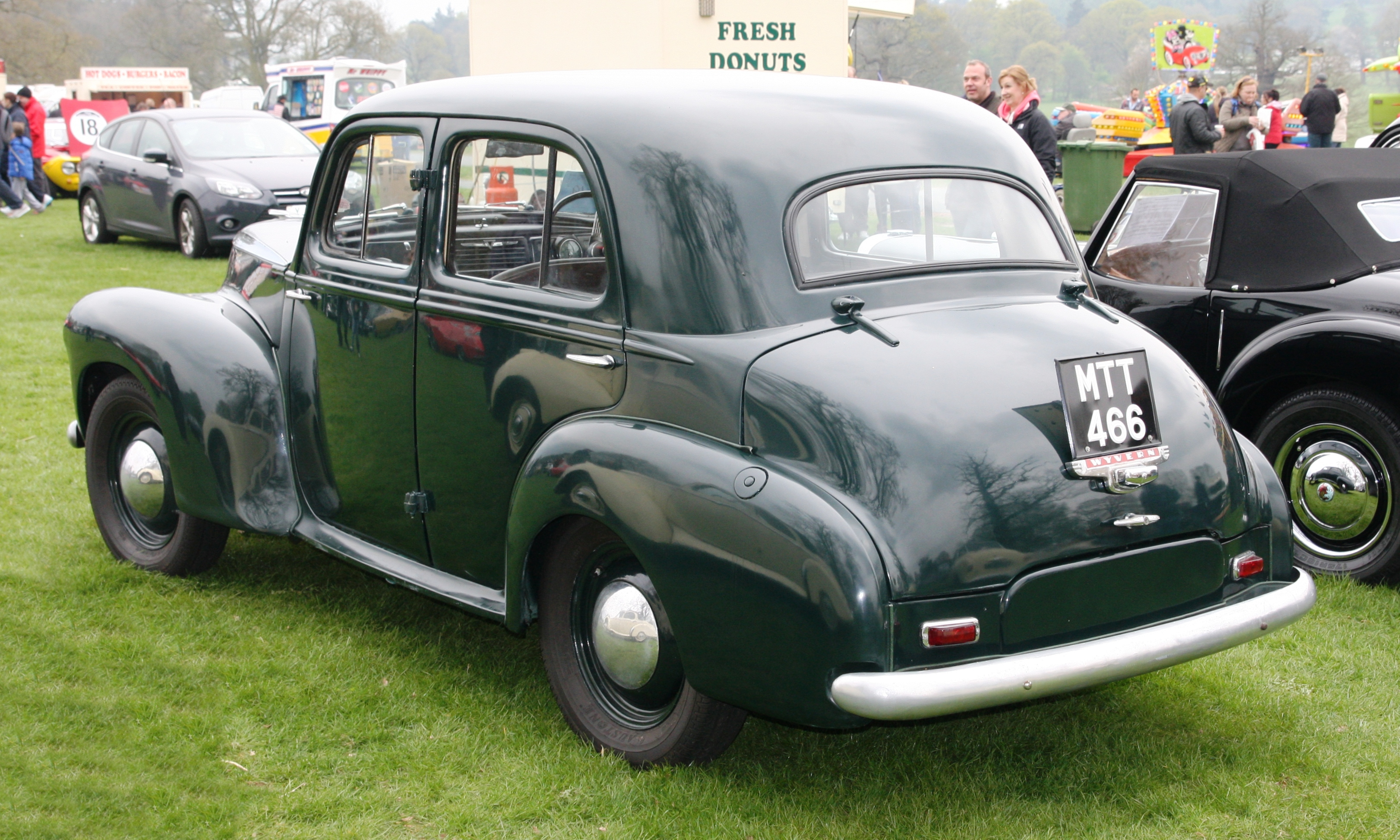
Vauxhall Wyvern LIX Saloon

== Wyvern EIX (1951–1957) ==
Vauxhall Wyvern EIX
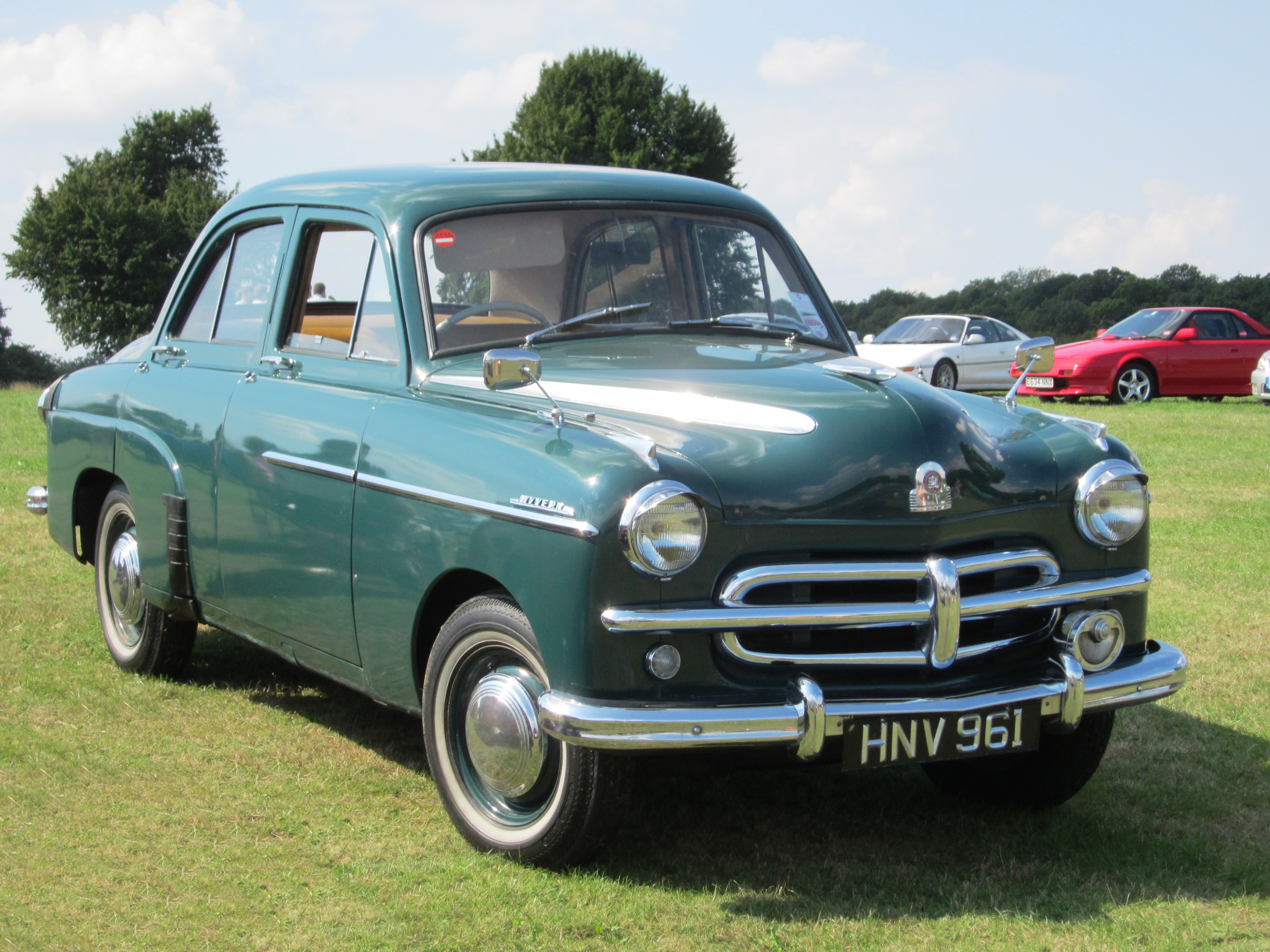
- Vauxhall Wyvern EIX (1952)

Overview
- Manufacturer: Vauxhall
- Production: 1951–1957; 110,588 produced

Body and chassis
- Body style: 4-door saloon 2-door convertible (Australia); 2-door coupe utility (Australia)
- Related: Vauxhall Velox, Vauxhall Cresta

Powertrain
- Engine: 1442 cc Straight-4; 35 bhp (26 kW) (1951–1952); 1508 cc Straight-4 45 bhp (34 kW) (1952–1957)

Dimensions
- Wheelbase: 103 in (2,616 mm)
- Length: 172.5 in (4,382 mm) (1951–1952); 170.75 in (4,337 mm) (1952–1957)
- Width: 67 in (1,702 mm) (1951–1952); 66.5 in (1,689 mm) (1952–1957)
- Height: 63 in (1,600 mm)
- Curb weight: 1,028–1,035 kg (2,266–2,282 lb)

In August 1951 a completely new Wyvern was launched, featuring a modern Ponton, three-box shape in a unitary construction body. In spite of the abandonment of the old RAC horsepower tax system which favoured long stroke engines, the old long stroke four-cylinder 35 bhp (26 kW) engine from the L-series was retained and permitted a claimed top speed above 62 mph (100 km/h) despite the car's increased size. As before, a more powerful Vauxhall Velox was available with the new body.

5313 were made.

Wyvern EIXW

After only six months production of the rebodied Wyvern the car received, in April 1952, Vauxhall's new short stroke 1508 cc four-cylinder engine. Along with its six -cylinder Velox version, the new engine had a bore of 79.3mm and a stroke of 76.2mm, identical measurements (and therefore capacity) as the rival Ford Consul/Zephyr engines introduced two years previously. With a power output of 45 bhp (34 kW) at 4,000 rpm, maximum speed rose to 72 mph (116 km/h). More performance was available from the six-cylinder Vauxhall Velox and (from 1954) Cresta versions.

The EIX series Wyvern received a new bonnet and grille in 1955, a wrap-round rear window in 1956 and another new grille in 1957.

The Wyvern sold well on the UK market until Vauxhall abandoned the six seater four cylinder market and replaced it with the smaller but more radically styled Vauxhall Victor F-Series in 1957.

A car with the 45 bhp (34 kW) engine tested by the British magazine The Motor in 1952 had a top speed of 71.6 mph (115.2 km/h) and could accelerate from 0–60 mph (97 km/h) in 37.2 seconds. A fuel consumption of 30.4 miles per imperial gallon (9.3 L/100 km; 25.3 mpg_{‑US}) was recorded. The test car cost £771 including taxes.

105,275 were made.

Wyvern EBX

The EBX model code was applied to the Australian "chassis only" variant of the Wyvern EIX.

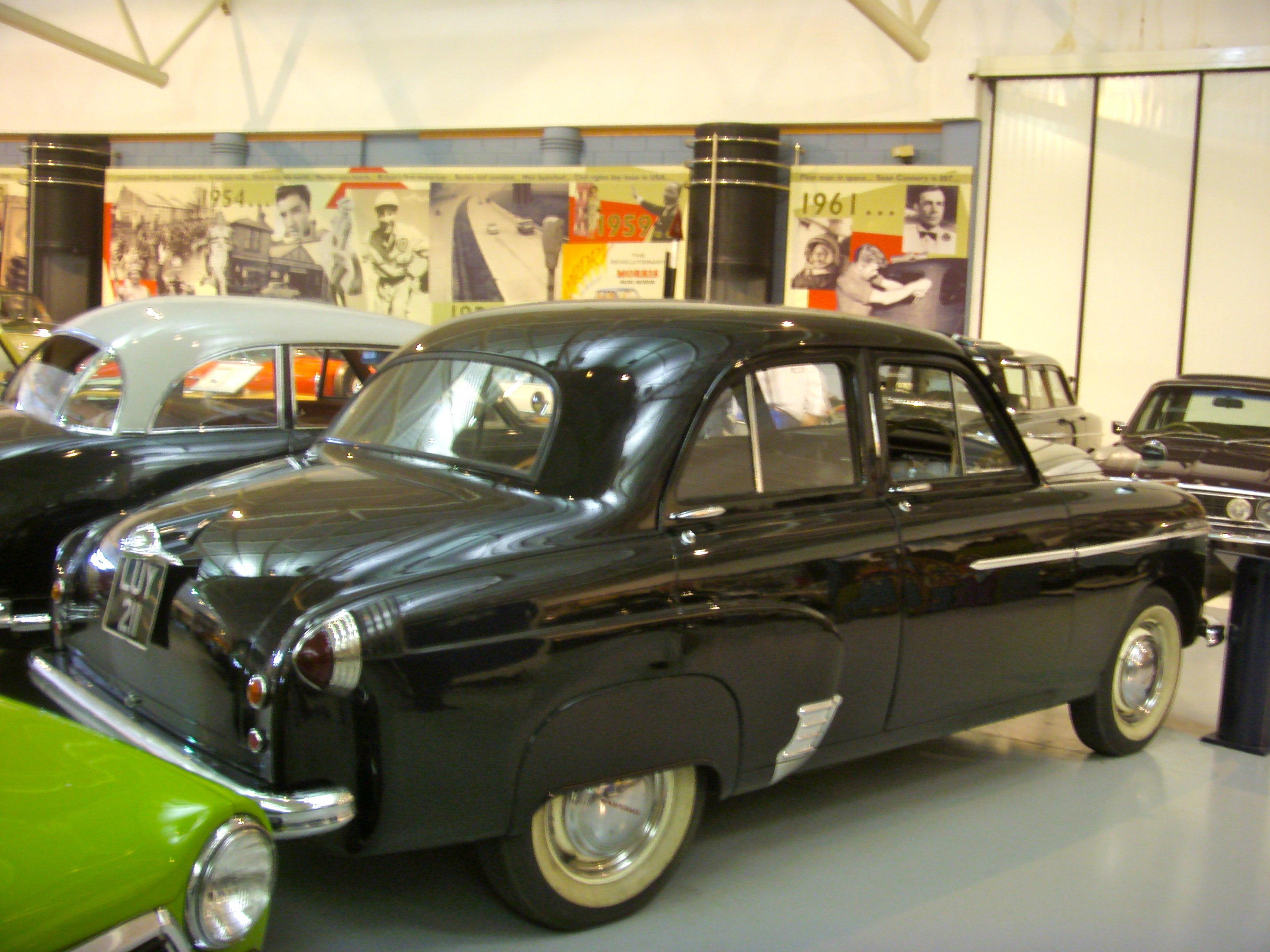
1953 Vauxhall Wyvern EIX Saloon

== Australian production by General Motors-Holden ==
General Motors-Holden produced Vauxhall Wyvern models in Australia from 1938 to 1957. Although the external appearance was very like that of the British cars, which featured unitary construction, some of Australian Vauxhalls retained a separate chassis frame. As well as countering prejudice against using "chassisless" vehicles on outback roads, the separate box girder chassis provided either an open tourer body or a utility body. The new post-war Holden car was "chassisless", so the Vauxhall gave GMH customers the option of a ute or a convertible with a chassis.

=== Wyvern 10 horsepower ===
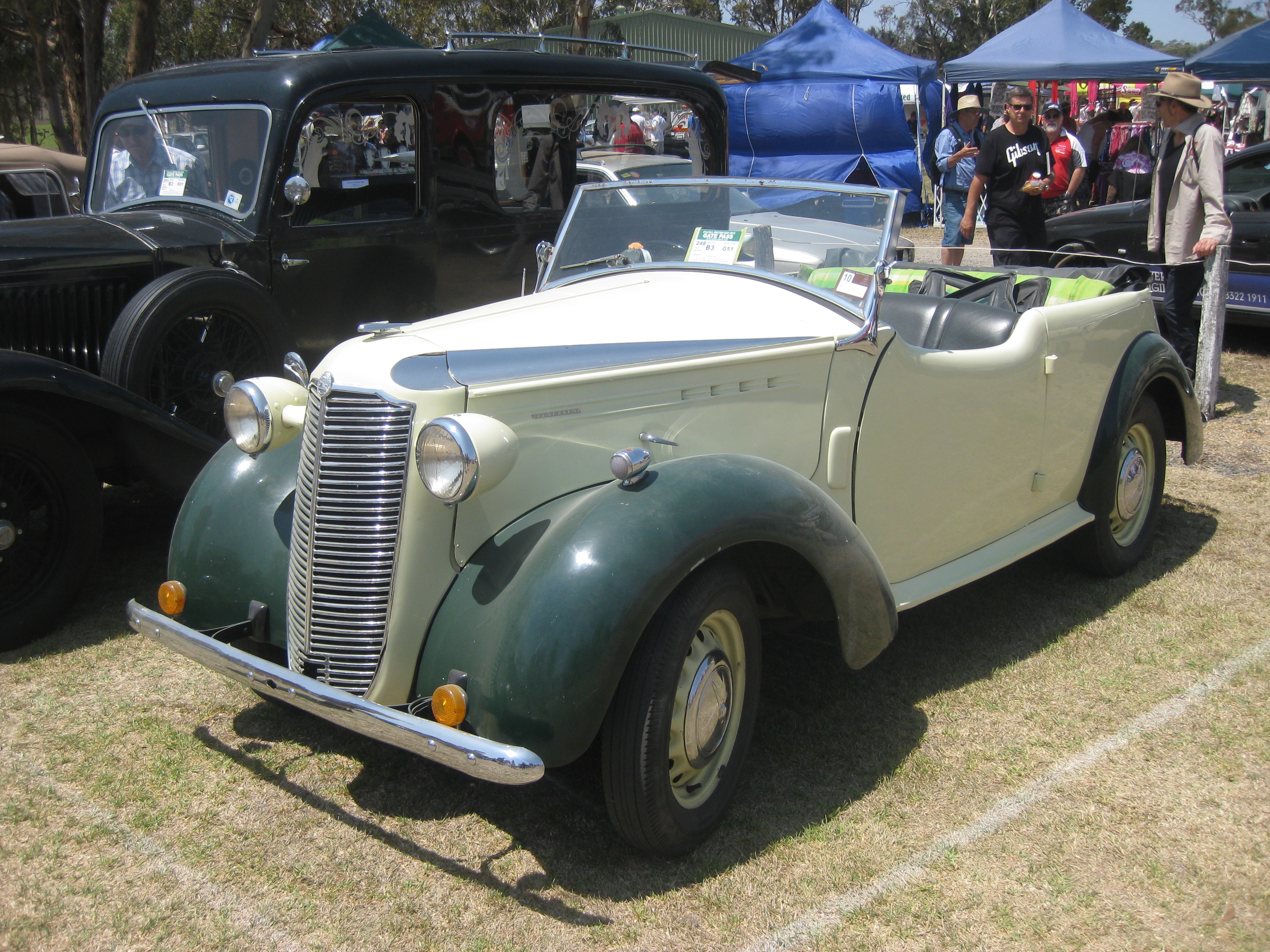
Australian 1948 Wyvern H Series "Caleche"

GMH introduced a locally built Vauxhall Wyvern model to the Australian market in 1938, ten years prior to the use of the Wyvern name in England. It was built on a separate chassis with a box-section cruciform frame. The six-light body with protruding luggage boot built to Holden's "turret-top" design used many of the front pressings of the unitary construction British Vauxhall H Series. It was produced in saloon and open Calèche body styles. The Calèche was offered in 2-seater roadster and 4-seater tourer models. The Wyvern had a 94-inch wheelbase and used a 10 hp engine. The saloon featured a six light body with a side window behind each rear door unlike the British H Series 10-4 model. The wheelbase was increased in 1940 to 97¾ inches.

Production ceased in 1941 but was resumed in 1946, using pre-war tooling. A new grille with horizontal bars was adopted, replacing the previous vertical bar design. The 10 h.p engine was used, but this was soon replaced by a 12 h.p. unit.

For an image of a 1938 sedan see external links below

=== Wyvern LBX (1948–1951) ===
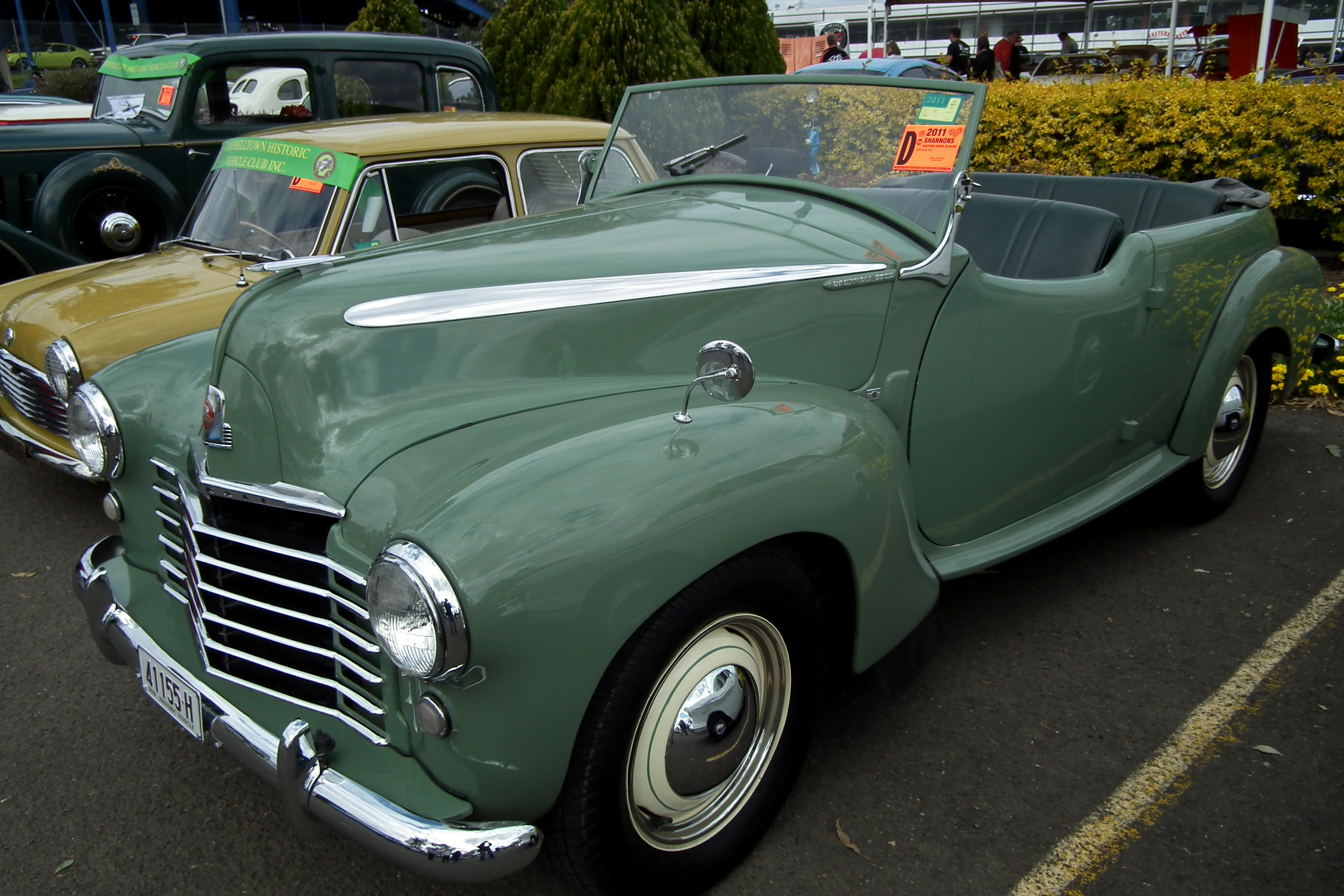
Australian Wyvern "Caleche" (L Series)

The L Series Wyvern was produced from 1948 to 1951. It was offered with an Australian developed sedan body, an Australian "Caleche" tourer body, both with a box girder chassis, or with the unitary construction English saloon body. Besides having a separate chassis the Australian sedan differed from its English counterpart in having a longer passenger cabin, a more rounded boot and an additional side window behind the rear doors. Australian vehicles carried the model code LBX.

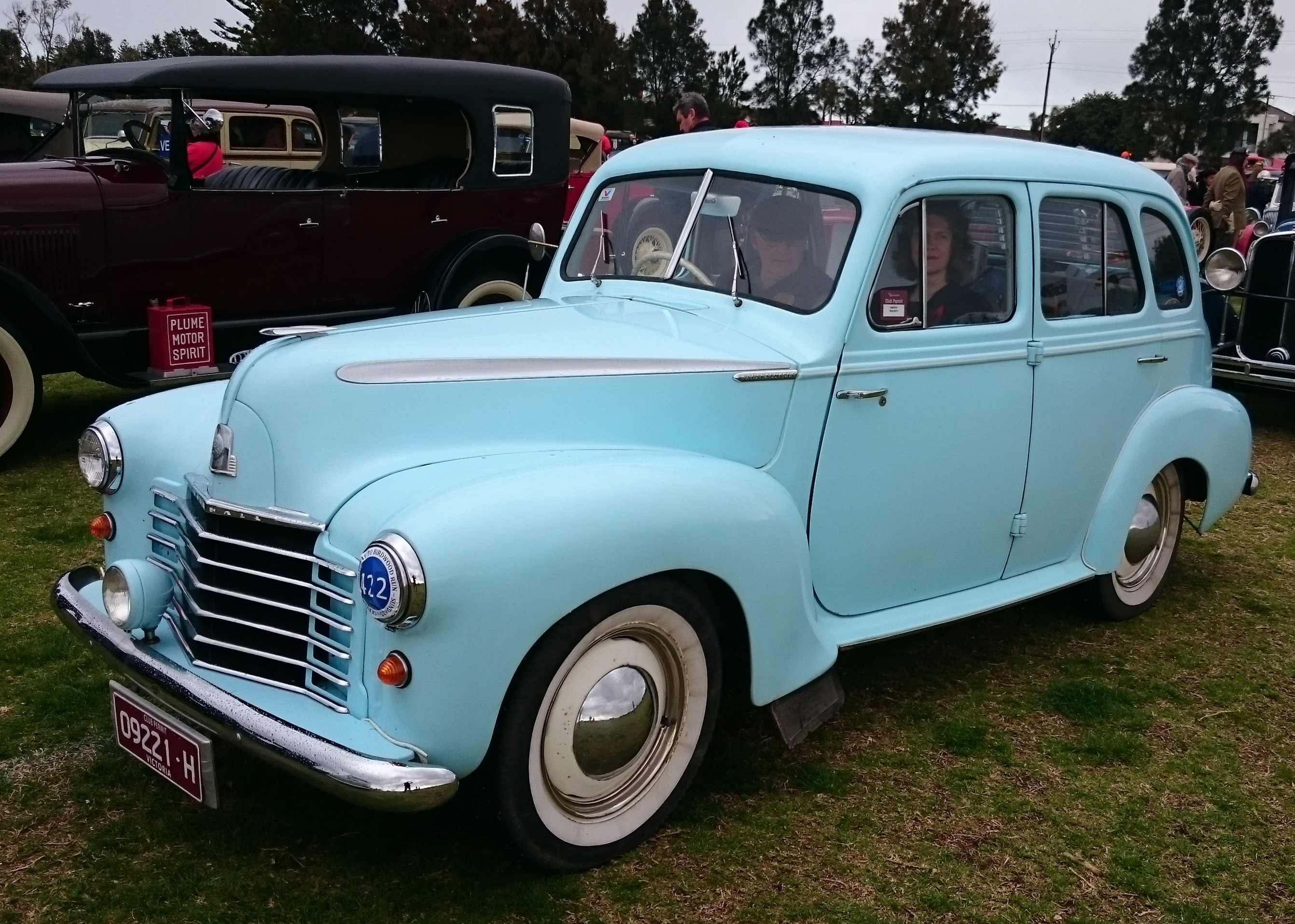
The Australian Vauxhall Wyvern Saloon (LBX) differed from the English Saloon (LIX) in having an additional window behind the rear door....

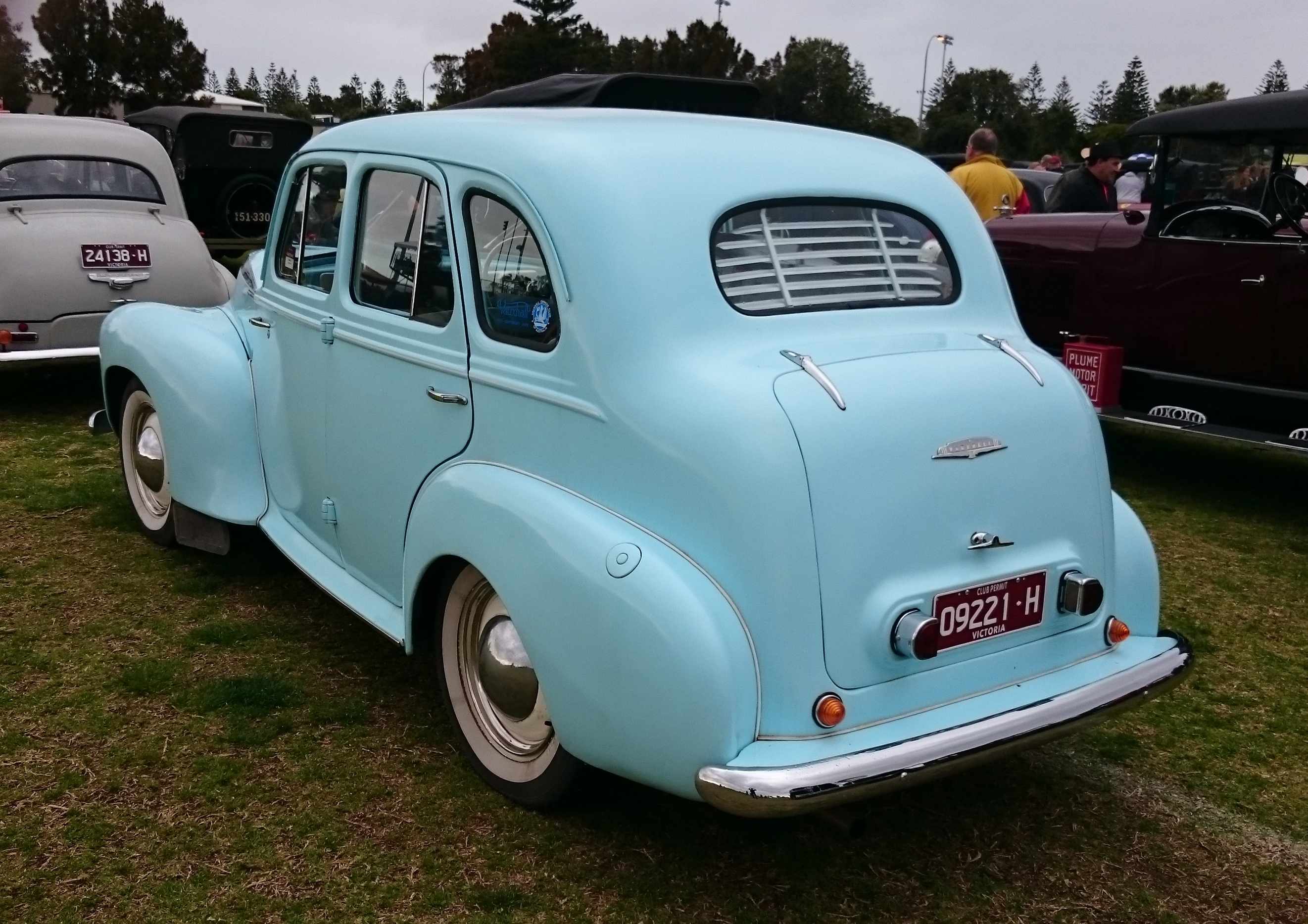
... and a more rounded boot

=== Wyvern EBX (1952–1957) ===
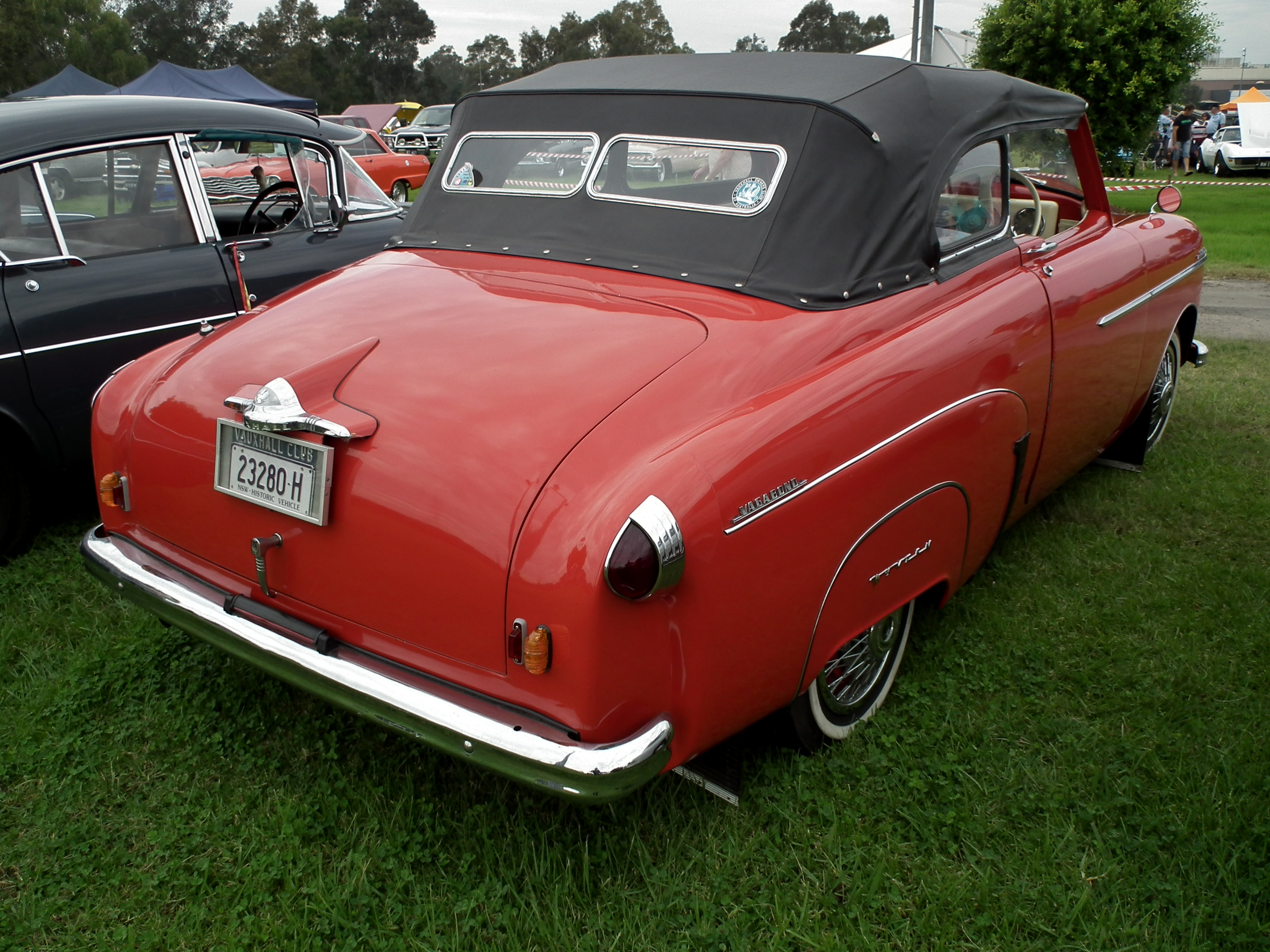
Vauxhall Wyvern Vagabond

The E Series Wyvern was produced from 1952 to 1957. In addition to building the 4-door integral body-chassis Wyvern sedan, GMH continued to build a separate chassis and developed a 2-door convertible and a Coupe Utility for it. The convertible was initially marketed as the Caleche and later as the Vagabond. 1954 was the last year for the Coupe Utility, and the Vagabond was not included in the facelifted E Series range released in April 1955.
