= Vauxhall 10-4 =

Vauxhall Ten
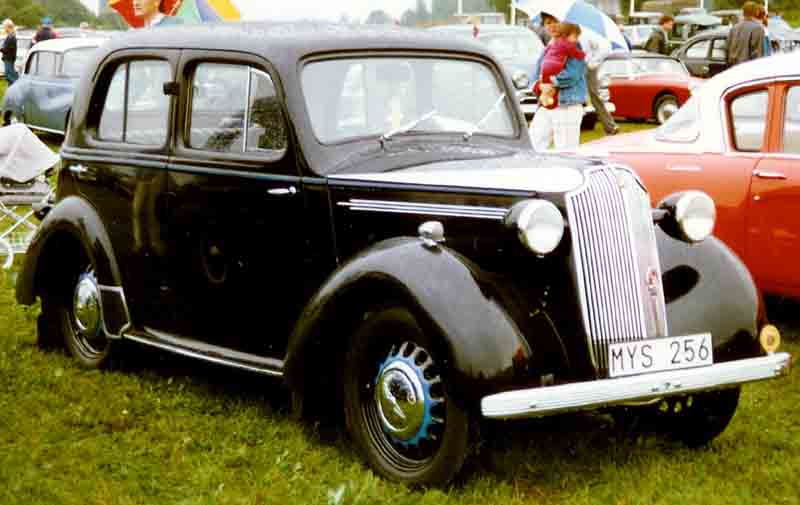
- 1938 Vauxhall Ten 4-Door Saloon

Overview
- Manufacturer: Vauxhall (General Motors)
- Also called: Vauxhall H-type or HIY-type; Vauxhall Wyvern (Australia)
- Production: 1937–1940 (H-type "Ten-Four"); 1946–1947 (model HIY "10")
- Assembly: Luton, England; Tanjung Priok, Batavia, NEI (NV GM Java)

Body and chassis
- Class: Small family car (C)
- Body style: 4-door saloon; 2-door coupé; 2-door tourer (Australia); 2-door roadster (Australia)
- Layout: Front-engine, rear-wheel-drive
- Related: Vauxhall 12-4; Bedford HC

Powertrain
- Engine: 1203 cc ohv I4; 34.5 bhp (25.7 kW) (1937–1940); 1203 cc ohv I4; 31.5 bhp (23.5 kW) (1946–1947)
- Transmission: 3-speed manual

Dimensions
- Wheelbase: 94 in (2,388 mm) (1937–1940); 97.75 in (2,483 mm) (1946–1947)
- Length: 155.5 in (3,950 mm) (1937–1940); 159 in (4,039 mm) (1946–1947)
- Width: 61 in (1,549 mm)
- Curb weight: 2,016 lb (914 kg)

The Vauxhall 10-4 is a British-built small family car produced by Vauxhall between 1937 and 1947. It was launched at the October 1937 London Motor Show and was the first British car to have a unitary construction body. The first car was delivered to a customer on 1 November 1937.

A structural innovation, following the pattern set in 1935 by GM's German subsidiary, was the Ten's integral (chassisless) construction. According to Maurice Platt, who transferred from technical journalism to a career with Vauxhall in 1937 (and would be employed as the company's Chief Engineer between 1953 and 1963), the Vauxhall Ten became known within the company as the million-pound car, which reflected the extent of the company's investment in tooling up for the new model. 1933 was the first year all GM vehicles were installed with optional vent windows which were initially called “No Draft Individually Controlled Ventilation” later renamed "Ventiplanes" which the patent application was filed on Nov. 28, 1932. It was assigned to the Ternstedt Manufacturing Company, a GM subsidiary that manufactured components for Fisher Body.

As production began, the war intervened, and Vauxhall’s Luton plant switched to truck and tank production and the Vauxhall 10 was unavailable after 1940. In 1938 and 1939 a two-door coupé version was also available, although it was built on a separate chassis as the smaller production numbers did not justify the tooling costs of a monocoque version. The 10 Coupé sat on a shortened and otherwise modified version of the earlier DX-series chassis. This meant that the more expensive coupé was heavier than the saloon and no faster, limiting its appeal although it fared better in some export markets. 55,000 Vauxhall 10-Fours were built until May 1940, when production was halted due to World War II.

The model was re-introduced in 1946 with the same 1203 cc ohv engine as before, albeit with a reduction in claimed power output. The post war Vauxhall 10 was little changed in other respects. However, with British consumers cash-strapped, and the market for small family cars of prewar design closely contested, Vauxhall withdrew their 10 in 1947. From then until the introduction of the Vauxhall Viva in 1963, the company concentrated on larger and presumably more lucrative models.

The name of the car referred to its fiscal horsepower, which at this time defined the class in which it was to compete against cars such as the Morris Ten, the Standard Ten and the Ford Model C Ten. The Vauxhall 10’s advertised horsepower in 1937 was 34 bhp (25 kW).

The 10-4 was designated by Vauxhall as the H Type, with the post-war model coded HIY. Post-war production lasted for only two years until mid 1947 when the body and chassis of the "10" received a larger 1442cc engine, pushing it up into the 12 tax horsepower bracket, and thus becoming the 1948 Vauxhall Twelve. A light commercial model was also developed and sold as the Bedford HC. This has the same engine as the passenger model, and a 672 lb (305 kg) payload.

== Australia ==
A 10-4 look-alike marketed as the Vauxhall Wyvern was built in Australia by General Motors-Holden's. The company did not have the presses needed for monocoque construction and put a 10-4 front end and mechanicals on their own chassis under their own body.

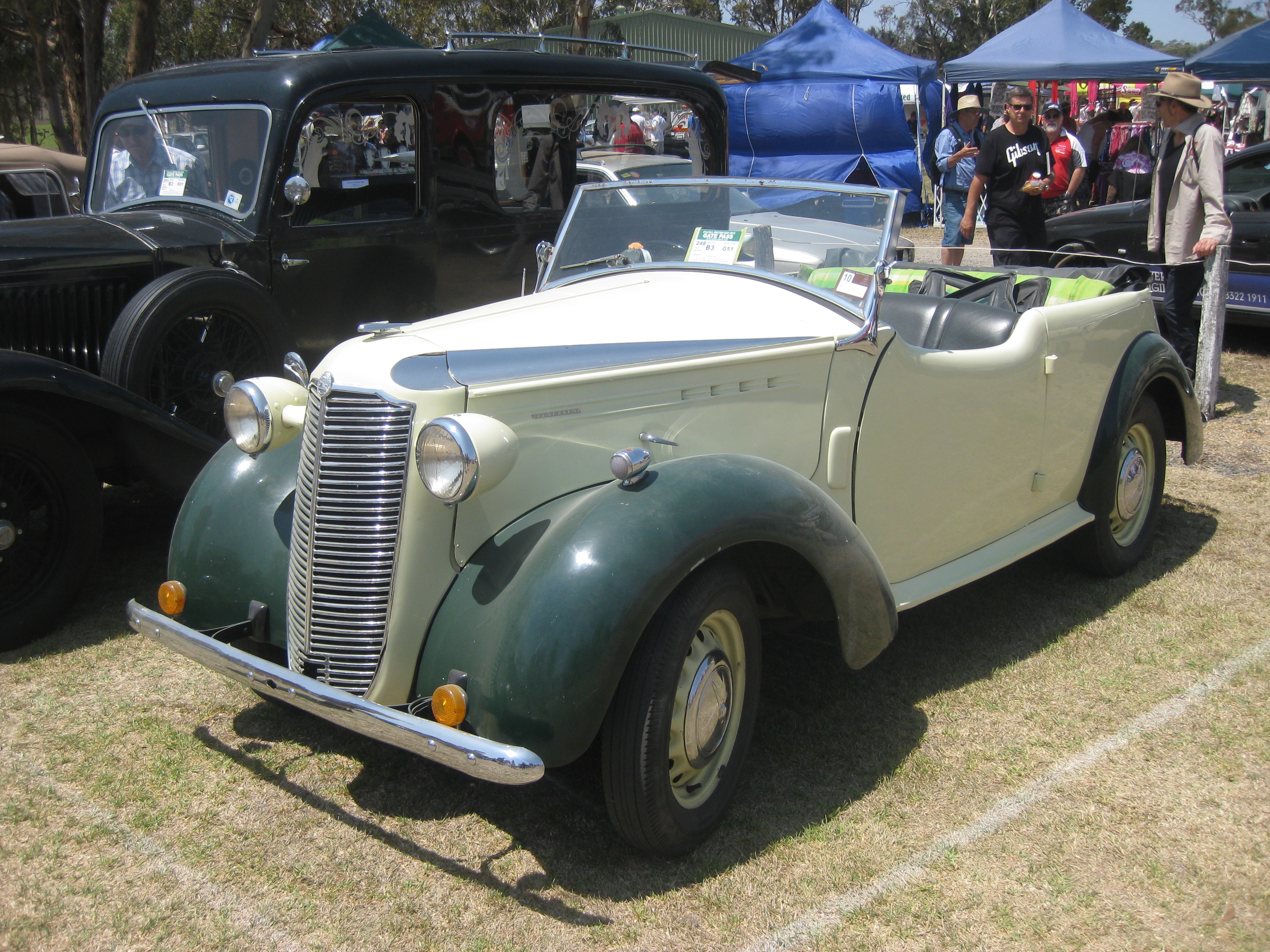
Australian produced 1948 Vauxhall Wyvern Caleche H Type

== Indonesia ==
General Motors Java also built the 10-4, beginning in 1939, and exported cars across Southeast Asia.
