= Vauxhall 12-4 =

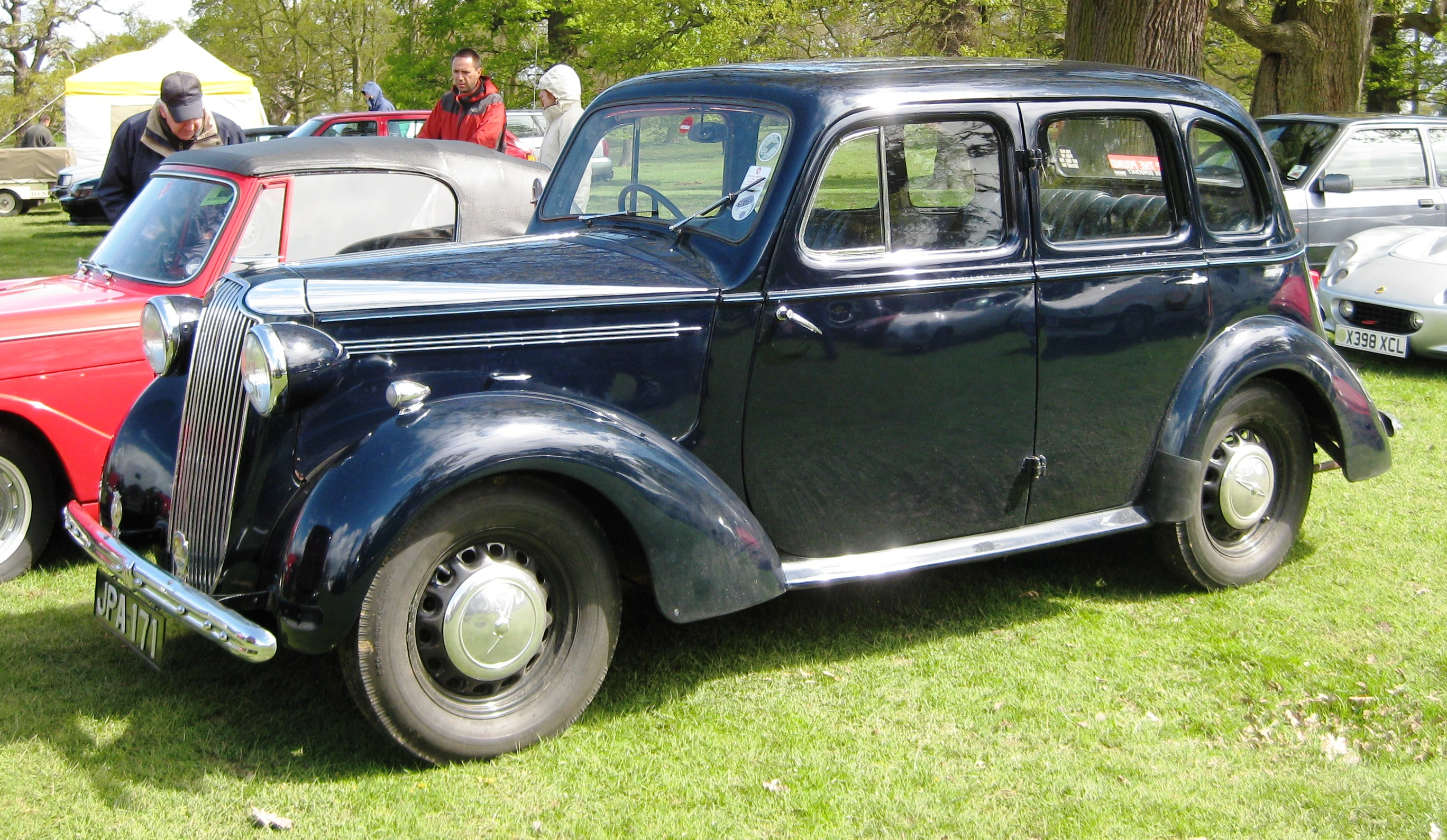
- 1939 Vauxhall 12-4 Type I

Overview
- Manufacturer: Vauxhall (General Motors)
- Also called: Vauxhall Twelve; Vauxhall Type I
- Production: 1939 to 1946
- Assembly: United Kingdom

Body and chassis
- Body style: 4-door saloon
- Layout: FR layout
- Related: Vauxhall 10-4

Powertrain
- Engine: 1442 cc 12HP I4
- Transmission: 3-speed manual

Dimensions
- Wheelbase: 101.25 in (2,572 mm)
- Length: 163 in (4,100 mm)
- Width: 61 in (1,500 mm)

Chronology
- Predecessor: Vauxhall Light Six
- Successor: Vauxhall Wyvern

The Vauxhall 12-4 is an automobile which was produced by Vauxhall in the United Kingdom from 1939 to 1940 and in 1946.

== Model I ==
The car, also known as the Type I, was a total redesign and given the new 12-4 name. It featured a longer six-light body based on the Vauxhall 10 but with a monocoque hull with independent torsion-bar front suspension and semi-elliptic leaf springs at the rear. Lockheed hydraulic drum brakes were fitted all round to the same design as the 10-4 and featured a split circuit to prevent complete loss of braking in the event of a fluid leak.

The engine was a 4-cylinder 1.4-litre (1442 cc) with overhead valves enlarged from the 10-4 by increasing the bore from 63.5mm to 69.5mm and keeping the same 95mm stroke. A Zenith carburettor was fitted. For UK taxation purposes it was rated at 11.98 hp. The actual output was 35 bhp (26 kW) at 3600 rpm. This engine was also used in the Bedford JC and PC light commercials. The gearbox was the 3-speed, with synchromesh on second and top, that was used in the 10-4.

Two versions of the saloon body were available, a Standard and a De-luxe, the latter featuring a sliding sunroof. The Standard version was dropped for the 1940 year.

The Autocar magazine tested a de-luxe saloon in 1938 and found it would reach 65 mph (105 km/h) and accelerate from 0-50 mph (80 km/h) in 22 seconds.

Production pre-war was 10,164 and in 1946 just 6 more of the pre-war version were made.

== Model HIX ==
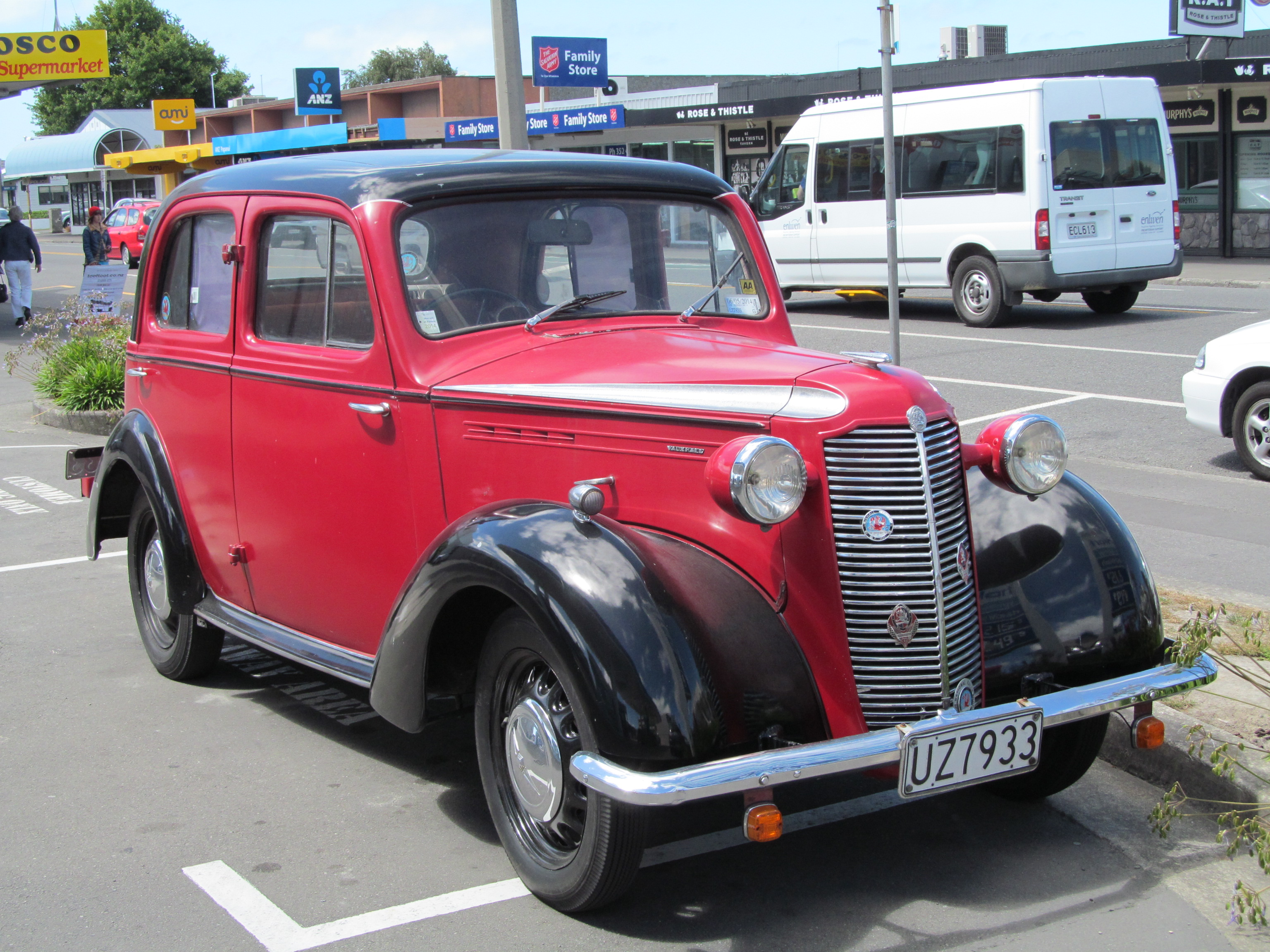
1947 New Zealand registered HIX type showing the post-war horizontal bar grille.

For 1946 the I-type body was replaced by the 98 in (2,500 mm) wheelbase one used on the H type 10-4 painted in black, maroon or blue. Both the 10 and 12 hp cars sold for the same price. In 1947 material shortages caused cloth seats to replace the previous leather ones. Production continued until 1948 when the car was replaced by the Wyvern.

Combined production of the 10-4 and 12-4 was 44,047.
