= Holbrook Bodies =

Defunct Coventry coach-building company

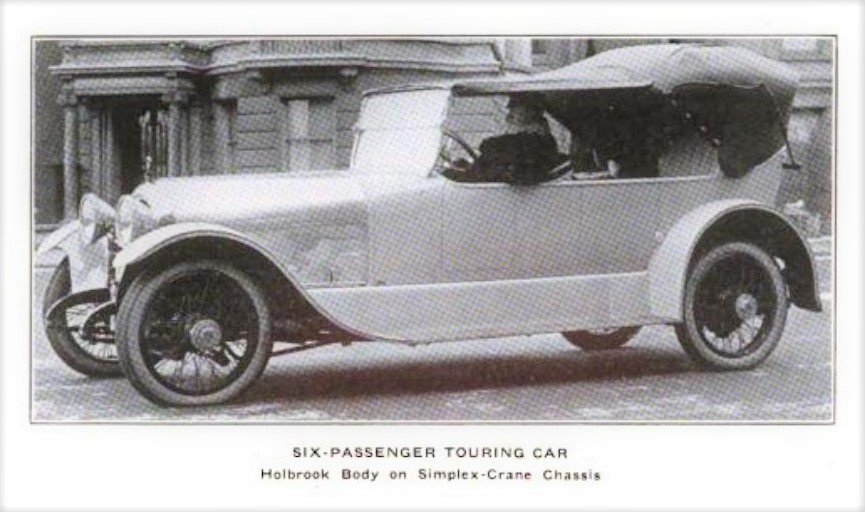
1917 Simplex Crane Model 5 with a Holbrook Touring body

Holbrook Bodies Limited of Holbrook Lane, Foleshill, Coventry was a coachbuilder which made series coachbuilt bodies for low volume car manufacturers. Opened in 1926 it suffered a financial collapse in 1933 and its premises (apparently previously occupied by Motor Bodies (Coventry) Limited) were later taken over by the adjacent plant of SS Cars. It was run by a Capt. Stonehouse backed by William Oubridge of the British Piston Ring Company.
