= Vauxhall Light Six =

Vauxhall Light 6
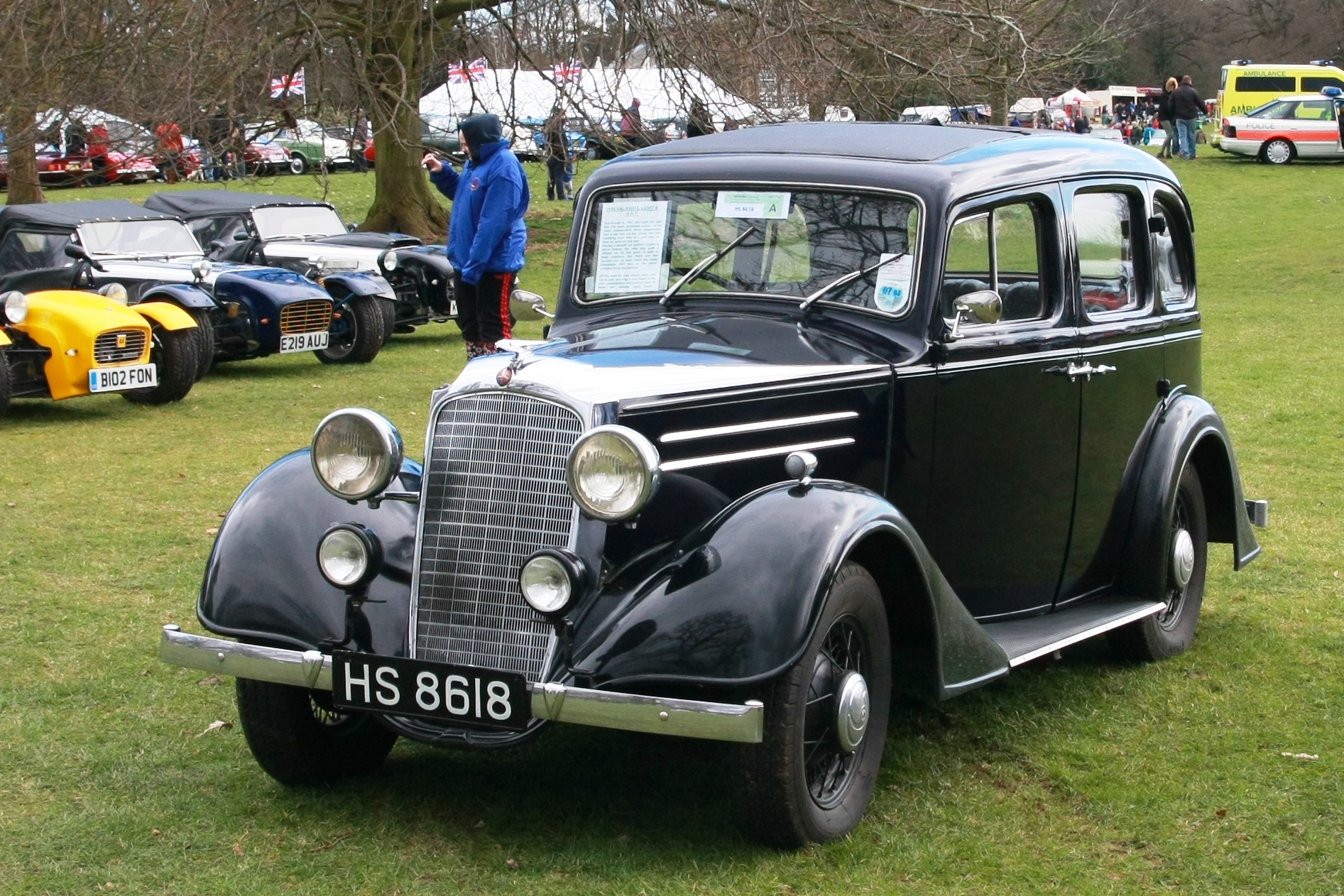
- 1935 Vauxhall Light 6

Overview
- Manufacturer: Vauxhall (General Motors)
- Also called: Vauxhall Fourteen; Vauxhall ASY/ASX; Vauxhall DY/DX
- Production: 1933 to 1938
- Assembly: United Kingdom

Body and chassis
- Body style: 4-door saloon 2-door coupé 2-door roadster
- Layout: FR layout

Powertrain
- Engine: 1530cc or 1781cc I6

Dimensions
- Wheelbase: 101 in (2,600 mm)
- Length: 154 in (3,900 mm)

Chronology
- Predecessor: Vauxhall Cadet
- Successor: Vauxhall 14-6

The Vauxhall Light 6 is an automobile which was produced by Vauxhall in the United Kingdom from 1933 to 1938.

== Model ASY/ASX ==
Based on the Vauxhall Cadet the new car had a smaller version of the existing engine created by lengthening the stroke to 100 mm and reducing the bore to 57 mm for the 1530 cc ASY and 61.5 mm for the 1781 cc ASX. With overhead valves and Zenith down-draught carburetor the smaller engine produced 36bhp at 4000 rpm and the 1781 cc produced 43bhp at 3500 rpm. The power was transmitted to the rear axle via a single-plate clutch to a 4-speed gearbox, with “silent third” and synchromesh on 3rd & 4th gears. Twelve volt electrics were fitted.

The Cadet chassis was shortened by 6 in (150 mm) and extra cross-members added. Semi-elliptic leaf spring suspension was fitted to front and rear axles.

The factory standard bodies used many panels from the Cadet but the radiator was now sloped back slightly and the filler cap was under the bonnet. All the windows used "Triplex" toughened glass. The chassis was also supplied to external coachbuilders.

The launch price for the standard saloon was £195 allowing Vauxhall to advertise a 12hp car for less than £200. Unusually, the 14hp ASX was sold for the same price and became by far the better seller.

1933 was also the first year all GM vehicles were installed with optional vent windows which were initially called “No Draft Individually Controlled Ventilation” later renamed "Ventiplanes" which the patent application was filed on Nov. 28, 1932. It was assigned to the Ternstedt Manufacturing Company, a GM subsidiary that manufactured components for Fisher Body.

=== Body types ===
- Standard Saloon (12 hp only)
- De Luxe Saloon (by Vauxhall) with sliding roof and no-draught ventilation
- Fixed Head Coupé (by Vauxhall) 2-door with sliding roof and no-draught ventilation

Special Coachwork

- Tickford Foursome Coupé (by Salmons)
- Pendine 4-seater Sports Tourer (by Holbrook)
- Suffolk Saloon Sports Tourer (by Holbrook)
- Stratford 4-seater Sports (by Whittingham & Mitchel)
- Tourer (by Duple)
- 2-seater with Dickey (by Duple)

23,294 cars were produced.

== Model DY/DX ==
The model was revised in 1935 and given new designations although they kept the same engines. The chassis was re-designed with Dubonnet type independent front suspension enabling the engine to be moved forwards.

A revised version appeared in 1937 with a curved radiator grille and pressed-steel wheels replacing the wire-spoked ones.

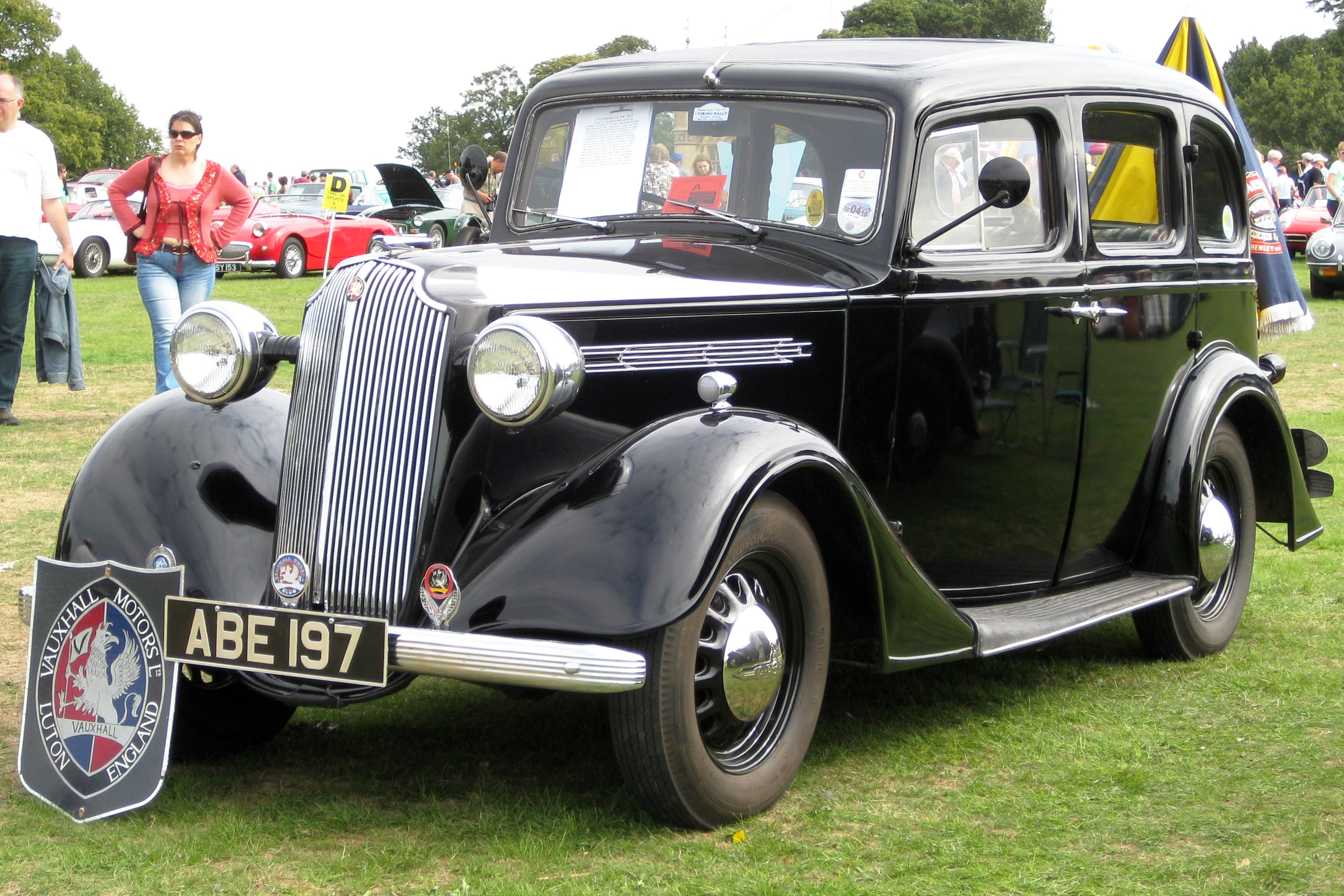
1936-38 saloon with the updated grille

20,026 of the earlier cars and 39,537 of the post 1937 version were produced.
