= List of Vauxhall vehicles =

Vauxhall vehicles, past and present, sold under the Vauxhall brand, now a subsidy of Stellantis.

== Current and past production vehicles ==
=== Cars ===
- 10-4 Model H (1937–1947)
- 12-4 Model I (1937–1946)
- 12-14 X (1904-)
- 12-16 X (1904-)
- 14 and 14-40 M & LM (1922–1927)
- 14 ASY/ASX & DY/DX Light Six (1933–1939)
- 14-6 Model J (1938–1948) Light Six
- 16 B (1909-)
- 16-20 A (1912–1915)
- 20 A (1908–1912)
- 20 C Prince Henry (1911–1912)
- 20 BY/BX Big Six (1934–1936)
- 20-60 R & T (1927–1930)
- 22 A (1912)
- 22 C Prince Henry (1912–1914)
- 23-60 OD (1922–1926)
- 25 D (1912–1922)
- 25 GY/GL Big Six (1937–1940)
- 25-70 (1926–1928)
- 27 B (1910–1914)
- 27 BXL Big Six (1934–1936)
- 30 B (1910–1914)
- 30-98 E & OE (1913–1922)
- 35 B (1910–1914)
- 80 T/T80 (1930–1932)
- A-type (1911–1914)
- B-type (1910–1914)
- C-type "Prince Henry" (1911–1913)
- D-type (1912–1922)
- E-type (1913–1922)
- Adam (2013–2019)
- Agila (2000–2015)
- Albany
- Ampera (2012–2015, rebadged Chevrolet Volt)
- Antara (2006–2015)
- Astra (1980–present)
- Belmont (1986–1991)
- Cadet (1931–1933)
- Calibra (1990–1997)
- Carlton (1978–1994)
- Cavalier (1975–1995)
- Chevette (1975–1984)
- Corsa (1993–present)
- Cresta (1954–1972)
- Crossland X (2017–present)
- Envoy (1960–1970), see Victor
- Epic (1963–1970), see Viva
- Equus (1978)
- Firenza (1970–1975)
- Frontera (1991–2004, rebadged Isuzu MU Wizard)
- Grandland X (2017–present)
- Insignia (2008–present)
- Magnum (1973–1978)
- Mokka (2012–present)
- Monaro (2001–2005)
- Monterey (1994–1999, rebadged Isuzu Trooper)
- Meriva (2003–2017)
- Nova (1983–1993)
- Omega (1994–2003)
- Royale (1978–1986), rebadged Opel Senator
- Senator (1978–1994)
- Signum (2003–2008)
- Silver Aero (1983)
- Silver Bullet (1976)
- Sintra (1997–1999)
- Six (1933–1938)
- SRV (1970)
- T and T80 (1930–1932)
- Tigra (1994–2000, 2004–2009)
- Vectra (1995–2008)
- Trixx (2004)
- Velox (1948–1965)
- Ventora (1968–1972)
- Viceroy (1978–1982), rebadged Opel Commodore
- Victor (1957–1972)
- Viscount (1966–1972)
- Viva (1963–1979)
- VX220 (2001–2005)
- VX4/90 (1961–1972)
- VX Lightning (limited edition VX220)
- VXR8 (2007–2017)
- Wyvern (1948–1957)
- Zafira (1999–2015)
- Zafira Tourer (2011–2018)

=== Vans ===
- Bedford Beagle (1964–1973)
- Bedford Astramax (1986–1993)
- Bedford Rascal (1986–1993, rebadged Suzuki Supercarry), also available badged Vauxhall.
- Bedford CF
- Bedford Midi also available badged Vauxhall
- Bedford Dormobile
- Arena (1997–2000, rebadged Renault Trafic)
- Combo (1994–present)
- Movano 1/2 (1999–2021)
- Movano 3 (2021–present)
- Vivaro (2001–present)

== See also ==
- Vauxhall Motors
