= Vauxhall D-Type =

Vauxhall 25 D type
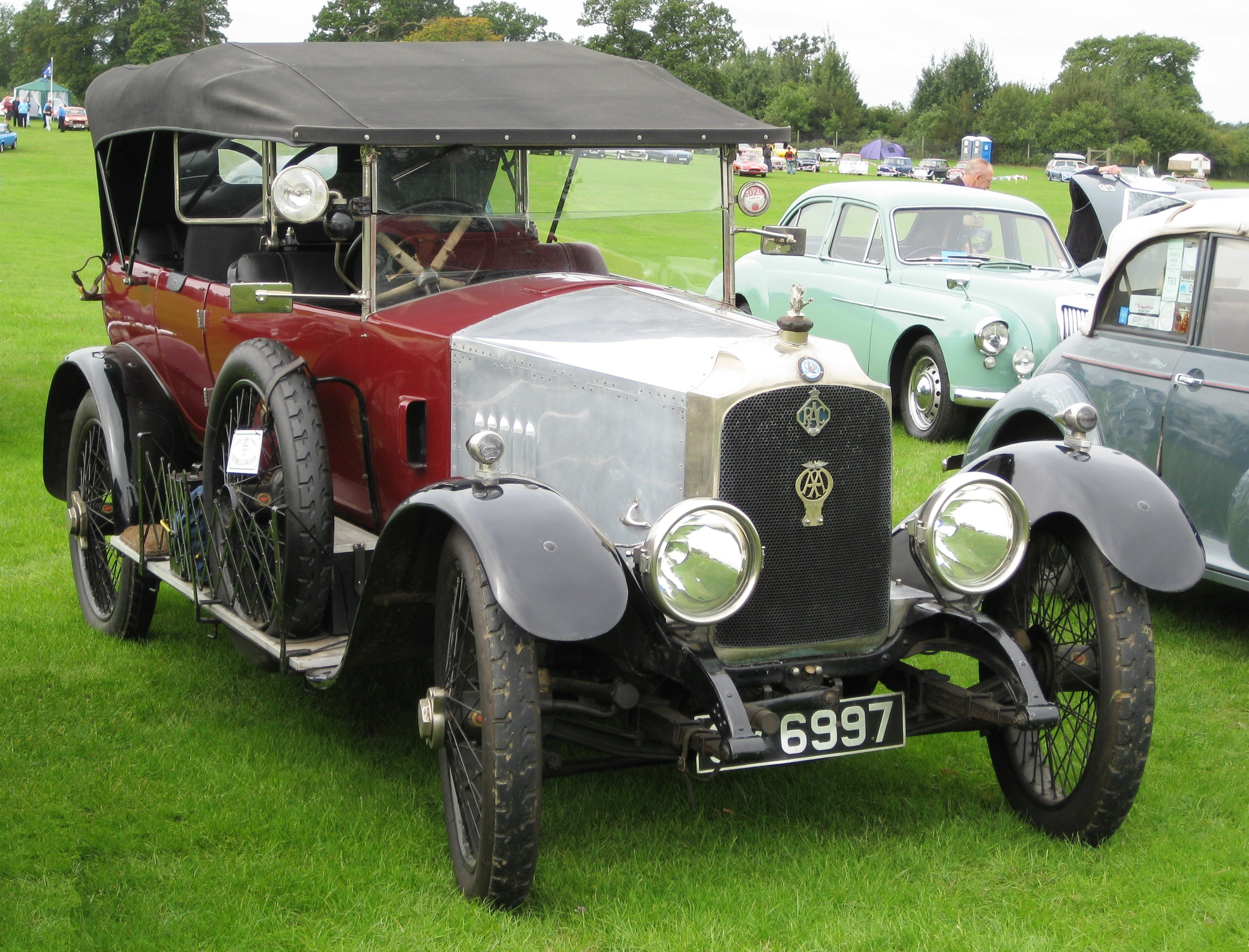
- registered December 1922

Overview
- Manufacturer: Vauxhall
- Production: 1912; 1913–1915; 1921
- Assembly: Luton

Body and chassis
- Body style: Kington 4-5 seater open car (tourer); cabriolet; limousine; landaulette; Chassis only — for customer's bespoke coachwork
- Layout: FR layout

Powertrain
- Engine: 3,969 cc (242 cu in) I4

Dimensions
- Wheelbase: 132 in (3,353 mm) track 54 in (1,372 mm)
- Length: not supplied; 174 in (4,420 mm); not supplied
- Width: not supplied; 68 in (1,727 mm); not supplied

Chronology
- Predecessor: Vauxhall 27
- Successor: Vauxhall 23-60

The Vauxhall 25 h.p. chassis code D type is a car manufactured by Vauxhall from 1912 to 1922. More than 1,500 were supplied to the British Army in World War I for use as staff cars. Each Vauxhall chassis was sold with a three-year guarantee including regular inspections.

The 25hp car appeared for the first time at the Olympia Motor Show in November 1912 alongside two of its three stablemates: the 6-cylinder 5-litre 30hp car and the lighter weight 25hp Prince Henry. All cars had a new tapered bonnet which "runs flush into the body". The smallest Vauxhall 16-20 was not displayed.

Vauxhall's 23-60 replaced the 25 in July 1922.

== History ==
Vauxhall 25 horsepower also Prince Henry 24

Overview
- Manufacturer: Vauxhall Motors Limited
- Production: 1912; 1913–1915; 1921

Layout
- Configuration: Straight-4
- Displacement: 3,969 cc (242 cu in)
- Cylinder bore: 95 mm (3.7 in)
- Piston stroke: 140 mm (5.5 in)
- Valvetrain: side valve

Combustion
- Fuel system: not supplied; W & P; Zenith
- Cooling system: water, belt driven water pump

Output
- Power output: 50 @ 2,000 rpm; not supplied; not supplied; Tax horsepower 22.38

In 1911 Vauxhall introduced its Prince Henry which had much sporting success. Many of these cars were fitted with heavy bodies and to better cater for this trade, Vauxhall re-tuned the engine, de-rating the maximum power to 60 bhp (45 kW). The 25 was marketed as the "weight carrying chassis". Top speed is around 60 mph.

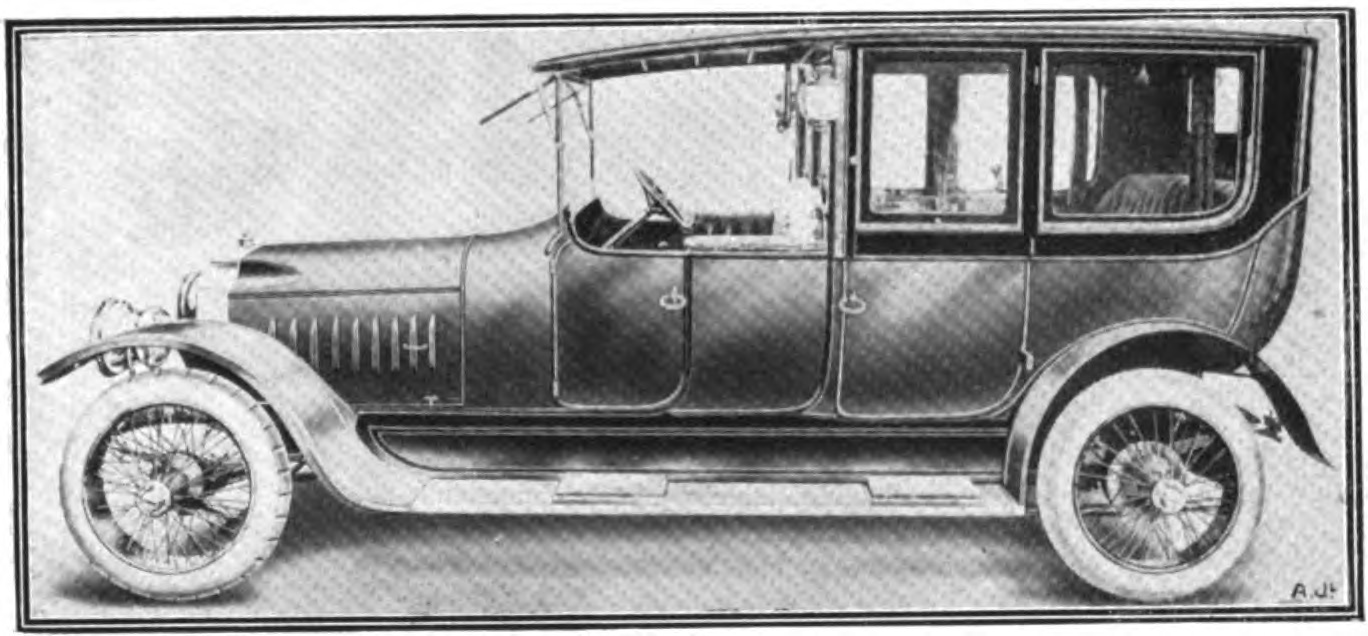
Brendon limousine for 1913

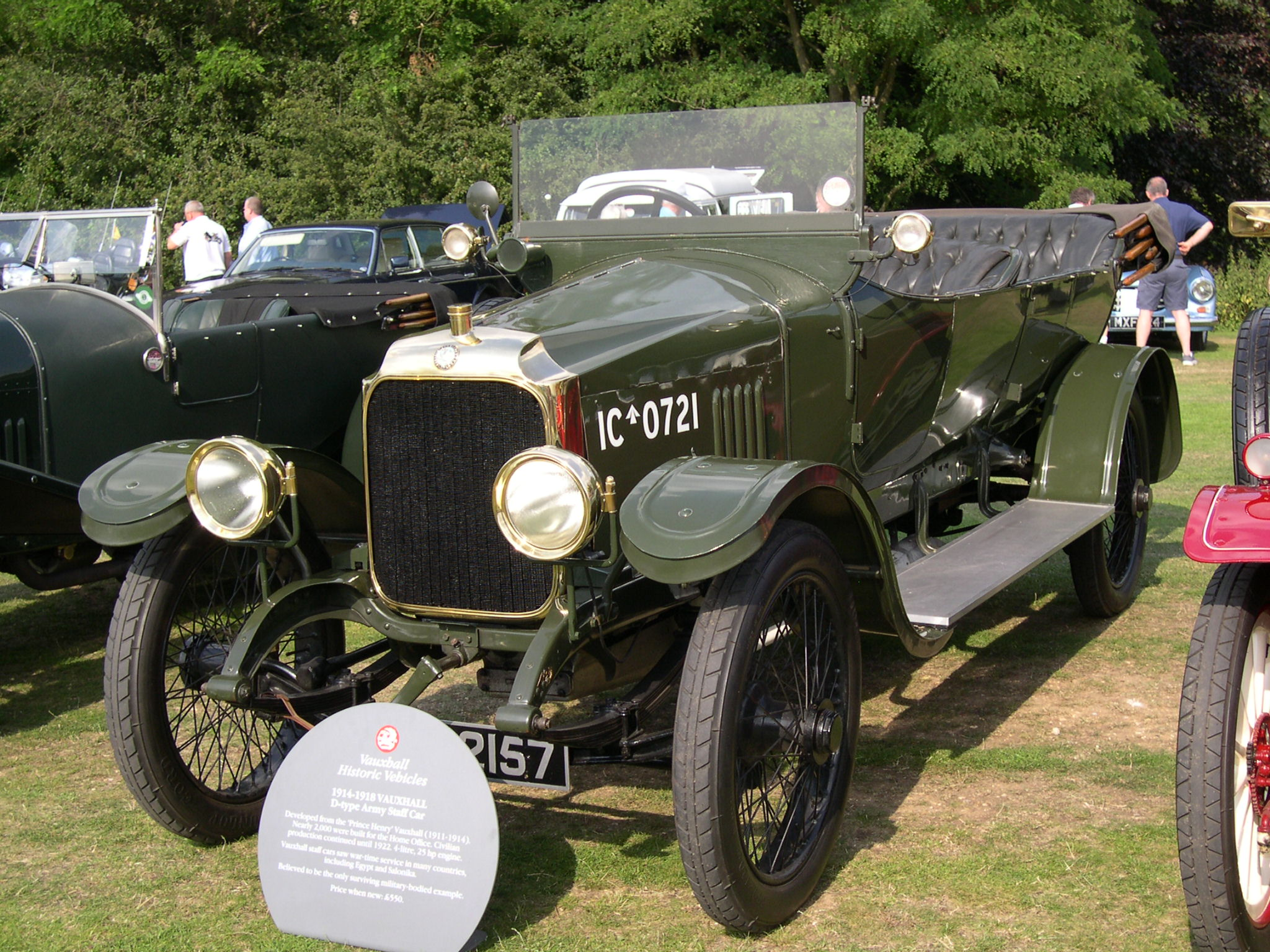
The wartime staff car 1914

on the Western Front, France

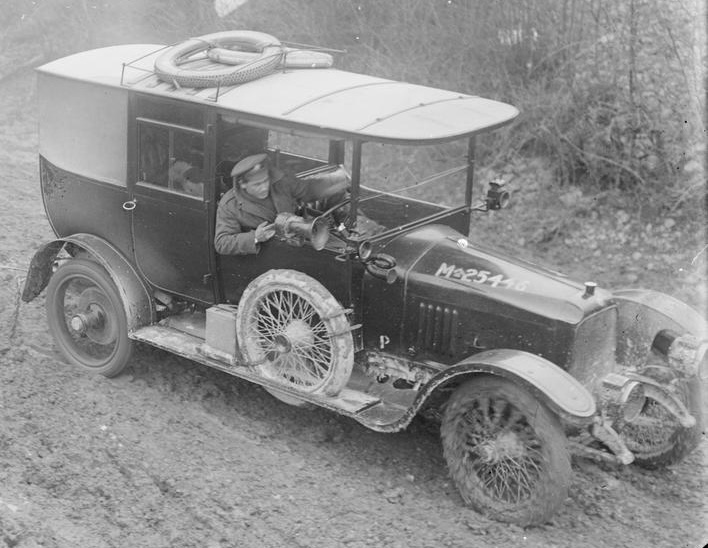

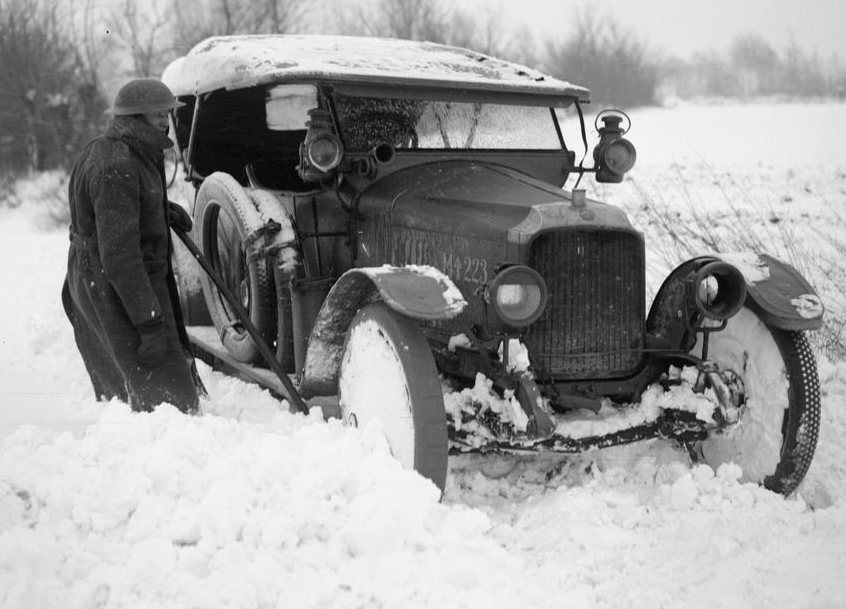

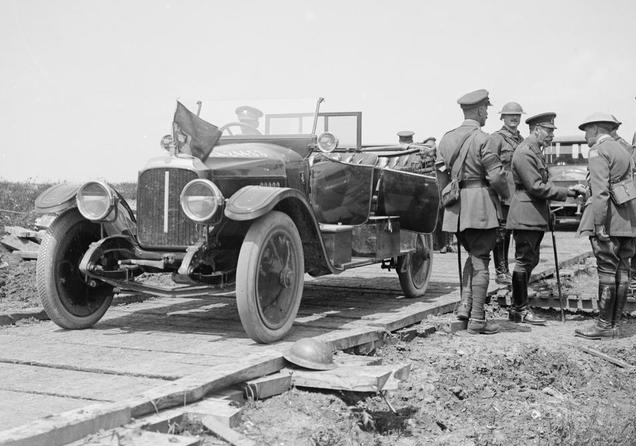
George V Vimy Ridge 11 July 1917

== Engineering ==
The substantial chassis has semi elliptic leaf springs and rigid axles front and rear. The engine, with fixed cylinder head and bore of 95mm and stroke of 140mm, drives the rear wheels via a multi-plate clutch and four speed transmission separated from the engine. The engine, clutch and gearbox are mounted on a sub frame. There are no brakes on the front wheels but the car has a transmission brake immediately behind the gearbox operated by the foot pedal. The rear wheel brakes are operated by hand lever inside the car.

About 4500 were made in total including 1556 supplied to the armed forces. It was superseded by the 23-60 which had an overhead valve engine and was later fitted with four wheel brakes.

== Road Test — swift and silky running ==
In April 1921 — having tried what he regarded as a new model — the motoring correspondent of The Times wrote: "Speed is an asset in a motor-car. Few motorists of experience care to drive at high speed habitually but the feeling that the car has a big reserve of power which may at any time be loosed, and the ability to indulge, on open stretches of road, in bursts of exhilarating speed, to flatten out hills almost as though they were level ground are pleasures which few can fail to appreciate once the charm has cast its spell."

Vauxhall's new 25hp model results from valuable experience gained between 1914 and 1919. The War Department models were undeniably harsh and little attempt was made to provide a refined car but, in this new car, speed stability and smoothness have been successfully combined.

Rear brake adjustment is not well placed and requires tools.

This Vauxhall's signs of progress in motor-car design include: an oil filter at the bottom of the crankcase readily extracted from the front without trouble; easily carried out adjustments may be made to the air pressure pump supplying the carburettor with petrol, the timing chain, the fan belt. Redesign of lubricating systems: the front gearbox bearing is accessed through a quickly detachable lid etc.; the valve stems are lubricated; grease-cups have been replaced by ball-valve oilers. Fitted tool cases are provided in the running boards.

He summed up his lengthy report with this assessment: "A thoroughly well-bred machine of the greyhound type"

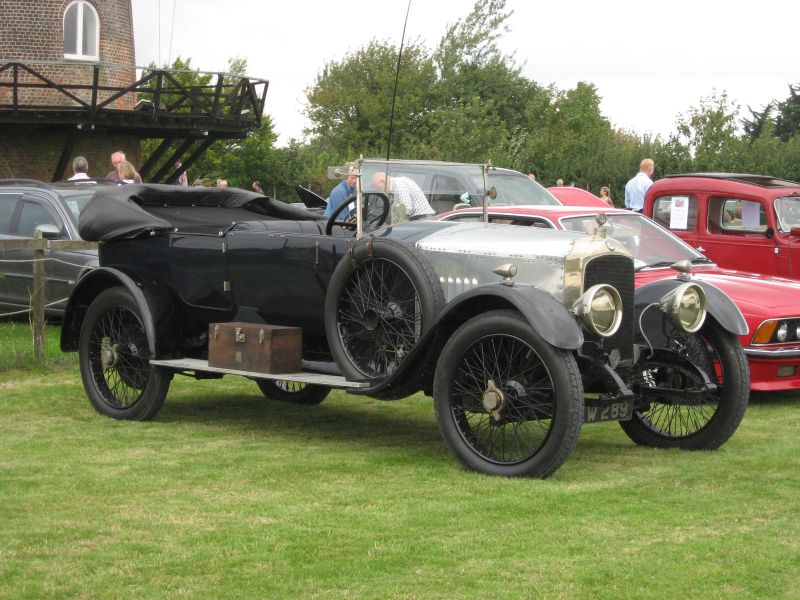
Kington tourer 1921

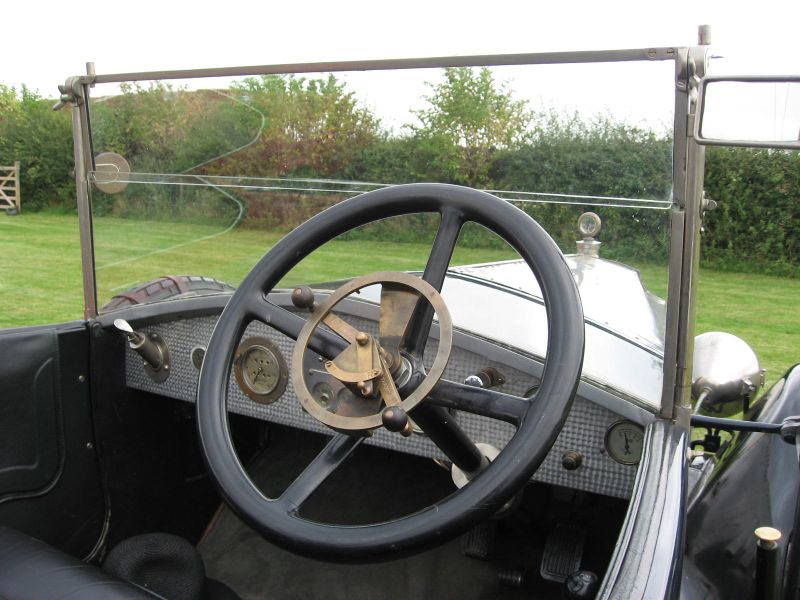

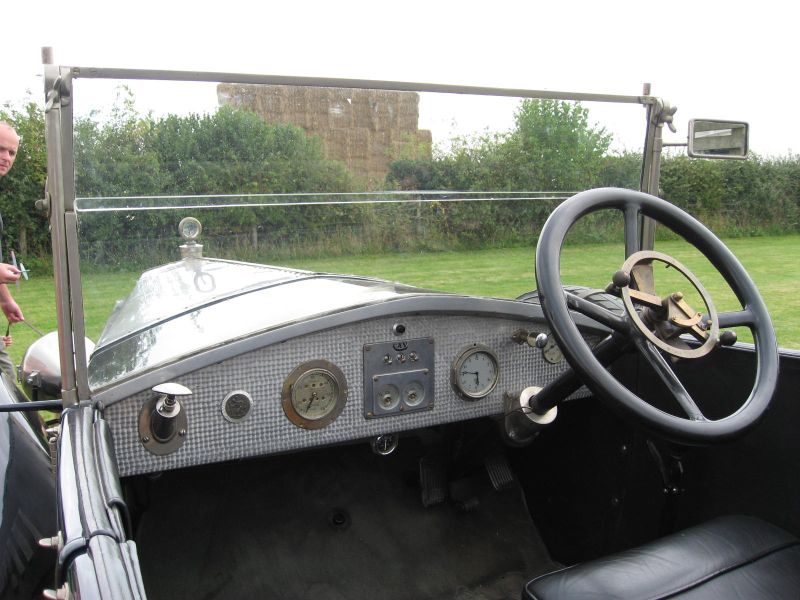

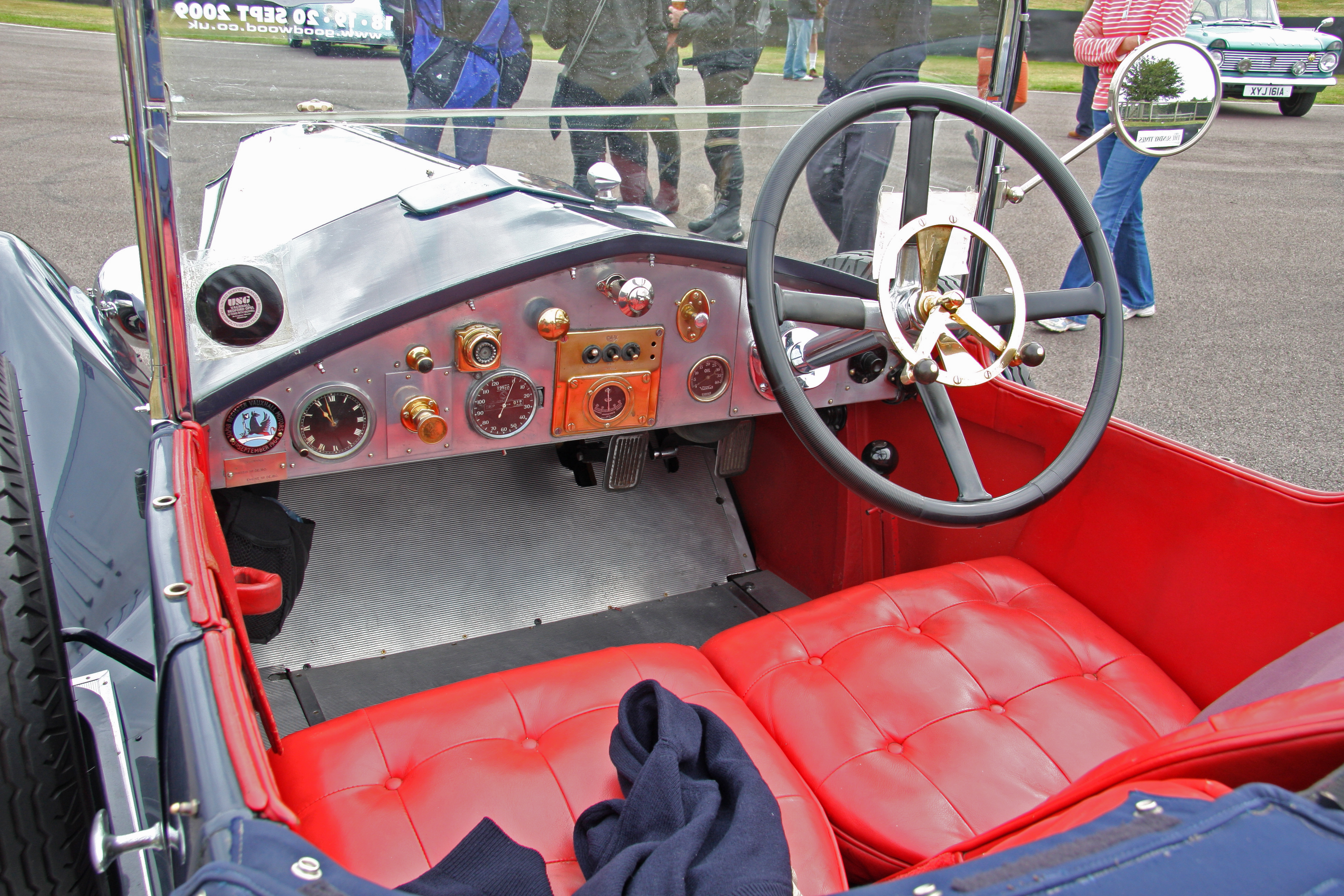
Accessorized

=== Catalogue March 1921 ===
Vauxhall Kington open car (tourer) was the company's leading line.
The following cars were available for early delivery:

Vauxhall built bodies

- £1,785 Cholmeley Cabriolet V-front fold-back roof 6 persons
- £1,660 Armidale limousine fixed roof 6 persons dark blue, grey cloth
- £1,760 Warwick landaulette semi fold-back roof 6-7 persons

Grosvenor Carriage Co bodies

- £1,528 Denbigh two-seater Cape cart hood
- £1,979 Pullman landaulette V-front semi fold-back roof, 6-7 persons, silk blinds, dictaphone etc.
- £1,735 Arundel cabriolet all weathers fold-back roof 4 persons
- £1,550 Malvern six-seater open car dark blue, grey cloth

Mulliner Northampton bodies

- £1,835 Domed roof saloon / limousine fixed roof 6-7 persons dark blue, cloth trim
- £1,800 saloon / limousine fixed roof 6-7 persons dark blue, grey cloth
