= Vauxhall Prince Henry =

Prince Henry Vauxhall C
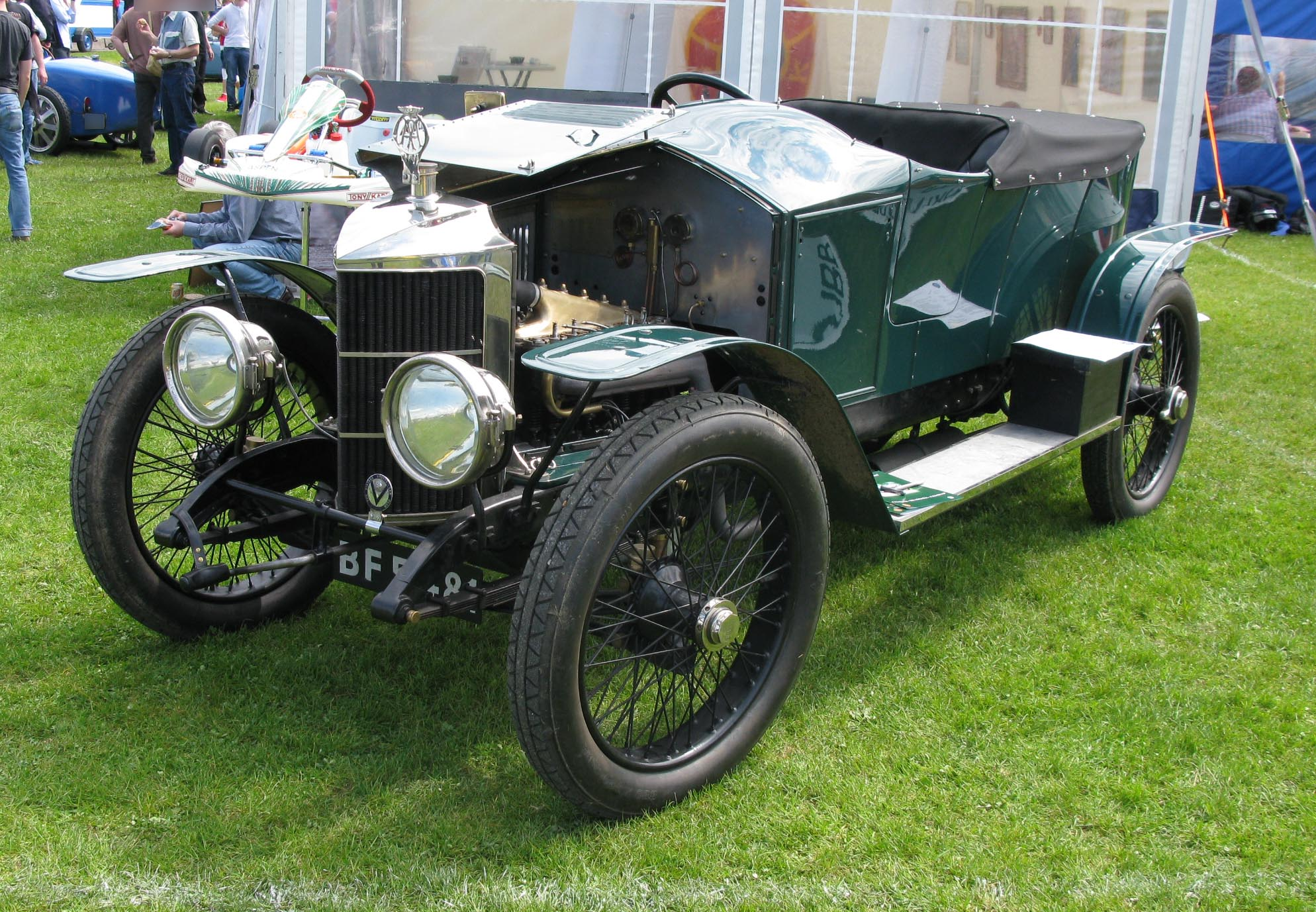
- Vauxhall Prince Henry (1912 example)

Overview
- Manufacturer: Vauxhall
- Production: 1911 – 1914
- Assembly: Luton
- Designer: Laurence Pomeroy

Body and chassis
- Class: Sports car
- Layout: FR layout

Powertrain
- Engine: I4; 1911—3 L (3,054 cc); 1913—4 L (3,969 cc)
- Transmission: four-speed sliding-pinion gearbox, live axle

Dimensions
- Wheelbase: 1911—117 in (2,972 mm); 1913—120 in (3,048 mm)
- Length: 1911—159 in (4,039 mm); 1913—162 in (4,115 mm) depends on body style
- Width: depends on body style
- Height: depends on body style
- Kerb weight: 1,250 kg (2,756 lb) depends on body

Chronology
- Predecessor: Vauxhall 20 hp
- Successor: Vauxhall 30-98

Prince Henry engine 20 and 24

Overview
- Manufacturer: Vauxhall

Layout
- Configuration: Straight 4-cylinder
- Displacement: 1911—3,054 cc (186 cu in); 1913—3,969 cc (242 cu in)
- Cylinder bore: 1911—90 mm (3.5 in); 1913—95 mm (3.7 in)
- Piston stroke: 1911—120 mm (4.7 in); 1913—140 mm (5.5 in)
- Cylinder block material: cast iron monobloc
- Cylinder head material: non-detachable L-head
- Valvetrain: mechanically operated, side by side. Side-valves operated by push rods from a camshaft low in the block

Combustion
- Fuel system: ignition by high-tension magneto single Zenith carburettor
- Fuel type: petrol
- Cooling system: Fan; Water pump driven by leather belt

Output
- Power output: 1911—60 bhp (45 kW; 61 PS) @2,800 rpm 1913—75 bhp (56 kW; 76 PS) maximum speed 2,500 r.p.m. Tax horsepower 1911— 20.09 ("20 hp"); 1913— 23.82 ("24 hp")

Chronology
- Predecessor: Vauxhall 20 hp
- Successor: 3-litre—none 4-litre—Vauxhall 30-98

The Vauxhall Prince Henry was a car manufactured by Vauxhall from 1911 to 1914. It had a length of around 159 inches (4.04 m) and a weight of 2,750 lb (1,250 kg) depending on the model and the coachwork fitted.

It is often thought of as the first sports car insofar as its high performance depends less on brute strength and more on overall excellence of design and sturdiness of construction.

== History ==
Known to Vauxhall as their C-10, three specially prepared cars were entered in the 1200 mile (1900 km) long 1910 Motor Trials named in honour of Prince Henry of Prussia. Replicas of the trial cars sold quickly and became known as Prince Henry Vauxhalls. Prince Henry cars also competed in other international trials including the 1911 St Petersburg to Sebastopol Trial and so two cars were sold to Tsar Nicholas II. A sales and support and distribution branch was opened in Moscow with good results. Hampered by the First World War the office was finally closed after the 1918 revolution.

The Prince Henry was a higher tuned version of the Vauxhall 20 hp that had been designed in the winter of 1907-08 by then draughtsman Laurence Pomeroy (1883–1941) when the company's chief engineer F. W. Hodges was away on holiday. The engine was of 4-cylinder monobloc design with side valves and a capacity of 3054 cc giving 40 bhp (30 kW) output. Three of these cars were entered in the RAC 2,000-mile (3,200 km) trial and one won the speed trials at Brooklands which was part of the event as well as winning the fuel economy award for its class. This victory helped Pomeroy to be promoted to Works Manager.

== C10 ==
With the decision to enter the Prince Henry Trial, the engine power was increased to 60 bhp (45 kW) at 2800 rpm and as a result of the success, replicas were put on the market at £580 with the chassis code C10 and known as the Prince Henry model.

Both Austro-Daimler and Vauxhall offered for sale replicas of their Prince Henry models at the 1911 Olympia Motor Show

In 1913 the engine capacity was increased to 3969 cc and the internal designation changed to C. Production continued until 1915.

Cars produced in 1914 have flutes in the bonnet that fade out a short way behind the radiator.

== Road test ==
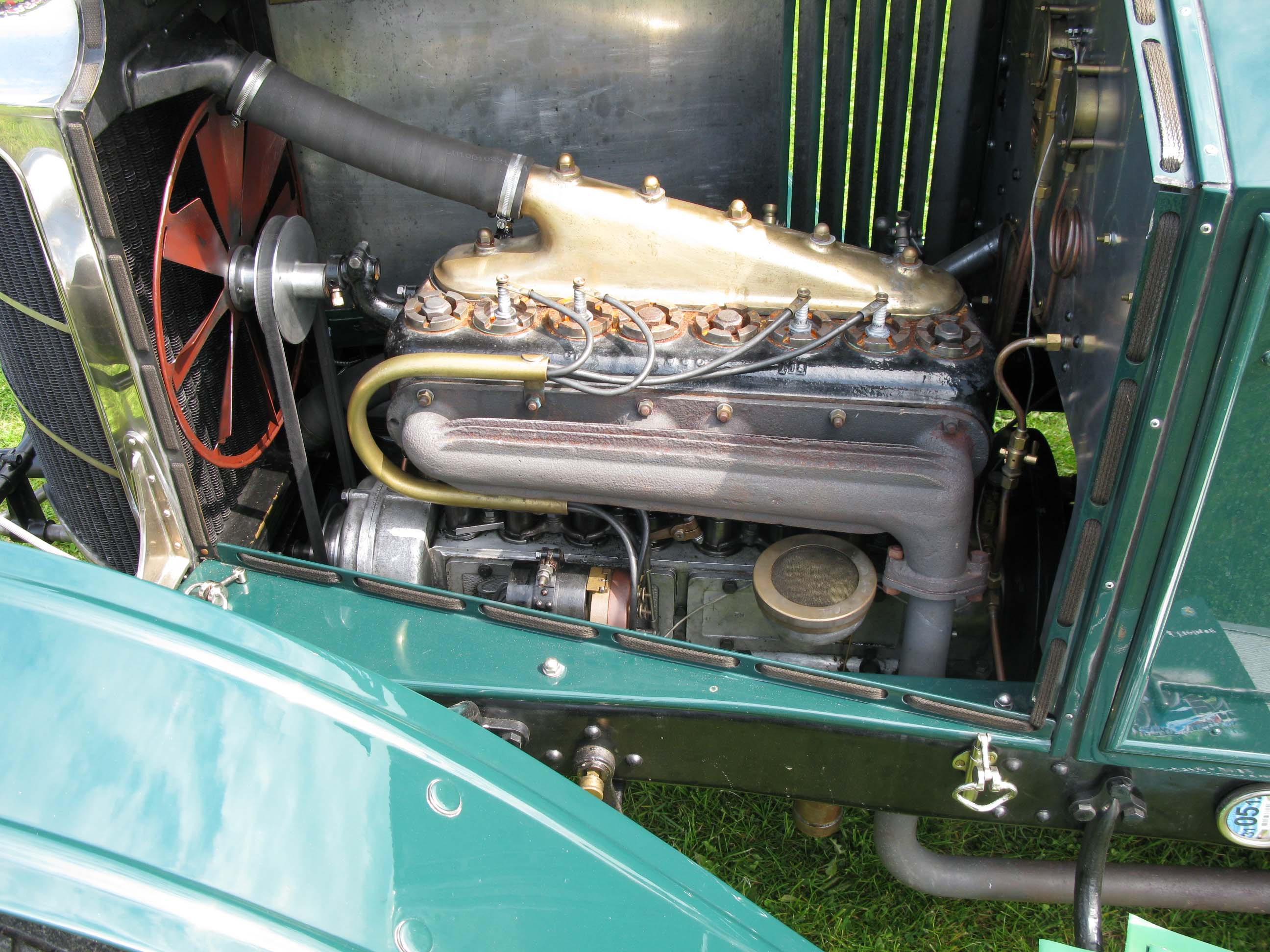

This 1914 car described below was very familiar to the writer who was a colleague and a close friend of its owner, Laurence Pomeroy junior, the designer's son. This car was owned from new by W T Badgery until bought in 1946 by L E W Pomeroy and it was later the property of Reg Long.

"A casual glance suggests its engine is a completely uninspired design, side valves along one side of the cylinders and the carburetter on the other but this simplicity makes it lighter than more complicated machinery, the chassis too with its 'wheel at each corner' and conventional semi-elliptic springs and light unsprung parts—the brake drums on the back axle are remarkably small."

"The driver immediately notices the heaviness of the flywheel. The clutch, a beautifully smooth Hele-Shaw multi-plate, hisses as it engages and the heavy flywheel gives the car a lumbering gait but then, and it is a shock, the engine shows it is longing to 'rev'. The gear-change is delightful and with each new higher gear the whole car seems to gather new life with a magnificent beat from the exhaust."

"The engine produces audible exhaust, tappet, and pinion noise during operation. The high seating position affects the driver's perception of speed. Despite its high and narrow chassis dimensions, the vehicle is designed for high average speeds and cornering stability through roundabouts."

"The brakes would probably not seem inadequate in the world of 1914. The foot brake operating on the transmission is exceedingly powerful but gets very hot and needs regular adjustment to maintain effectiveness. The handbrake on the rear wheels can be used for long descents but the drums are too small to provide dramatic stopping power. Front brakes would make a big difference but in 1914 front brakes were still the exception rather than the rule."

"The Prince Henry Vauxhall was not ahead of its time yet in spite of its heavy flywheel it is in all essentials a vintage car. It stands on the threshold of a new era and one can accurately describe it as the first of the vintage and the last of the veteran cars."
–Kent Karslake, 1956

== Name ==
"The evolution of this model has been interesting. In 1910 there was organised in Germany the event now famous as the Prince Henry Tour. Having an idea of opening an agency in Germany, the Vauxhall company thought that to enter for this competitive run would be useful to them. There were penalties for involuntary stops, as in most road trials, but there was also a speed test in which marks were awarded according to a figure of merit based upon a hypothetical relationship between car-speed and rated horse-power. It was obvious, however, that the big engine was in the most favourable position to win in the speed test, and hence, reliability being equal, to gain the premier award. Nevertheless, the Vauxhall people entered their 90 by 120 mm., engined model, doing all they knew to get the maximum power from it. Weight also being included in the formula, a lighter chassis was designed. Further, as the width and shape of the dashboard was virtually fixed by the regulations, a body was designed with a bulbous back to give a reasonable stream-line form, and to be consistent, the Prince Henry radiator and bonnet were adopted. This was one of the first cases of a British car having its bonnet merging into the scuttle without an intermediate no-man's land of exposed dashboard."

"Of the three Vauxhalls which ran in the Prince Henry Tour, two got full marks for reliability, and all did about 65 miles an hour in the speed trial, which was really quite good for that engine with a four-seated body and a full complement of passengers. So many people desired cars of this special type that in 1911 it was made a regular product of the Vauxhall works, and, during the last year or so a new style has sprung up. In this the engine dimensions are 95 by 140 mm., the old bore-stroke ratio having penalised the car under many hill-climbing formulae. All such formulae which do not involve the cubic capacity of the engine are by common acceptance considered advantageous to engines with small bore and long stroke. The chassis follows the lines of the original Prince Henry, but has rather a longer wheel base."
H. Massac Buist, March 1914.
