= Vauxhall 23-60 =

Vauxhall 23-60 OD
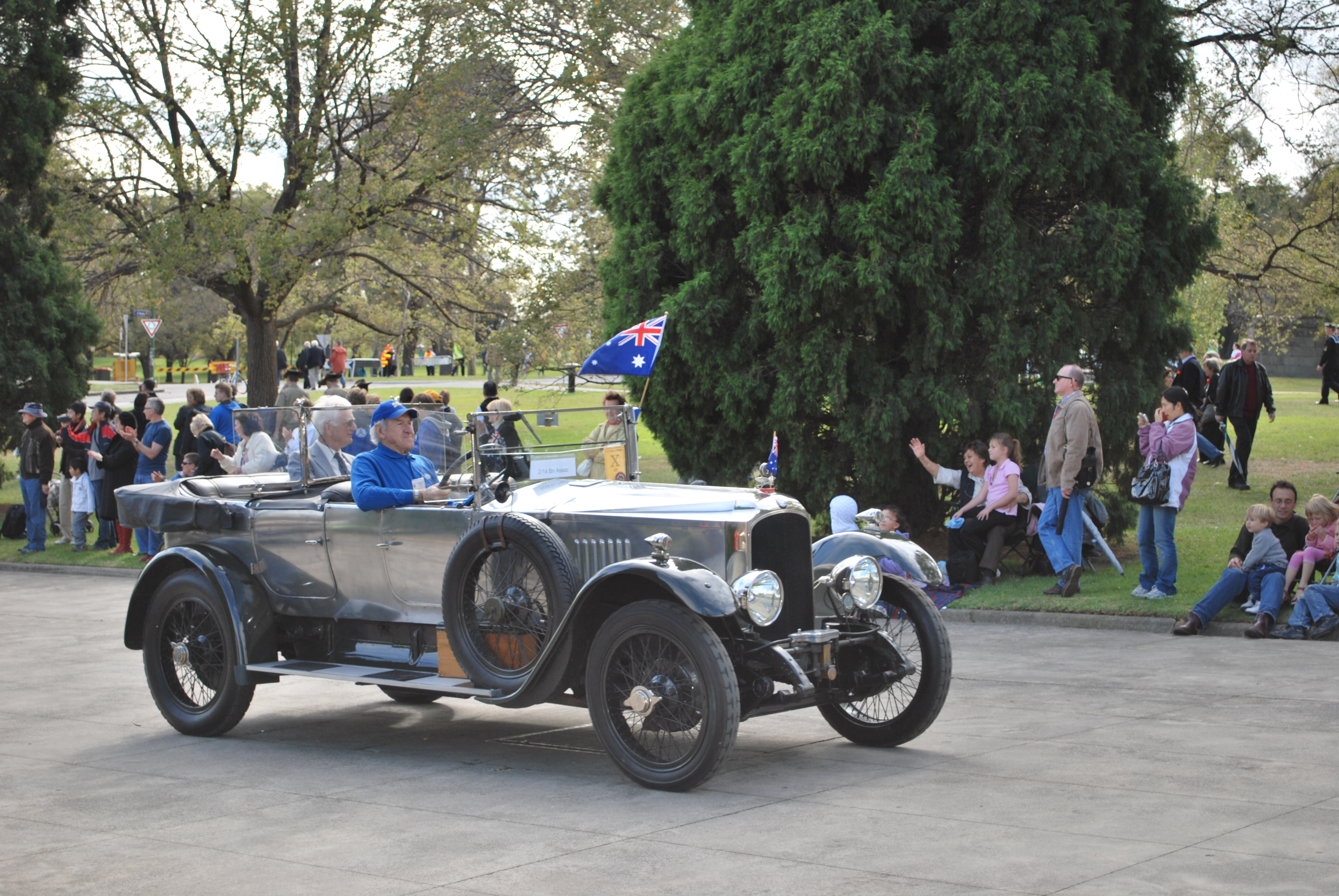
- Kington 5-seater tourer

Overview
- Manufacturer: Vauxhall
- Production: 1922–1925
- Model years: 1923–1925
- Assembly: Luton U.K.
- Designer: Charles Evelyn King

Body and chassis
- Class: medium
- Body style: Open 5 seater tourer 7-seater limousine 7-seater landaulette 7-seater cabriolet Chassis only also supplied
- Layout: Front-engine, rear-wheel-drive layout

Powertrain
- Engine: I4 242 cu in (3,969 cc)
- Transmission: multiplate clutch run with graphite coupled by a fabric joint to the 4-speed gearbox to the spiral-bevel driven rear axle located by torque girders

Dimensions
- Wheelbase: 10'10" 3,302.0 mm (130 in) track: 4'8" 1,422.4 mm (56 in)
- Length: and width and height depends on coachwork
- Kerb weight: 1,626 kg (3,584 lb)

Chronology
- Predecessor: Vauxhall 25
- Successor: Vauxhall 25-70

23-60 engine OD

Overview
- Manufacturer: Vauxhall

Layout
- Configuration: inline 4
- Displacement: 3,969 cc (242 cu in)
- Cylinder bore: 95 mm (3.7 in)
- Piston stroke: 140 mm (5.5 in)
- Cylinder block material: 4 cylinders, iron cast en bloc, crank-chamber is a separate alloy casting extended at either side to meet the sub-frame
- Cylinder head material: cast iron, demountable
- Valvetrain: overhead through push rods and rockers. the timing chain may be adjusted externally

Combustion
- Fuel system: Autovac, Triple diffuser Zenith carburettor, water-jacketted induction pipe
- Fuel type: petrol
- Cooling system: cooling by impellor, temperature thermostatically controlled

Output
- Power output: 60 bhp (45 kW; 61 PS) @ 2000 rpm Tax rating 22.4 h.p.

Chronology
- Predecessor: Vauxhall 25
- Successor: Vauxhall 25-70

The Vauxhall 23-60 is a four or five-seater touring car manufactured by Vauxhall of Luton that was announced in July 1922. The 23-60's standard tourer Kington body was described as "preserving that greyhound look so characteristic of the Vauxhall car". It shared many parts with Vauxhall's much more powerful 30-98.

The 23-60 replaced the Vauxhall 25 which had given sterling service during World War I and from which the 23-60 was developed. Its reliability made Vauxhall's name for dependability. The 23-60 remained in production until the introduction of the ultra-smooth six-cylinder Burt-McCollum type single-sleeve-valve Vauxhall 25-70 was announced in October 1925. General Motors took control of Vauxhall 16 November 1925.

== Design and specifications ==
=== Controls ===
The hand-operated gear and rear-wheel brake controls are on the driver's right but there is a door for the driver which there was not on the 30-98 or 25. The spark and throttle levers are on the steering wheel together with an air lever working a valve in the induction pipe (after the throttle). There is also a mixture control (choke) on the dash. Gear and brake levers are well to hand. Accelerator and (transmission) brake pedals were set close together.

The hood is of the all-weather type and its door sections are carried in an envelope stored behind the back squab.

Large tools are kept in the footrest and there is a specially fitted tool cupboard in the near-side running board.

=== Engine ===
The engine is essentially the four-cylinder engine of the preceding 25 hp car which chief engineer C E King had modified adding an overhead valve head and, because such largish engines now usually had six-cylinders for smoothness, the harmonic balancer invented by Dr F W Lanchester at the centre of its crankshaft.

The dynamo is driven from the clutch casing so it is generating while the engine is running. The nearside of the engine carries the generator and magneto, the carburettor and its water-heated induction pipe with a proper hot-spot and the vacuum tank on the dash. The offside of the engine has the starter, steering-box, exhaust manifold, oil-dipper gauge and oil filler. The water connection between the lower casting and the cylinder head is through large external aluminium ports so there is a single compression joint between castings.

==== Lanchester harmonic balancer ====
The Lanchester harmonic balancer on the crankshaft has two weighted drums driven at twice crankshaft speed, one by a helical gear wheel attached to the crankshaft and the other by the primary drum. In a four-cylinder engine unbalanced secondary forces occur twice in each crankshaft revolution. The harmonic balancer counteracts any tendency to undesirable vibration.

Few surviving cars retain the balancer.

=== Transmission ===
There is a right hand gear-change lever The clutch's thrust and withdrawal races are oiled by hand and it is necessary to unscrew the alloy front floorboards for access but the gearbox has a quickly detachable filler. The multiplate clutch is run with graphite and coupled by a fabric joint to the 4-speed gearbox then to the spiral-bevel driven rear axle located by torque girders

=== Chassis ===
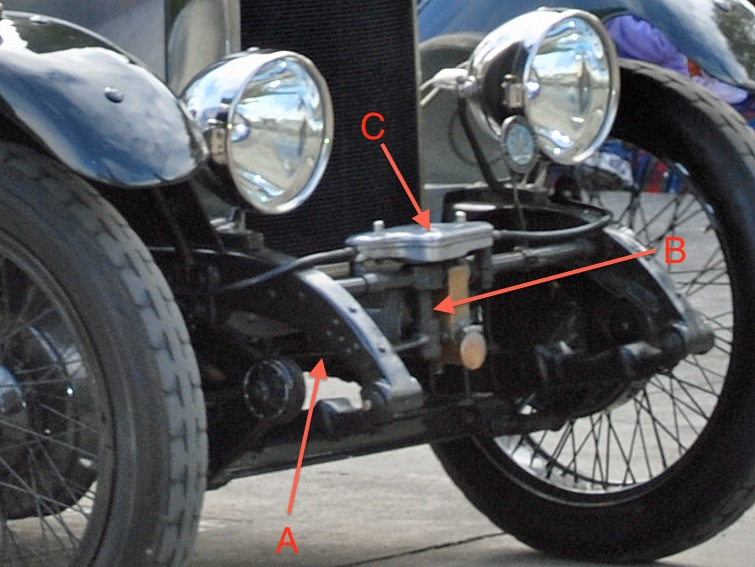
Front-wheel brakes for the 23-60 "Four-wheel braking with independent rear-wheel braking on a different set of drums." "The compensating or balancing mechanism of the Vauxhall front brakes is easily understood. A is the pedal brake-rod, which through the pin B turns or twists the cross-piece C, to which at opposite ends are attached the cables that work the brake shoes. The pin B, as it is free to incline slightly, finds the true centre immediately there is the slightest resistance, and thus the shoes on each side come into action simultaneously and with equal power."

The chassis with its mechanicals was guaranteed for three years.

==== Brakes ====
The foot brake operates on the transmission and the lever brakes on the rear wheels. Both sets are of the internal expanding type. The adjustment for wear of the foot brake may be made by hand but adjustment of the rear brakes requires a spanner.

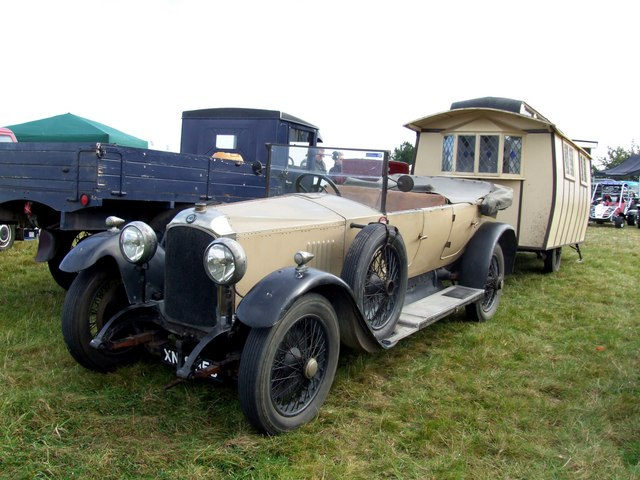
23-60 tourer briefly at rest first registered 25 May 1923

Twelve months later front brakes were made available on new cars for a further £55. A year later again they were standardised on the 23-60 in July 1924 along with a redesigned front axle, springs and saddle-plate. Operated by the foot pedal the front brakes and the transmission brake were linked, the latter being given a slight lead. The brakes on the rear wheels were independently controlled by the handbrake lever.

For more information on Vauxhall brakes performance see 30-98

==== Steering ====
Steering was by worm and wheel.

==== Suspension ====
By half-elliptical springs in front and behind.

== Catalogued bodies ==
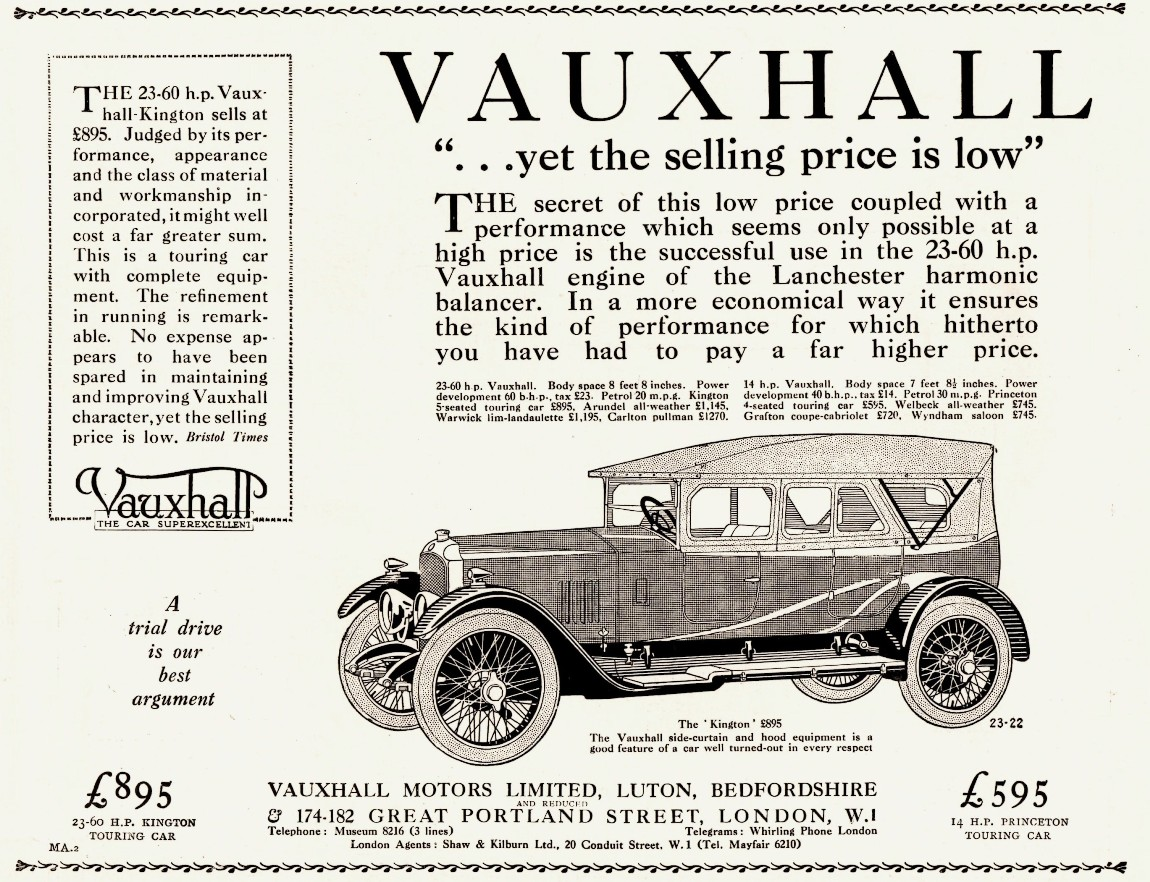

6 October 1922

- £695 Chassis with full equipment
- £895 Kington five-seater
- £1,145 Arundel all-weather
- £1,220 Salisbury limousine
- £1,270 Carlton pullman
- £1,195 Warwick landaulette
- £1,175 Grosvenor saloon
- £1,275 Winchester saloon
- £1,200 Sutherland cabriolet
- £1,300 Langham enclosed landaulette
