= Vauxhall 30-98 =

Vauxhall 30–98 E and OE
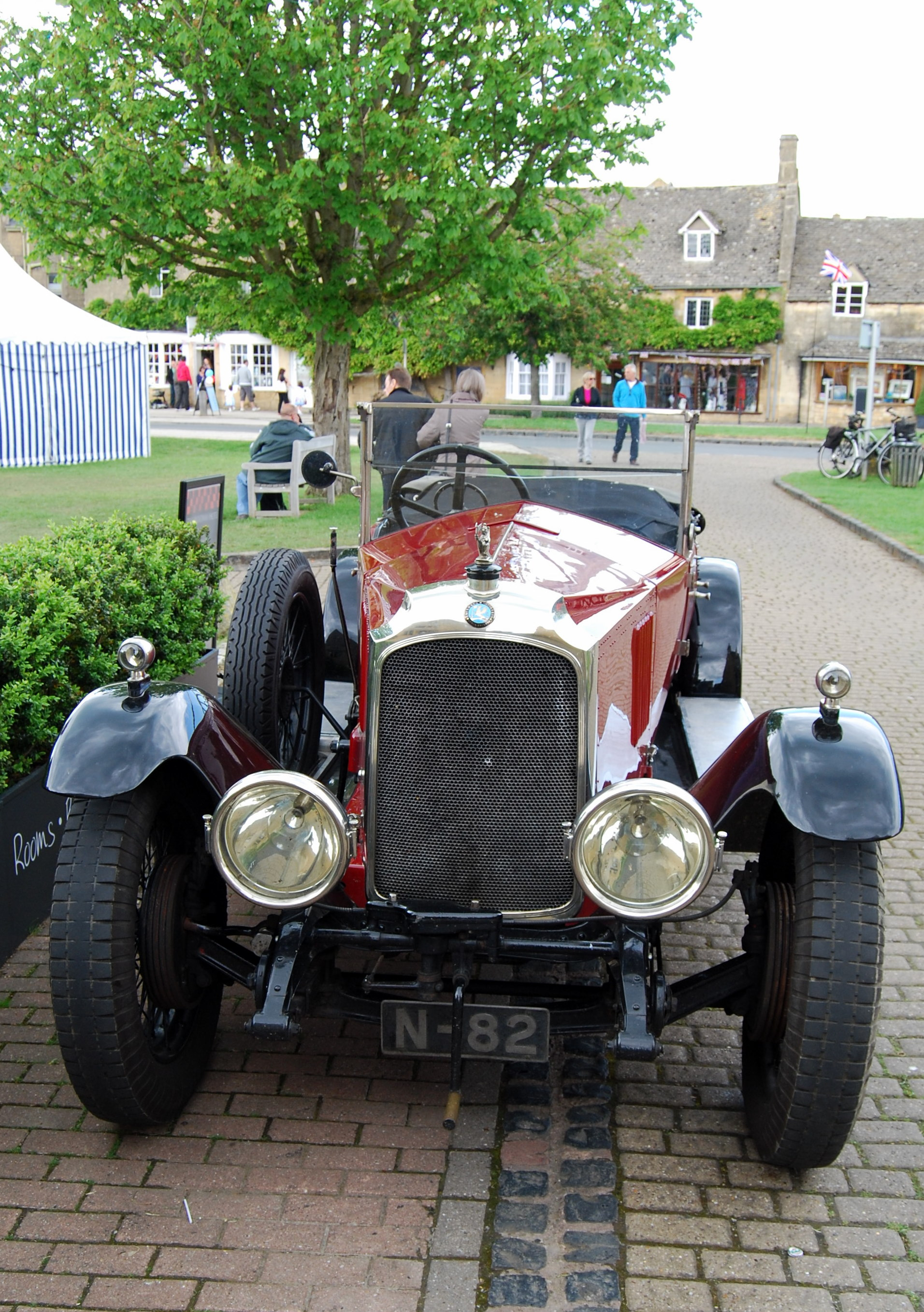
- 30–98 OE Velox tourer 1924

Overview
- Manufacturer: Vauxhall
- Production: 1913–15: 13 cars 1919–22: 261 cars 1922–27: 313 cars E — : 274 cars OE—: 313 cars
- Assembly: Luton
- Designer: Laurence Pomeroy

Body and chassis
- Body style: 4-seater Open tourer Closed coupé 2-seater Sports tourer chassis available for special bodies
- Layout: FR layout

Powertrain
- Engine: I4
- Transmission: E — multi-disc clutch, Hardy disc joint between clutch and gearbox, 4-speeds and reverse right-hand change gearbox, open propeller shaft, final drive by straight-cut bevel OE — as E but final drive by spiral bevel

Dimensions
- Wheelbase: E — 114 in (2,896 mm); OE — 118 in (2,997 mm); Track 54 in (1,372 mm)
- Kerb weight: Chassis only: 2,912 lb (1,321 kg); Velox tourer: 3,360 lb (1,520 kg); Weymann saloon: 3,472 lb (1,575 kg)

Chronology
- Predecessor: Vauxhall Prince Henry
- Successor: Vauxhall 20-60

The Vauxhall 30–98 is a car manufactured by Vauxhall at Luton, Bedfordshire from 1913 to 1927. In its day, its best-known configuration was the Vauxhall Velox (velox, veloc- being Latin for "swift"/"fleet" and the source of English velocity) standard 4-seater with open tourer body. Vauxhall's own description was "the 30–98 hp Vauxhall-Velox sporting car". The 30–98 is also known to enthusiasts by Vauxhall's chassis code E.

In 1995 it was authoritatively described as one of Britain's best-known sports cars and in the mid-20th century reported by Automobile Quarterly to be affectionately known as the last of the Edwardians and decreed as the first and perhaps the best British sports car.

== Origin ==
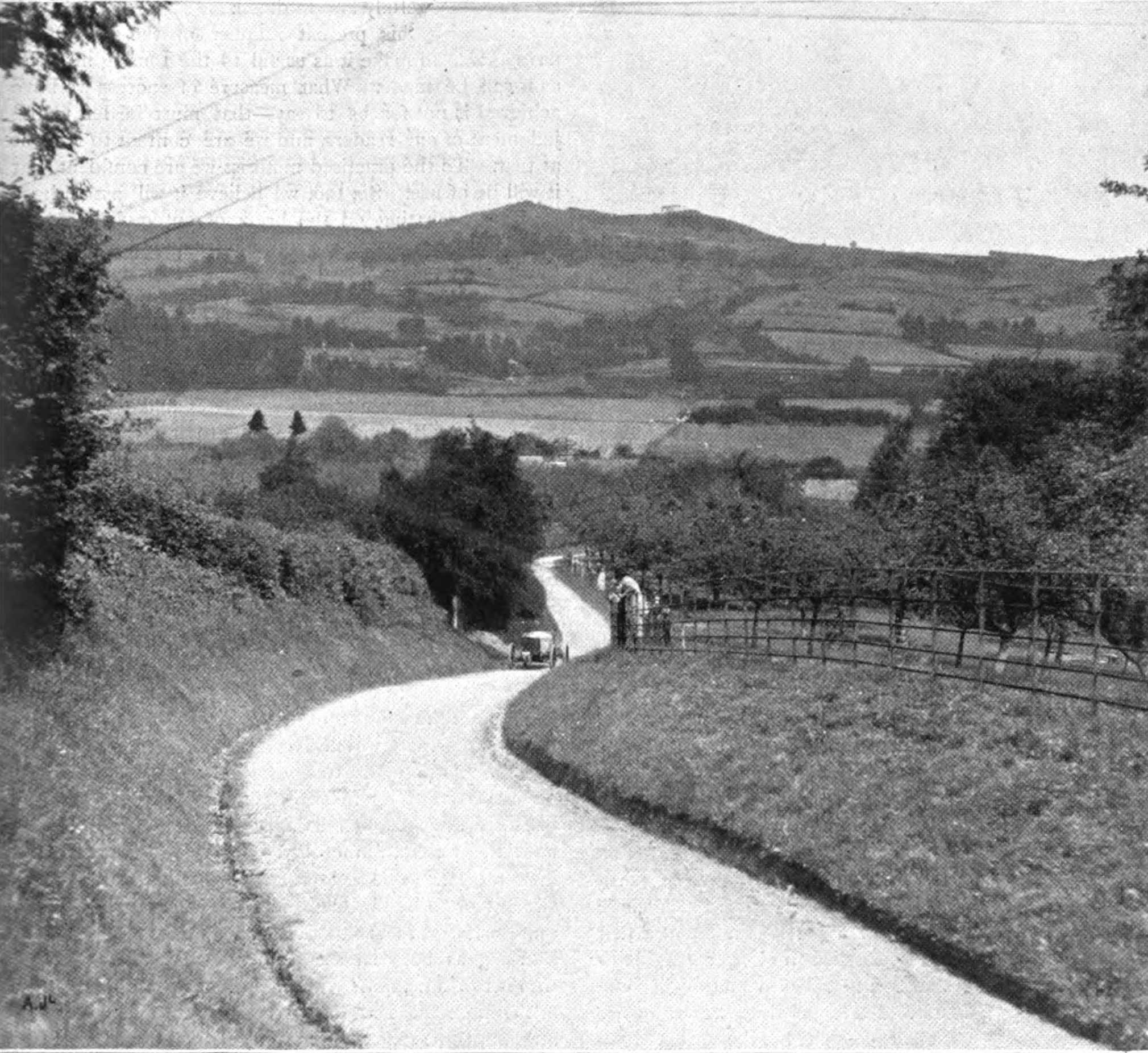
Higginson climbs Shelsley Walsh in the first 30–98, 7 June 1913

The first 30–98 was constructed at the behest of car dealer and motor sport competitor Joseph Higginson, inventor of the Autovac fuel lifter. He won the Shelsley Walsh hill-climb motoring competition on 7 June 1913 in his new Vauxhall, setting a hill record in the process, having in previous weeks made fastest time of the day at Waddington Pike (Note: "in a series of alarming slides" Then Pike, now Fell. A conical Peak is a Pike and also a Fell which is a hill or mountain) and Aston Clinton.

Although the 30-98 was designed as a fast touring car for long journeys, in racing trim the manufacturer guaranteed its ability to lap the Brooklands circuit at 100 mph (160 km/h). Some owners even insisted on watching their cars doing so before taking delivery.

The 30-98s used the Prince Henry chassis, they were distinguished by having more-or-less flat rather than V-shaped radiators. Laurence Pomeroy took the Prince Henry L-head side-valve engine, bored it out 3 mm, then cold-stretched the crankshaft throws 5 mm using a steam power hammer to lengthen the stroke. (Note: The cold stretching of production crankshafts is disputed) The camshaft was given a new chain drive at the front of the engine, high lift cams and new tappet clearances. The Prince Henry chassis was slightly modified and the whole given a narrow alloy four-seater body, a pair of alloy wings (front mudguards) and no doors.

Before war intervened only 13 30-98s were made and they were for selected drivers, the last in 1915 (Note: This 4½-litre car was delivered in March 1915. It had a lengthened chassis with the cantilever rear springs of the 1914 GP Vauxhalls and seated four people, two more behind a separate windscreen at the rear. The car would exceed 90 mph on the road. Kent Karslake, Laurence Pomeroy, From Veteran to Vintage, Temple Press, London, 1956) for Percy Kidner a joint managing director (CEO) of Vauxhall. Actual production began in 1919.

The 30–98 name is believed to have been coined because the car had an output of 30 bhp (22 kW) at 1,000 rpm and 98 bhp (73 kW) at 3,000 rpm but another explanation is that it had an RAC horsepower rating of 30 and a cylinder bore of 98 mm though perhaps the most likely of all is that there was then a popular but heavier slower Mercedes 38/90. However it was found, the name 30–98 looked and sounded so well.

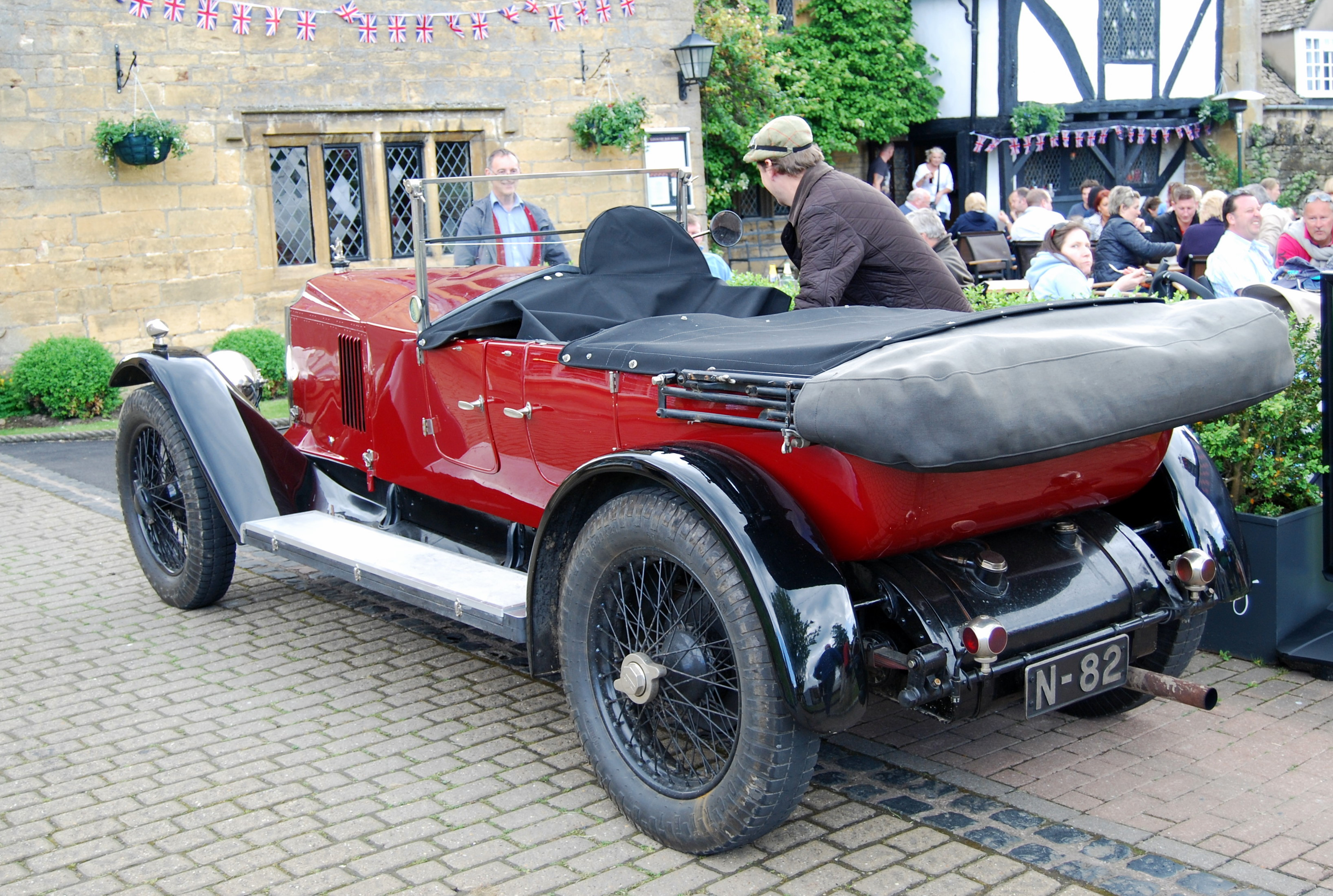
30–98 OE Velox tourer

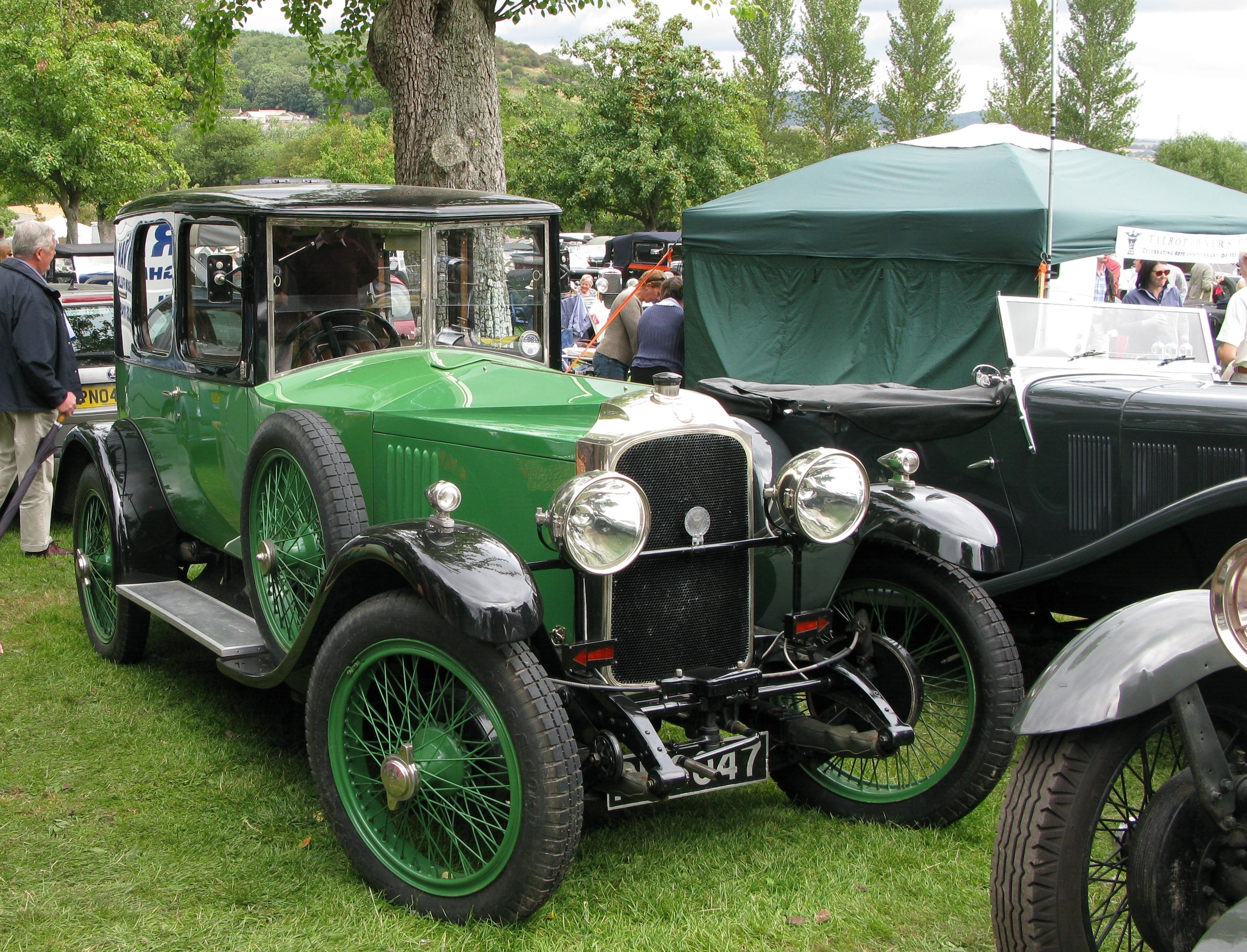
30–98 Clinton 2-door 4-light saloon (replica body)

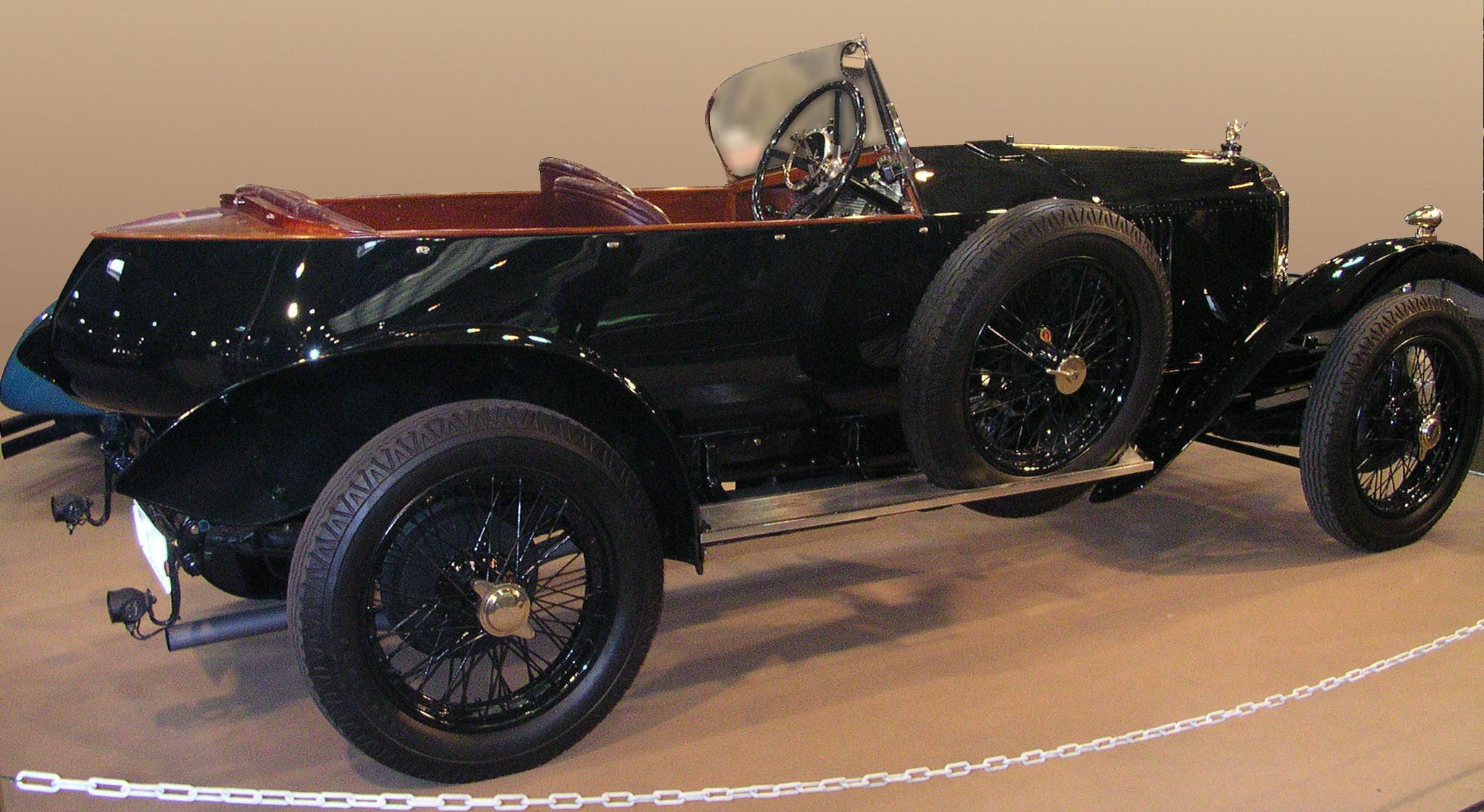
Wensum "The white four-seater shown on Stand 140 had been at Wembley and I believe was sold soon after the Show opened on Friday last. It is a new body of ultra-sporting style. Modelled on the lines of a yacht, it is graceful in appearance and has symmetrical balance. One of these cars was awarded the first prize in its class in the recent Boulogne Concours d'Élégance"

== Specifications ==
=== Inclusive items and options supplied by the factory ===
When production began in 1919 an electric starter would be supplied for an extra £50 though it was standard on Vauxhall's 25 hp car. But Vauxhall made no separate charge for: electric lighting, a clock, speedometer, spare wheel and tyre, full tool kit and number plates. Customers could choose between a bonnet of plain polished aluminium or have it painted to match the rest of the car. Advertisements for the OE when introduced in 1922 noted the electric lighting now included six lamps, an instrument board lamp and gauges together with both an electric horn and a bulb horn. By 1927 the advertised equipment was limited to: bucket-shaped front seats adjustable for leg room; wire wheels and Dunlop cord tyres, two spare wheels and tyres; spring gaiters; luggage grid and windscreen wiper (singular).

=== Body ===
==== Velox ====
The Vauxhall-built Velox four-seater tourer body was the standard coachwork. Though it was light and its appearance elegant, slim and low-sided the lightness meant little comfort in the back seats and the sides were so low "rear passengers might have been warned that they were travelling at their own risk".

The 1920 catalogue included a Vauxhall Velox featherweight coupé to seat two in the interior and with chauffeur's dicky seat, electric lamp in roof and V-shaped windscreen. Though of extremely light construction the wood frame on which the metal panels are laid are contrived to give sufficient strength. The featherweight Velox coupé displayed at the (Scottish) Motor Show painted dark blue below "water line" and black above had nickel fittings and a polished aluminium bonnet and a walnut instrument panel with companion lockers. The coupé was upholstered in blue Morocco leather with head lining, carpet, silk cords and laces to match. There were also blinds of a lighter blue silk with tassels. These were special body fittings for the cars in the show and not provided within the advertised price.

==== Wensum ====
There was a mid-twenties fashion for car bodies styled on the lines of motorboats. Described in its advertisement as "an ultra-sporting body" a factory-built boat-tailed open two or three-seater with flared wings called the Wensum was introduced at extra cost in 1924. The third seat really was "for decoration". Works driver, by then works manager, A J Hancock kept a fast motorboat on the River Wensum which has a popular yachting stretch near Norwich.

These bodies were not built on the same production line as the Velox.

A chassis was available for customers who wanted their own special bodies.

=== Engine ===
E and OE engines
- E sidevalve engine in a 1920 30-98

Overview
- Manufacturer: Vauxhall Motors Limited
- Production: as cars

Layout
- Configuration: Straight 4-cylinder
- Displacement: E — 4,525 cc (276 cu in); OE—4,225 cc (258 cu in)
- Cylinder bore: 98 mm (3.9 in)
- Piston stroke: E — 150 mm (5.9 in); OE—140 mm (5.5 in) die-cast aluminium pistons; duralumin connecting rods
- Cylinder block material: E — cast iron monobloc OE—cast iron, separate cast iron head
- Cylinder head material: E — non-detachable L-head; OE—detachable, cast iron, OHV (with manifolds in place and without disturbing valve gear)
- Valvetrain: E — Side-valves operated by push rods from a camshaft low in the block OE—Overhead valves operated by duralumin push-rods and rockers; valves have double springs; timing by chain externally adjustable

Combustion
- Fuel system: single Zenith carburettor, petrol feed by air pressure, later by Autovac, ignition by magneto three-branch inlet manifold, four-branch exhaust manifold OE — two-branch inlet manifold with water-jacket in centre
- Cooling system: Fan mounted behind the radiator with its spindle linked to a water impeller OE — 2-valve thermostatic control of circulation

Output
- Power output: E — 90 bhp (67 kW; 91 PS) @3,000 rpm OE—112 bhp (84 kW; 114 PS) @3,300 rpm later — 120 bhp (89 kW; 120 PS); Tax horsepower 23.82; Designers; E — Laurence Pomeroy; OE—Clarence Evelyn King

Chronology
- Predecessor: Prince Henry
- Successor: none

==== E ====
The engine was a development of the four-cylinder monobloc fixed cylinder head, push rod operated, L-head side-valve engine of the Prince Henry but enlarged to 4,525 cc by increasing the stroke from 140 to 150 mm. The new crankshaft ran in five bearings with pressure fed lubrication. A single Zenith carburettor was fitted. The engine's power output was 90 bhp (67 kW) at 3,000 rpm.

- Production quantity: 274

==== OE ====
In November 1922 it was announced the engine was updated, fitted with overhead valves and detachable cylinder head and renamed OE. The stroke was returned to its original length which gave a slightly smaller capacity of 4,224 cc but power output was up nearly 30% from the original to 115 bhp (86 kW) at 3,300 rpm. Low speed torque was also improved. The car and its wheelbase were lengthened four inches and widened three inches making more room for passengers and more comfortable seating.

- Production quantity: 313

=== Chassis ===
The engine was carried in a separate subframe on the ladder type chassis with semi-elliptic leaf springs, a live rear axle of orthodox design and shock absorbers front and rear. A four-speed gearbox with right hand change was fitted driving the rear wheels through a 3.08:1 straight cut bevel rear axle.

For 1923 with the OE engine the straight cut back axle gear was replaced by a spiral bevel with a higher 3.3:1 reduction ratio. The chassis and wheelbase were lengthened four inches and the chassis was also strengthened by widening the cross-section of the side rails. The body was widened three inches. Rear axle torque was now taken through a banjo-shaped torque arm alongside the propeller shaft.

==== Steering ====
Steering is by worm and complete wheel with a taper and splined drop-arm connection.

==== Vauxhall brakes ====
On 30-98s braking was a mechanical system with the pedal operating a transmission brake. The brakes on the rear wheels were controlled by a large lever (handbrake). Front-wheel brakes became available in late 1923, at first operated by Bowden double-cable but hydraulically from 1926.

Brake drums were steel with a riveted cast iron liner. On some cars the drums were finned alloy again with a riveted cast iron liner. The final batch of cars used the 23–60 components and the front drums were very large, again with fins.

The transmission brake—given a slight lead when front brakes were fitted—in a drum behind the gearbox might have been adequate but it was usually full of oil that had leaked from the rear bearing. Then pressure on the pedal just produced a bad smell. A driver with the necessary skills—good hands and an understanding of the effects of the handbrake—could corner fast. Handbrake turns were available in wet weather. "In an emergency, however, braking was a waste of time, the driver must steer, change gear, jump out or pray—perhaps in that order."

With the OE the three brake drums were switched to steel-lined aluminium drums well ribbed for cooling and linings were by Ferodo. In 1923 a year after the OE's introduction mechanically operated front brakes were added and linked to the pedal which still operated the transmission brake. In 1927 they were replaced by a notoriously temperamental hydraulic system from the pedal to the transmission and, again, just the front wheels.

The hydraulic system introduced in 1927. Back brakes, expanding shoes in enclosed drums, are applied by rods from the hand lever outside the body on the off-side (to the driver's right). Four-wheel brakes actuated by the pedal through a master-plunger operate on the front wheels and on (the back wheels through) the transmission just behind the gearbox. On the front wheels the brakes expand internally within big ribbed enclosed drums and on the transmission the brake contracts. Operation is hydraulic, the transmission brake by having smaller pistons receives only a third of the force. The system is self-adjusting and self-compensating. Equalisation is ensured by the sizes of the plungers. Automatic adjustment is made by the action of a friction ring fitted in a recess in the plunger of the operating system. The front brakes are operated by a quick-thread screw formed by steel balls in grooves. The leading shoe in each wheel is arranged to come on slightly earlier and to release a shade before the other.

On the off-side of the dash, under the bonnet, there is a pressurised oil reservoir maintained at about 7 lbs per sq. in. to prevent air getting into the system. A spare half-gallon of the special mixture was part of the equipment.

==== Suspension ====
Spring on the front right wheel of a 1920 30-98

The springs front and back are half elliptical. Behind they are set above the axle with swivel anchorages on the axle sleeves. The forward springs are almost flat-set and they have snubber leaves. There are shock absorbers in front and behind.

== Road test opinions ==
"A power of acceleration, amazingly swift and smooth, yet perfectly controlled... the thrilling characteristics of a racer in a machine tamed to behave in mannerly fashion... the engine which gives 100 brake horse power on the bench and which will propel the car at over 80 miles an hour on the level can be throttled down until the vehicle is running smoothly at 12–15 miles an hour." "It is certainly the greediest motor of the touring type that I have driven. I do not mean in petrol but in a straining desire to be allowed to go ever faster."

"A rapid double-clutch at 50 or even over can be made without a sound, and away she romps with a slight bark of joy on third ... The price of the 30–98, so demurely described in the catalogue as a fast touring car, is £1,220".

== Owner's opinion ==
"in spite of my eighteen years experience, I only began to motor in reality since I purchased my 30–98." Quoted by writer Beverly R Kimes in Automobile Quarterly.

== Pricing ==
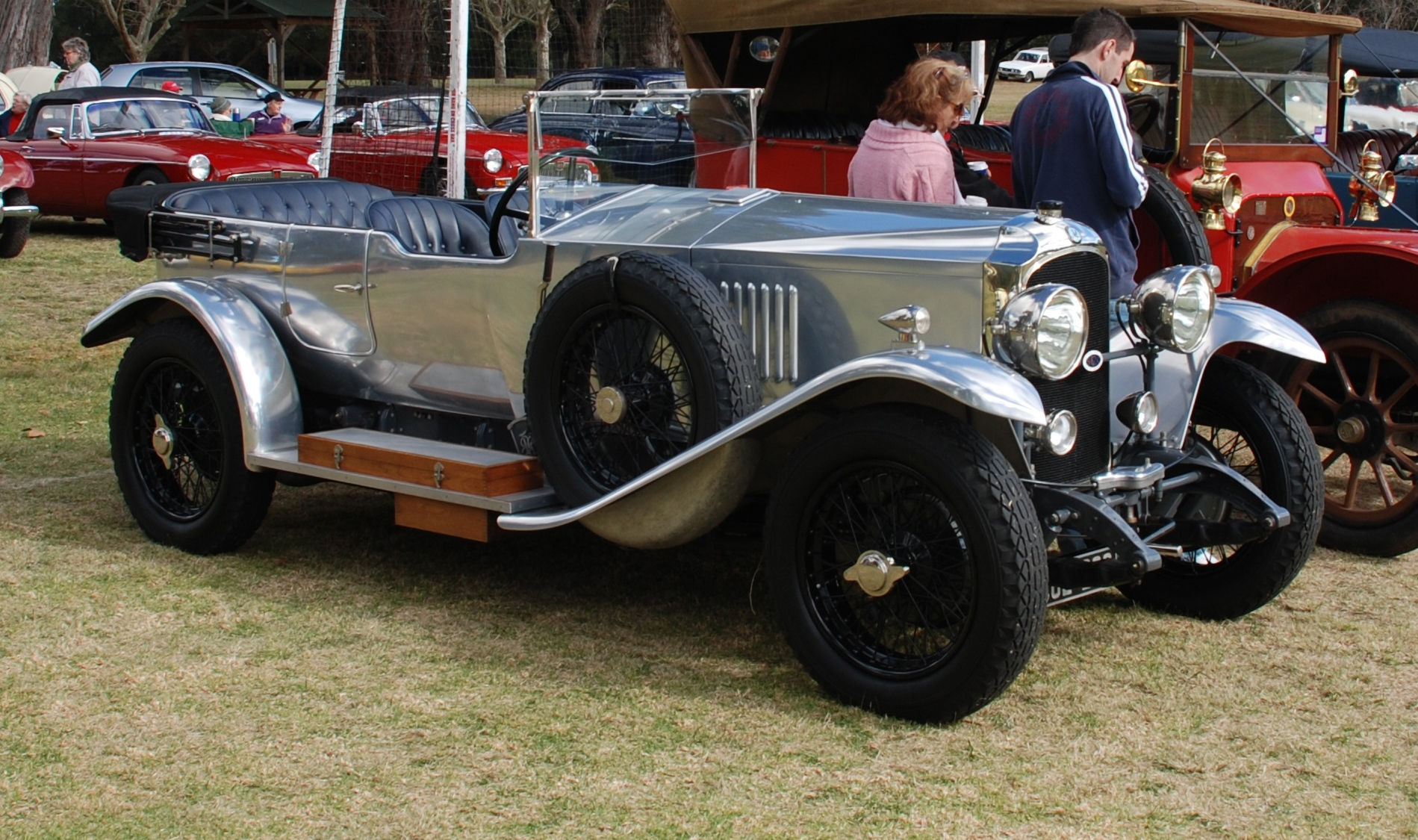
1926 Vauxhall 30–98 with polished aluminium 'Velox' body

Chassis only

- 1919 £1,125
- 1920 £1,275
- 1921 £950 reduced following the slump in demand for all cars
- 1924 £950

With the Velox body:

- 1919 £1,475
- 1920 £1,676
- 1921 £1,300 reduced following the slump in demand for all cars
- 1924 £1,220

When Rolls-Royce announced their new 20 hp car (30–98 rated at 23.8 hp) in December 1922 its prices were:

- chassis only £1,100
- with the most popular (open tourer) body total cost was around £1600

The first General Motors Vauxhall Cadet, a 4-door 2-litre 6-cylinder saloon, was priced at £280 in 1930, up to a decade later.

== Motor sport ==
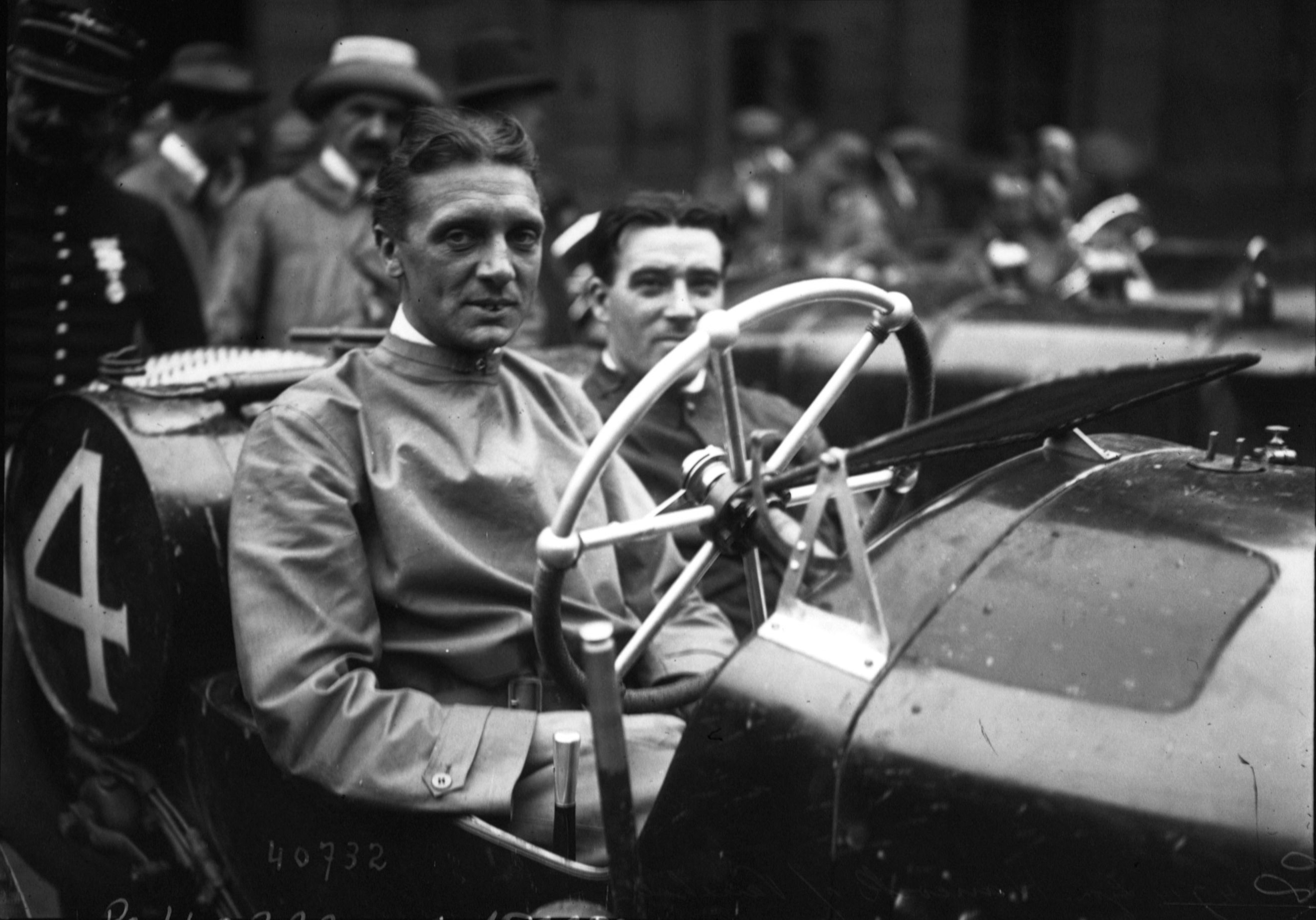
John Hancock of the Vauxhall team at the French Grand Prix in Lyons, 4 July 1914

By 1920 the 30–98 had built itself an enduring reputation in racing as well as on the road. Later, with the OE engine, Vauxhall would guarantee that a car stripped down for competition would be able to attain a top speed of 100 mph (160 km/h)

After the war, 30-98s were never raced by the factory, which had no significant competition department, but they were campaigned successfully by private owners. Rather than following the frequent pre-1914 pattern of ever larger engines for competition results, its success depended less on brute strength (size of engine—and that was always 4 cylinders) and more on overall excellence of design and sturdiness of construction.

== Final production run ==
The last cars were made in 1927 and these engines were given a balanced crankshaft allowing them to be tuned to 120 bhp (89 kW) at 3,500 rpm. They also had a closer ratio gearbox.
