= Vauxhall A-Type =

Vauxhall 20, 22 and 16-20 A
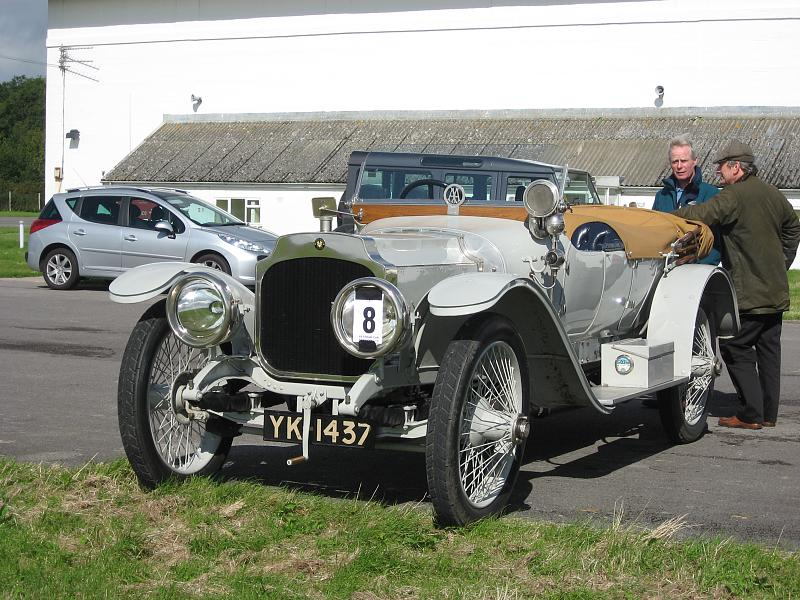
- Vauxhall A12 3½-litre, "22 hp", 1912

Overview
- Manufacturer: Vauxhall
- Production: October 1908 to 1915
- Assembly: Luton, Bedfordshire, England
- Designer: Laurence Pomeroy

Powertrain
- Engine: 4-cylinder inline 3,054 cc (186 cu in); 3,402 cc (208 cu in)
- Transmission: manual: 4-speed and reverse (some early cars 3 speed) clutch: early cars— cone later cars— multi-plate in graphite

Dimensions
- Wheelbase: 2,921.0 mm (115 in); 3,124.2 mm (123 in)
- Length: all dimensions depend on coachwork
- Kerb weight: depends on coachwork

Vauxhall 20 and 22 A

Overview
- Manufacturer: Vauxhall

Layout
- Configuration: in-line 4-cylinder
- Displacement: 3054 c.c. (3½-litre 3402 cc)
- Cylinder bore: 90mm (3½-litre 95mm)
- Piston stroke: 120mm
- Cylinder block material: Sheet copper sump in very early cars, later cast alloy
- Valvetrain: camshaft gear-driven until 16-20 was driven by chain

Combustion
- Fuel system: Carburettors: White & Poppe; Zenith; Claudel Hobson gravity or forced feed
- Fuel type: petrol
- Cooling system: thermo syphon

Output
- Power output: 1909 38 bhp (28 kW; 39 PS); 1910 60 bhp (45 kW; 61 PS); 1913 80 bhp (60 kW; 81 PS) tax horsepower: 3054cc 20.09hp 3402cc 22.38hp

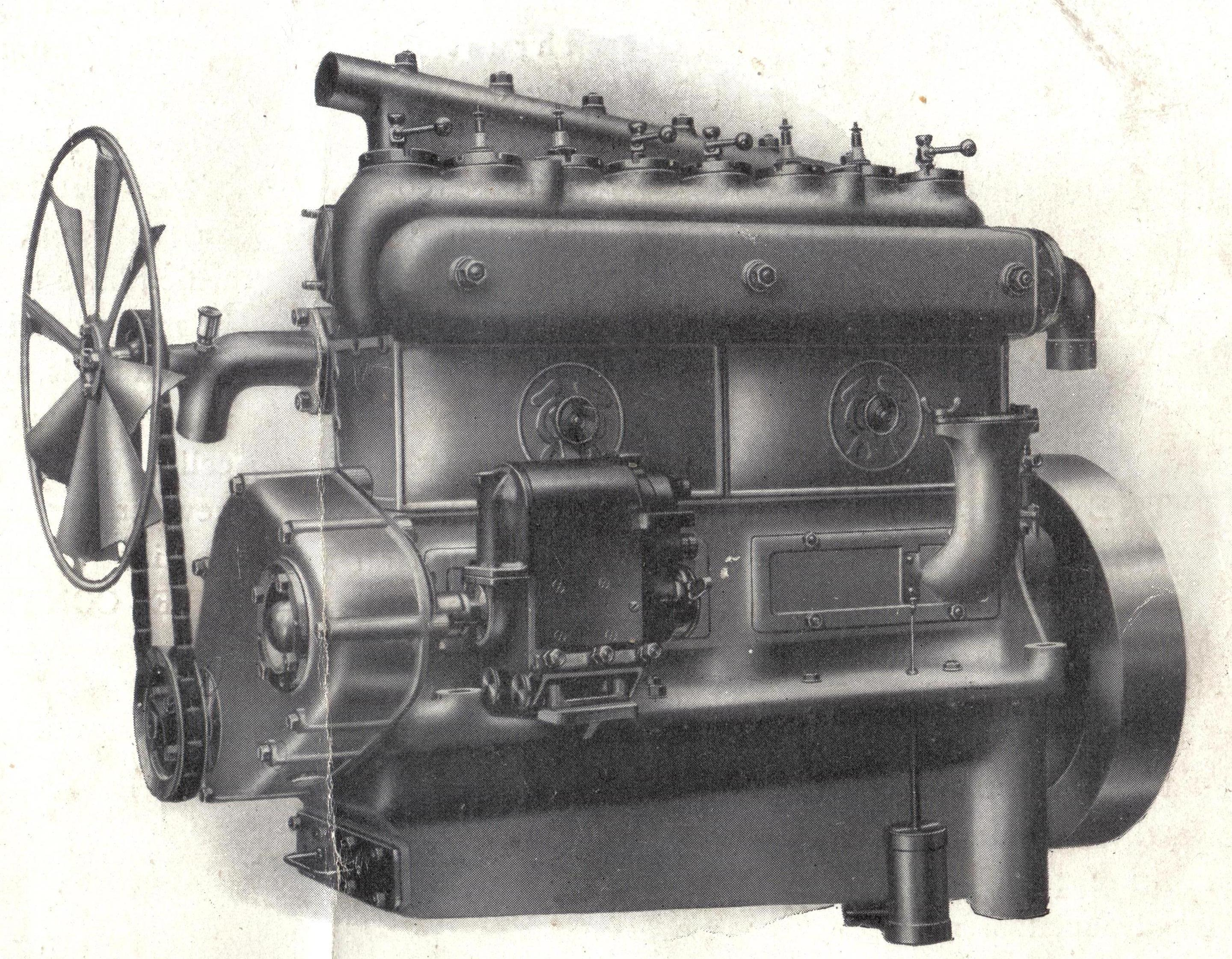
Early 16-20 engine

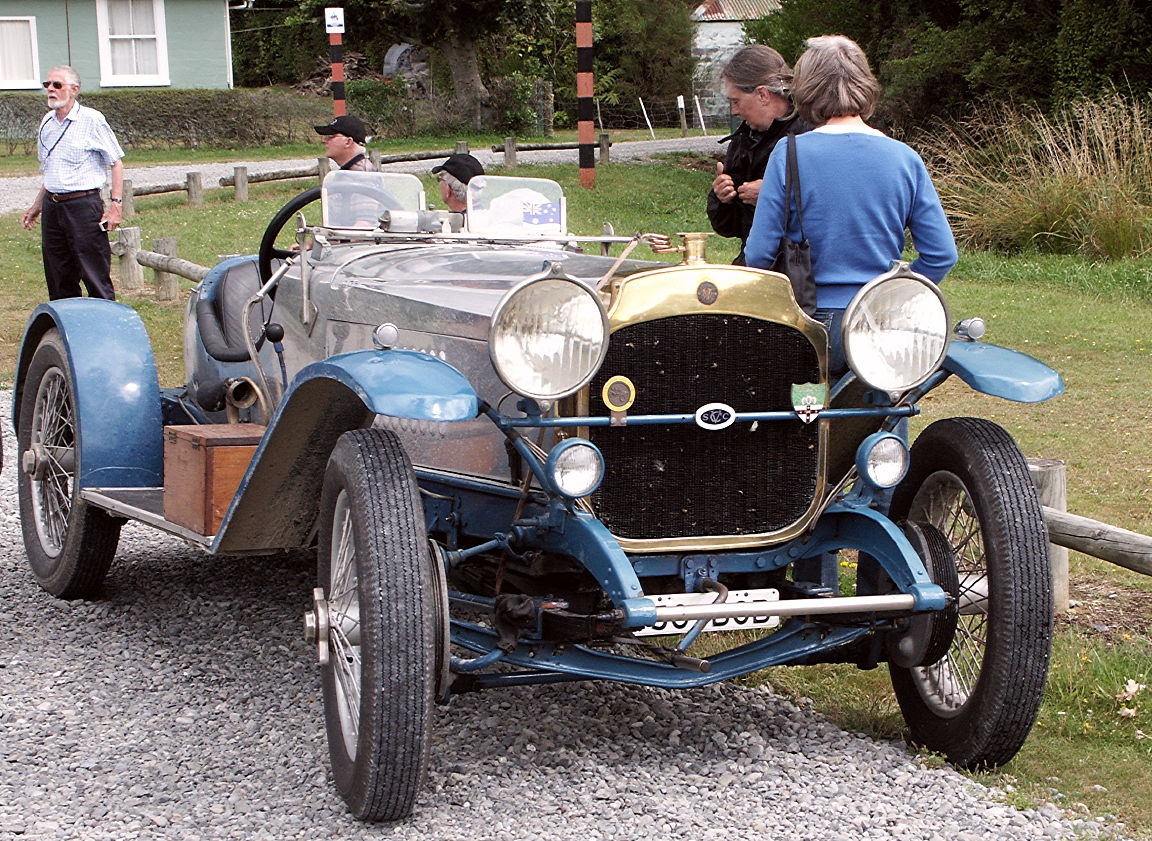
16-20 h.p. 1914

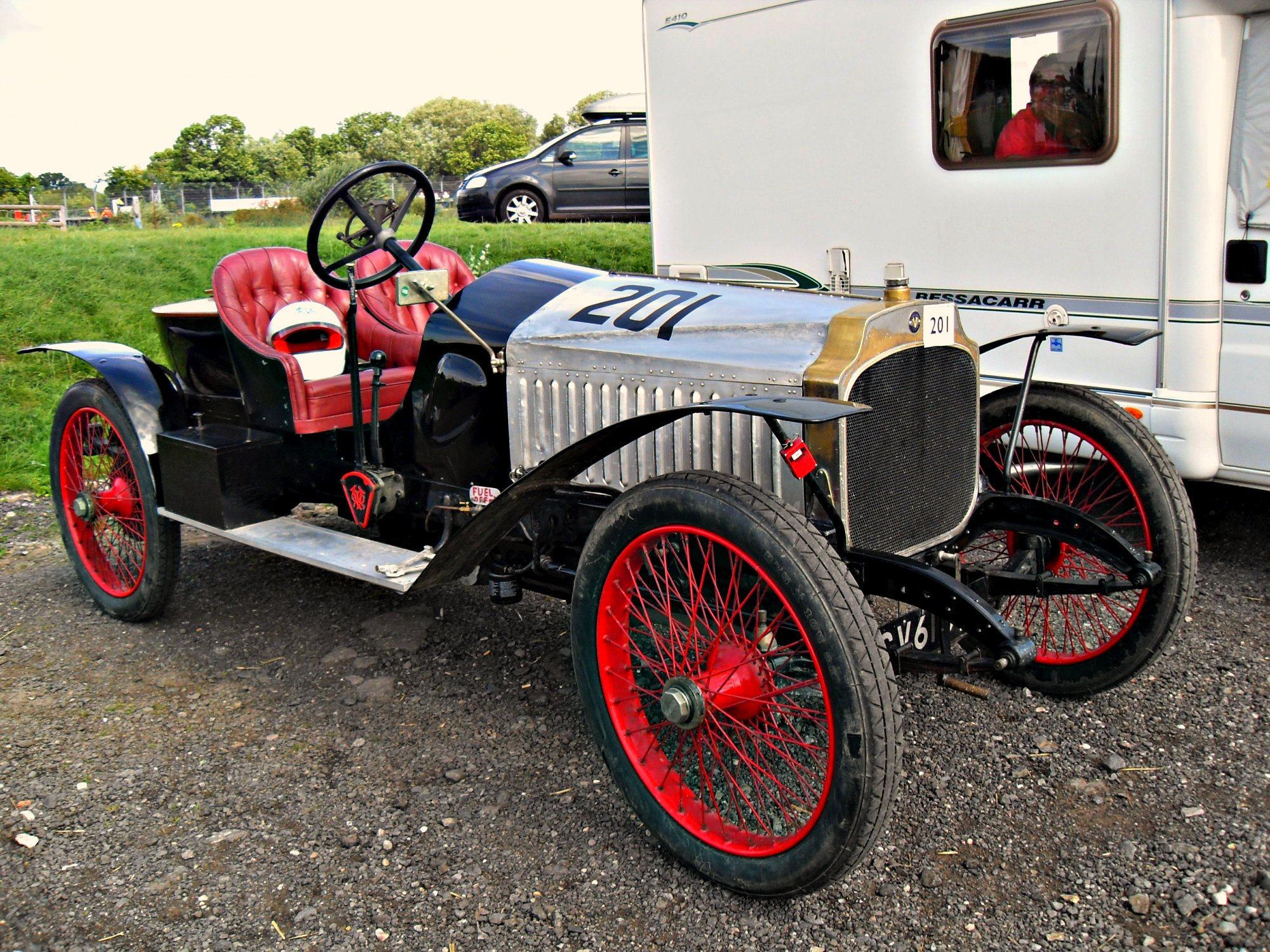
16-20 h.p. 1914 with racing body

The Vauxhall A-type, was a four-cylinder medium-sized car manufactured by Vauxhall from 1908 to 1914. It was the first production Vauxhall designed by Laurence Pomeroy. Production was mostly the 3-litre version, producing either 38 bhp in the earlier models, or 60 bhp later, but both identified as "20hp" for the tax horsepower rating. There were also a small number with 3.5 litre engines (22 tax horsepower). It became a highly acclaimed 3 litre of its day and at Brooklands on 26 October 1910 it became the first 20 hp car to exceed 100 mph (160 km/h).

== Genesis ==
Laurence Pomeroy had joined Vauxhall in 1907 as an assistant draughtsman at the age of twenty-two. He first made his mark at the 1908 RAC and Scottish Reliability Trial, held in June of that year. His first prototype, a development of Vauxhall's 12-16 and named Y1, had outstanding success showing excellent hill climbing ability with an aggregate of 37 seconds less time in the hill climbs than any other car in its class and unparalleled speeds around the Brooklands circuit. His Vauxhall was so far ahead of all cars whatever class that the driver could relax, accomplishing the 200 miles (320 km) at an average speed of 46 mph (74 km/h), when the car was capable of 55 mph (89 km/h). It went on to win class E of the Trial. That design was put into production in 1908 as Vauxhall's 20 hp offering. Four distinct variations were produced between 27 October 1908 and the end of production in 1914. One last car was put together in 1920.

== The four distinct versions - A09, A11, A12 and 16-20 ==
=== Engine ===
The 3-litre side-valve monobloc engine was provided with forced lubrication . The camshaft and magneto were gear-driven until the 16-20 when it was changed to chain drive.

Reviewing the exhibits at the North of England Motor Show at the beginning of 1912 the Manchester Guardian reported that the 20 h.p. engine had been given for 1912 new light connecting rods of very high grade steel and pistons reduced in weight to give smooth running.

=== Gearbox ===
The A09 and A11 were supplied with a four-speed gearbox though some of the earliest cars retained the three-speed gearboxes of the 12-16 and at least 70 of the first cars also retained the sheet copper sump of their predecessor. There was a major revision of the chassis for the A12 and for the 16-20 both engine and chassis underwent major redesign.

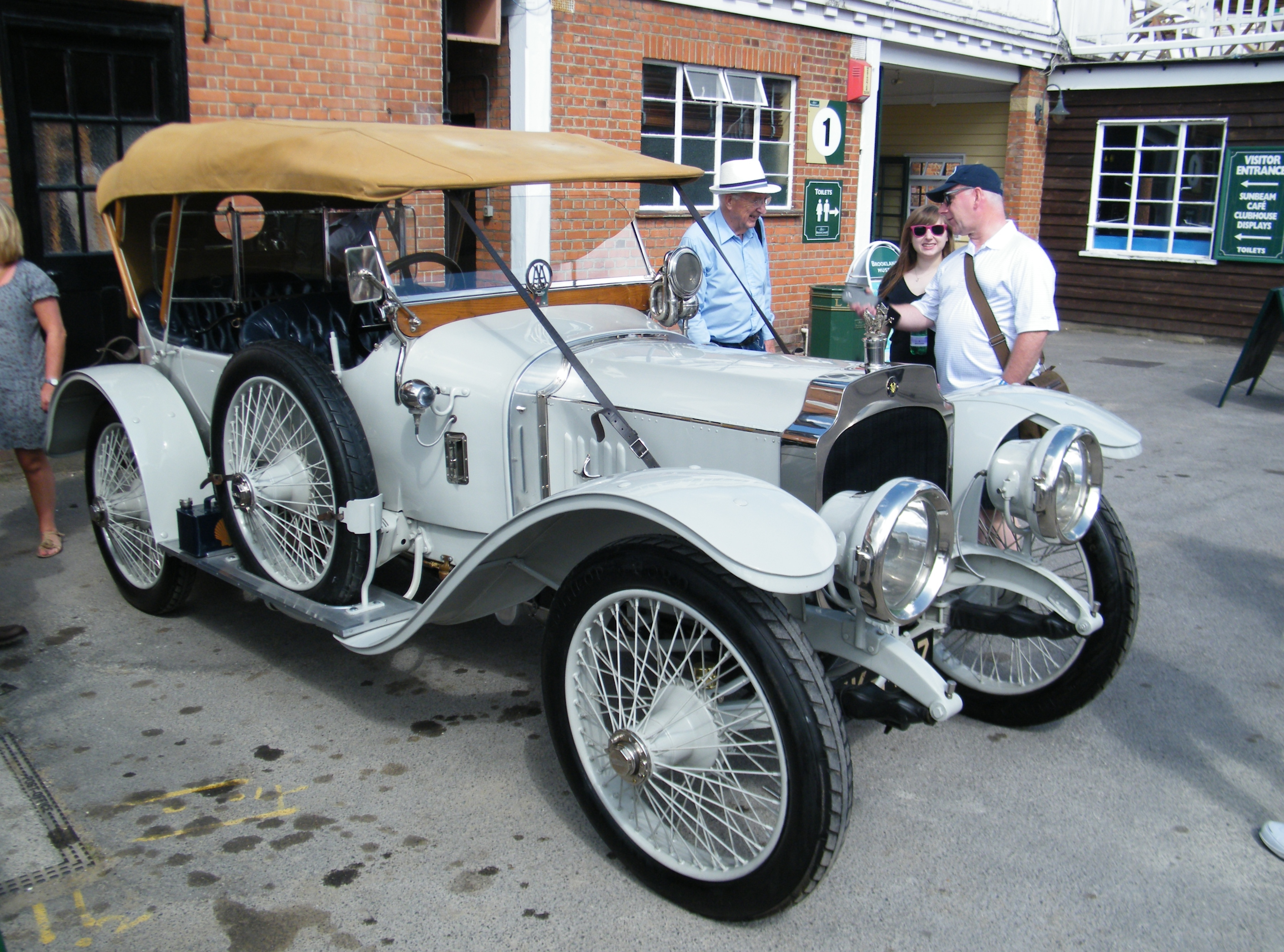
A12 3½-litre, 1912

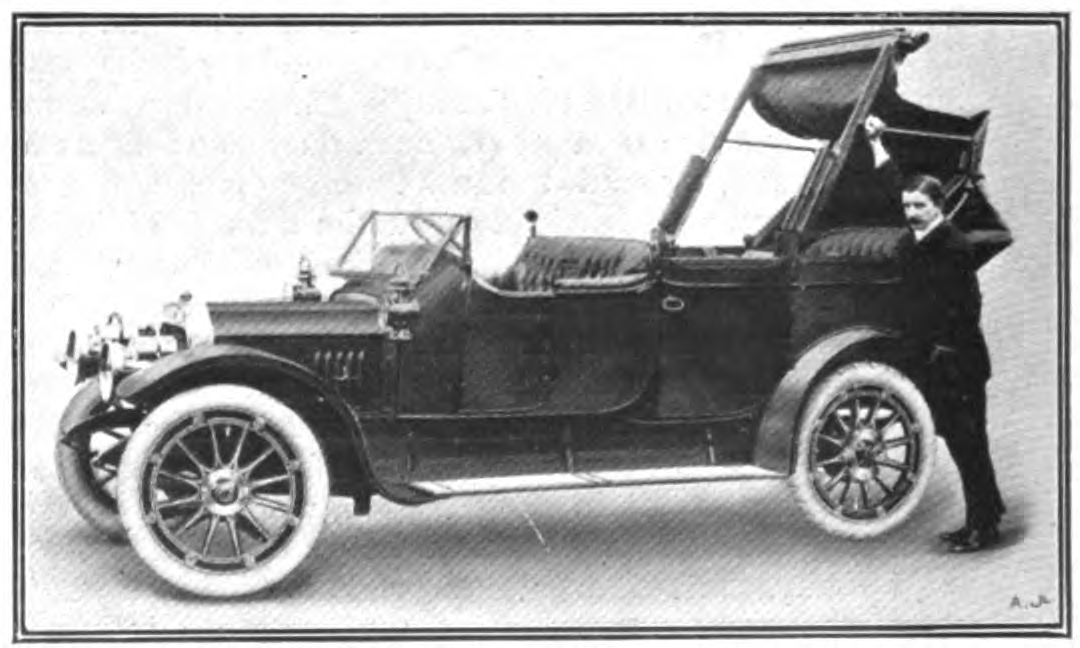
Sutherland cabriolet 1912

=== Range for 1913 ===
In November 1912 immediately before the opening of the Olympia Show Vauxhall announced their range for 1913 would include:

- 16-20 hp 4-cylinder 90 x 120 mm, chassis £395

=== Comparison table ===
All data from Alisdaire Lockhart, The A-type Vauxhall Register

	20 hp A09	20 hp A11	20 hp A12	22 hp A12	16-20 hp A12
Production run:	253 cars	359 cars	36 cars	21 cars	271 cars
Period:	Oct 1908 - Oct 1910	Oct 1910 - Jun 1912	Jun 1912 - Nov 1912		Nov 1912 - 1915; Oct 1920 (one car)
Work Orders:	1770–1778	1803–1811	1811 & 1812		1813–1818
Engine: Capacity Bore x Stroke	- 3 Litre 90 x120	- 3 Litre 90 x120	- 3 Litre 90 x120	- 3½ Litre 95 x120	- 3 Litre 90 x120
Carburettor: White & Poppe Zenith Claudel Hobson	- 30 mm - -	- 30 mm - -	- 30 mm 36 mm -		- 30 mm 36 mm 26 mm
Fuel supply:	gravity	gravity	gravity a few forced feed		forced feed
Cam drive:	gear	gear	gear		chain
Magneto:	Bosch D	Bosch D	Bosch D		Bosch D or Eisman EK4
Clutch:	cone	cone or multi-plate	multi-plate		multi-plate
Brake drums:	12 inches (300 mm)	12 inches (300 mm)	12 inches (300 mm)		9 inches (230 mm)
Rear axle ratio:	1:2.95 to 1:4.13	1:3.65 or 1:3.875	1:3.65 or 1:3.875		1:3.875
King pins:	vertical	vertical	inclined		inclined
Std Wheel size:	875 x105 mm	875 x105 mm	880 x120 mm		815 x105 mm
Sub frame	U section	U section	angle iron		angle iron
Chassis length:	9 ft 7 in (2,920 mm) or 10 ft 3 in (3,120 mm)	9 ft 7 in (2,920 mm) or 10 ft 3 in (3,120 mm)	9 ft 7 in (2,920 mm) or 10 ft 3 in (3,120 mm)		9 ft 9 in (2,970 mm)
Chassis width: Front: Rear:	- 30 inches (760 mm) 36 inches (910 mm)	- 30 inches (760 mm) 36 inches (910 mm)	- 30 inches (760 mm) 36 inches (910 mm)		- 28 inches (710 mm) 34 inches (860 mm)

The A-Type Vauxhall reaches speeds of 100 mph (160 km/h). Within the 21 hp limit, the vehicle established speed and endurance records. The model preceded the development of the Prince Henry and the 30-98 Vauxhalls.

Fewer than two dozen survive today out of the 950 produced.

== Basic chassis changes during production ==
Model	Date range	Chassis Change Work Order	Car number / Range of Car Numbers	Change
16-20	21 Nov 1912 to 2 Oct 1920	1813–1818		For the 16-20 A-Type Laurence Pomeroy introduced a completely new chassis design. With the first work order for 16-20 cars 1813 the chassis had changed quite considerably. The 16-20 A-Type Work Order 1813 Chassis was drawn up in May 1912 Drawing Number: No663-664 Drawing Date: 19-05-1912. The chassis narrowed at the front and rear to Front: 28 inches Rear: 34 inches.
		1813–1818		Sometime in 1913 the clutch, transmission brake and accelerator pedal design changed somewhat.
16-20	16 Aug1913	1814		For the 1814 work order the chassis was redesigned again to
	20 Sep 1913 - onwards	1814	A58-A104	Sometime between A58 and A104 the support brackets for the running boards changed from a bracket secured by 2 large dome headed bolts to a bracket fixed with 4 smaller bolts. The newly designed brackets slowly were fitted as stocks diminished of the 2 bolt type.

== Engine changes during production ==
Model	Date range	Engine Change Work Order	Engine Number / Range of Engine Numbers	Change
A09	xx xxx 1908	1770–1778		The A09...
	24 Nov 1908 to 25 Jun 1909	1770–1771	A09.01-A09.73	Sometime between A09.1 and A09.73 the engine sump was changed from a sheet copper sump carried over from the X Type Engine to a Cast Alloy sump.
A11	xx xxx 1908	1803–1811		The A11...
A12	xx xxx 1908	1811–1812		The A12...
16-20	21 Nov 1912	1813–1818		The 16-20... For the 16-20 A-Type Laurence Pomeroy introduced a completely new engine design with a silent chain drive for the cam-shaft and magneto. The inlet manifold is now cast en bloc with the radiator cooling outlet pipe located at the front where the fan bolts on this was to allow a waterpump to be fitted if required.
	6 Mar 1913 to 26 Jun 1913	1813-1813	A8-A31	Sometime between Engine Numbers A8 and A31 the exhaust manifold gained cooling fins located along the top of the manifold.
	26 Jun 1913 to 12 Mar 1914	1813–1814	A31-A41	Sometime between Engine Numbers A41 and A100 the external oil level pot located on the side of the engine sump carried over from A09-A12 Production was deleted in favour of a redesigned sump integrating this feature.
	26 Jun 1913 to 12 Mar 1914	1813–1816	A31-A100	Sometime between Engine Numbers A31 and A100 the radiator outlet located around the fan on the engine block was relocated to the side of the block near the front under the inlet manifold.
	29 Sep 1913 to 12 Mar 1914	1813–1816	A41-A100	Sometime between Engine Numbers A41 and A100 the external oil feed line going to each main bearing in the crank case was deleted in favor of an oil gallery integral to the crank case.
	12 Mar 1914 to 5 May 1914	1816–1817	A100-A151	Sometime between Engine Numbers A100 and A151 the number of securing bolts holding the radiator inlet on top of the engine block increased from 4 bolts to 6 bolts.
	12 Mar 1914 to 5 May 1914	1816–1817	A100-A151	Sometime between Engine Numbers A100-A151 the steel baffles located under the cylinders in the engine block were deleted from production.

== Surviving cars ==
Model	Year	Chassis Number	Work Order	Engine Number	Gearbox Number	Steering Box Number	Radiator Number	Cooling	Petrol Supply G.Gravity F.Force	Magneto	Carburettor	Hand Brake Dia	Size of Tyre	Rear Axle Ratio	Date of Manufacture	Location	Status	Body Type
A09	1908	A09.1	1770	A09.1				Thermo Syphon	G	Bosch D	W+P 30mm	12"	875x105	15-62	24-11-1908	Australia	Restored	
A09	1909	A09.73	1771	A09.73				Thermo Syphon	G	Bosch D	W+P 30mm	12"	875x105	17-56	25-06-1909	England	Restored	
A11	1911	A11.455	1808	A11.455				Thermo Syphon	F	Bosch D	W+P 30mm	12"	875x105	16-62	29-09-1911	Spain	Restored	
A11	1911	A11.487	1808	A11.471				Thermo Syphon	G	Bosch D	W+P 30mm (Current Engine from A11.471 had Zenith 36mm)	12"	880x120	16-62	7-11-1911	Australia	Restored	
A11	1911	A11.596	1811	A11.440				Thermo Syphon	F	Bosch D	W+P 30mm	12"	875x105	16-62	5-02-1912	Australia	Restored	
A12	1912	A12.670	1812	A12.670				Thermo Syphon	G	Bosch D	Zenith 36mm	12"	875x105	16-62	23-08-1912	Australia	Restored	
A12	1912	England	N/A	N/A	N/A	N/A	N/A	N/A	N/A	N/A	N/A	N/A	N/A	N/A	N/A	N/A	N/A	
16-20	1913	A13	1813	A8	N/A	N/A	N/A	Thermo Syphon	F	Eiseman EK4	Zenith 36mm	9"	815x105	16-62	6-03-1913	New Zealand	Unrestored	
16-20	1913	A35	1813	A31	121	1517	31	Pump	F	Eiseman EK4	Zenith 36mm	9"	880x120	16-62	26-06-1913	Australia	Under Restoration	
16-20	1913	A58	1814	A151	N/A	N/A	N/A	Thermo Syphon	F	Eiseman EK4	Zenith 36mm	9"	880x120	16-62	20-09-1913	Australia	Restored	Ascot 2 seat (original)
16-20	1914	A104	1816	A100	380	N/A	N/A	Thermo Syphon	F	Bosch ZR4	Zenith 36mm	9"	815x105	16-62	12-3-1914	New Zealand	Unrestored	
16-20	1914	A170	1818	A186	704	N/A	1601	N/A	N/A	N/A	Claudel Hobson 26mm	9"	880x120	15-62	01-12-1914	Australia	Restored	
16-20	1914	A198	1817	A192	N/A	N/A	N/A	N/A	N/A	Bosch ZR4	Claudel Hobson 26mm	9"	815x105	16-62	24-11-1914	England	Restored	
16-20	1914	A207	1817	A197	N/A	N/A	N/A	Thermo Syphon	F	Eiseman EK4	Claudel Hobson 26mm	9"	880x120	16-62	8-12-1914	Australia	Unrestored	
16-20	1914	A210	1817	A207	N/A	N/A	N/A	Thermo Syphon	F	Bosch ZU4	Claudel Hobson 26mm	9"	875x105	16-62	23-10-1914	Australia	Restored	
16-20	1914	N/A	N/A	N/A	N/A	N/A	N/A	N/A	N/A	N/A	N/A	N/A	N/A	N/A	N/A	N/A	N/A	
