= Laurence Pomeroy =

English automotive engineer

Laurence Henry
- Born: 1883; London
- Died: 1941 (aged 57–58); London
- Occupation: Automotive engineer

Laurence Henry Pomeroy (1883–1941) was an English automotive engineer trained as a locomotive engineer and particularly interested in the introduction of light alloys into automotive applications.

== Early life ==
Laurence Pomeroy was born in London and after leaving school started a four-year engineering course at the East London Technical College as a Whitworth Exhibitioner (Note: i.e. won a Whitworth Scholarship for the advancement of mechanical engineering. A scholarship provided by Sir Joseph Whitworth) and at the same time became a railway engineering apprentice at the North London Locomotive Works at Bow. Determined to "get on" in 1903 Pomeroy joined Humphreys & Co Civil Engineers in Victoria Street, London. From there he became a draughtsman with Thornycroft in Basingstoke before moving to Vauxhall Motors in Luton in 1905, where he became assistant to chief engineer Frederick Hodges.

== Vauxhall ==
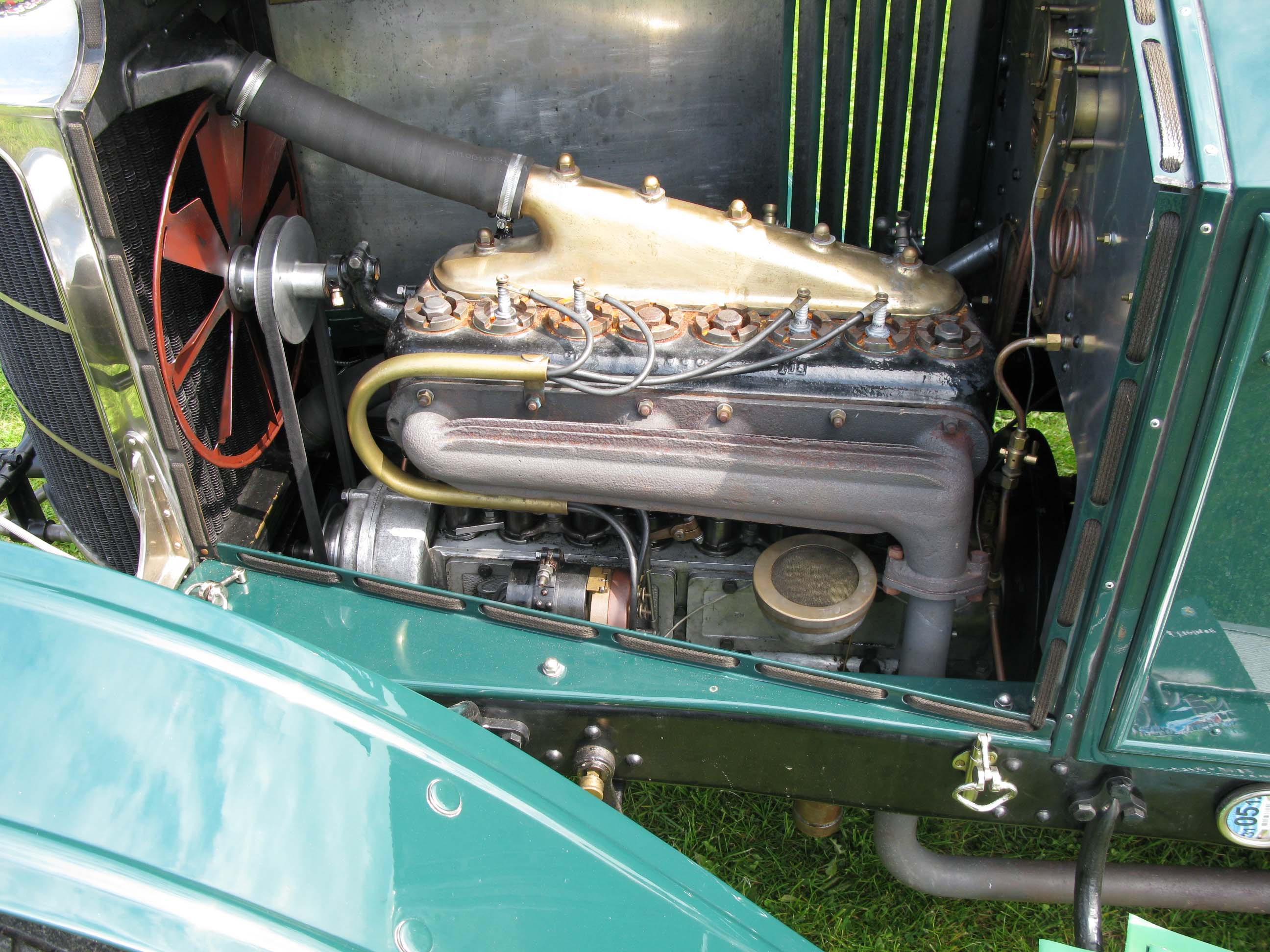
The engine in a 1912 Prince Henry Vauxhall

The chief engineer of Vauxhall, F.W. Hodges, was given an extended winter holiday in 1907–08, and during this time Pomeroy was asked by a joint managing director of Vauxhall, Percy Kidner, to redesign one of their current engines. The objective was to increase its power output for the cars to compete in the RAC 2000 mile trial of 1908.

To improve his French, Pomeroy used a text whose French author described the importance of high piston speeds, as well as the necessity of good breathing through large valves and a free-flowing exhaust system. Pomeroy applied these recommendations to a 20 h.p. engine by developing an L-head valve layout. Output went up from Vauxhall's original 12–16 rating to 38 bhp @ 2500 rpm (the RAC formula estimate was 23.5 bhp @ 1800 rpm). Vauxhall advertisements now boasted "buy a 20 hp Vauxhall, pay tax on 20 hp but get near double the horsepower in your car."

The new cars won several classes in the RAC trial. Pomeroy was promoted to the post of Works Manager effectively replacing Hodges. Vauxhall achieved greater public interest. After three years as the assistant chief engineer, Pomeroy was appointed Works Manager in 1910. By 1914, he was the automaker's technical director.

In 1913, he was elected a full member of the Institution of Mechanical Engineers. He was also a member of the Institute of Automobile Engineers, and served as the organisation's president during 1934–35.

== Alcoa ==
After World War I, in 1919, Pomeroy left Vauxhall (he was then working on an overhead camshaft six and a V12 and the board was not interested in either of them) and moved to the United States. He was employed the Aluminum Company of America to increase the amount of aluminium used in motor cars. This included the engine blocks, pistons, covers, and accessories, as well as was for aluminium car bodies. The American Body Company in Buffalo NY assembled these bodies. The Pierce-Arrows used a Pomeroy engine and for some units, both engine and car were built by Pierce-Arrow.

== Daimler ==
The British Daimler company and AEC (makers of London buses) began a joint venture in 1926. It was named Associated Daimler and Pomeroy was recruited by Percy Martin of Daimler to be the chief engineer with responsibility for the new venture's commercial vehicles. Pomeroy's contribution was a coach chassis with extensive use of aluminium alloy, made as the Daimler CF6. Pomeroy returned to England in October 1926, and the joint venture ended in 1929.

Pomeroy moved to the main Daimler operation as general manager in 1928, becoming managing director in 1929. He was responsible for the design of the second, small Double-Six 30/40 of 1930 and a 3½-litre six that same year. This new 81.5 x 114mm, 3568 cc, six-cylinder was rated at 25 hp for tax purposes, and featured a monobloc aluminium cylinder block, detachable head, and balanced sleeve valves. Dual pumps within the sump provided a novel internal lubrication system.

The automobile industry experienced financial difficulties during the late 1920s. Daimler's situation seemed particularly serious. Sales fell sharply in 1927 and 1928. Financial losses continued and the company paid no dividends from 1929 to 1936. The sleeve valve engine was now obsolete technology, Daimler's production methods were no longer up-to-date, and the firm continued to market a large range of products. Investors became concerned with the dwindling sales volume, lack of competitive products, and the company's need to update their machine tool equipment. Stratton-Instone's new dominance of distribution was removed and new outlets arranged. The interests in Singer and the Daimler Hire business were sold and Lanchester bought. The in-house bodywork department was closed and by the spring of 1931 car production ceased, only commercial vehicle production and aero engine work kept Daimler in business.

Pomeroy introduced redesigned poppet valve engines with the Daimler Fifteen in September 1932, developed new models of Daimlers, recommended what became the September 1932 introduction of the small BSA and Lanchester Tens with poppet valve engines to help Daimler survive the depression and according to Percy Martin, these actions rescued the business from total collapse in 1932.

The new 1934 Straight-Eights were a personal triumph for Pomeroy.

A difference of opinion developed with the company's new chairman, Geoffrey Burton (who did not have motor industry experience). Burton believed that Daimler should concentrate solely on large cars. This caused Pomeroy to resign in 1936.

== Aero engines ==
In 1938, Pomeroy joined De Havilland Aircraft company as general manager of their engine division. The following year chose to become a patent consultant. Following the outbreak of the war, he joined H. M. Hobson (Aircraft and Motor) Components Ltd.

Pomeroy died of a heart attack on 27 May 1941, in Harrow-on-the-Hill, Middlesex.

== Laurence Evelyn Wood Pomeroy ==
Pomeroy had one son in 1907, also named Laurence (Laurence Evelyn Wood Pomeroy, born in Luton) who became a motoring and technical journalist. Readers of the popular weekly, The Motor, during the 1940s and 1950s were exposed to Pomeroy design successes at Vauxhall while his son served as the technical editor of magazine from 1936 to 1958. The younger Pomeroy died the same way as his father and at the same age, 58, in 1966.

L.E.W. Pomeroy authored the two volume history The Grand Prix Car covering the vehicles from 1906 to 1955. He also wrote Design and Behaviour of the Racing Car in collaboration with Stirling Moss.
