= Lancefield Coachworks =

Defunct bespoke automobile body-builder

The Lancefield Coachworks Limited was a builder of bespoke bodies for expensive car chassis always introducing sporting elements into designs. Lancefield operated as coachbuilders from 1921 to 1948 then switched their business to aircraft components which had been their wartime activity. They were based in London at Wrenfield Place, Herries Street, Queen's Park, W10.

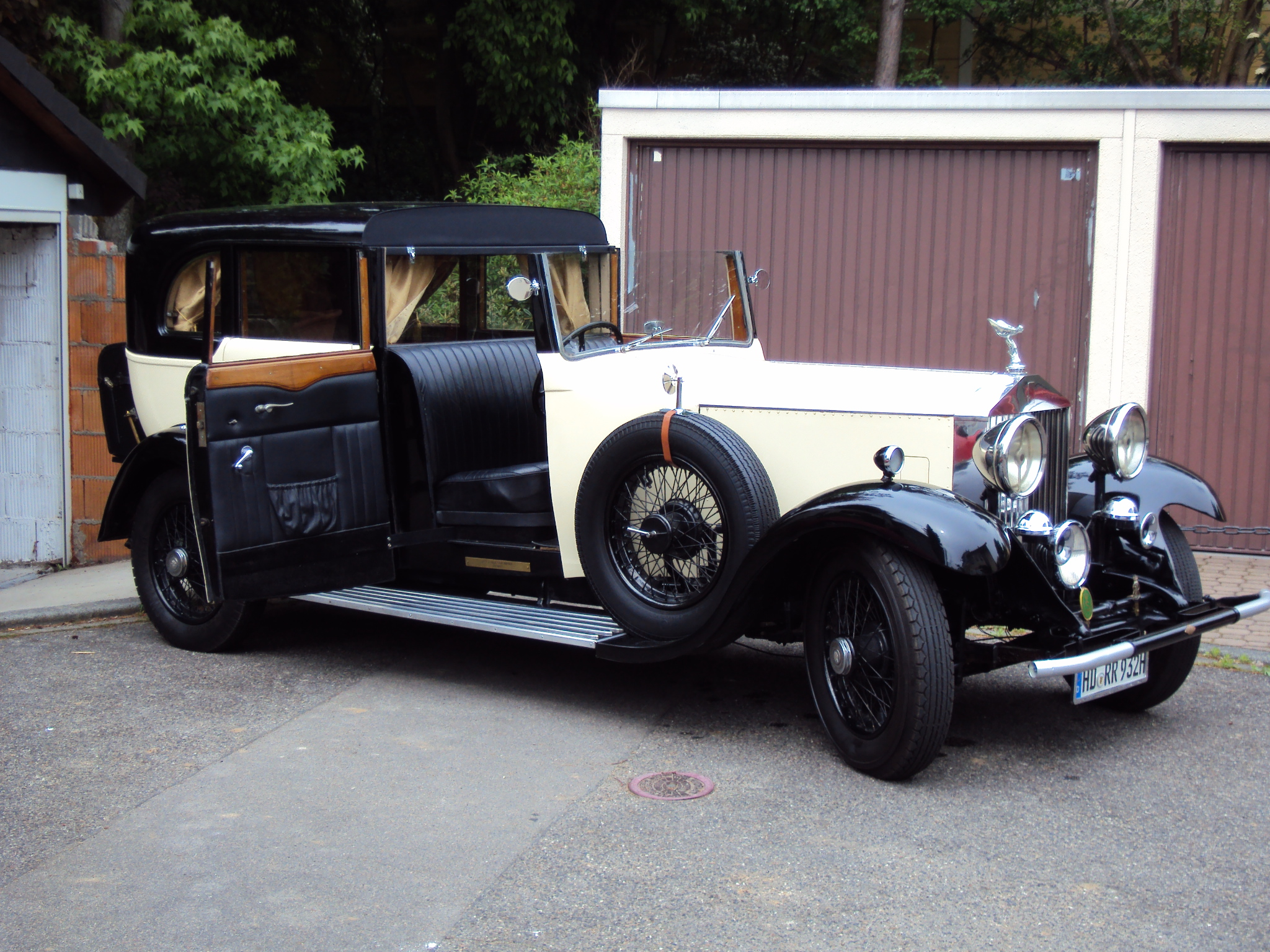
Rolls-Royce 20-25 sedanca de ville

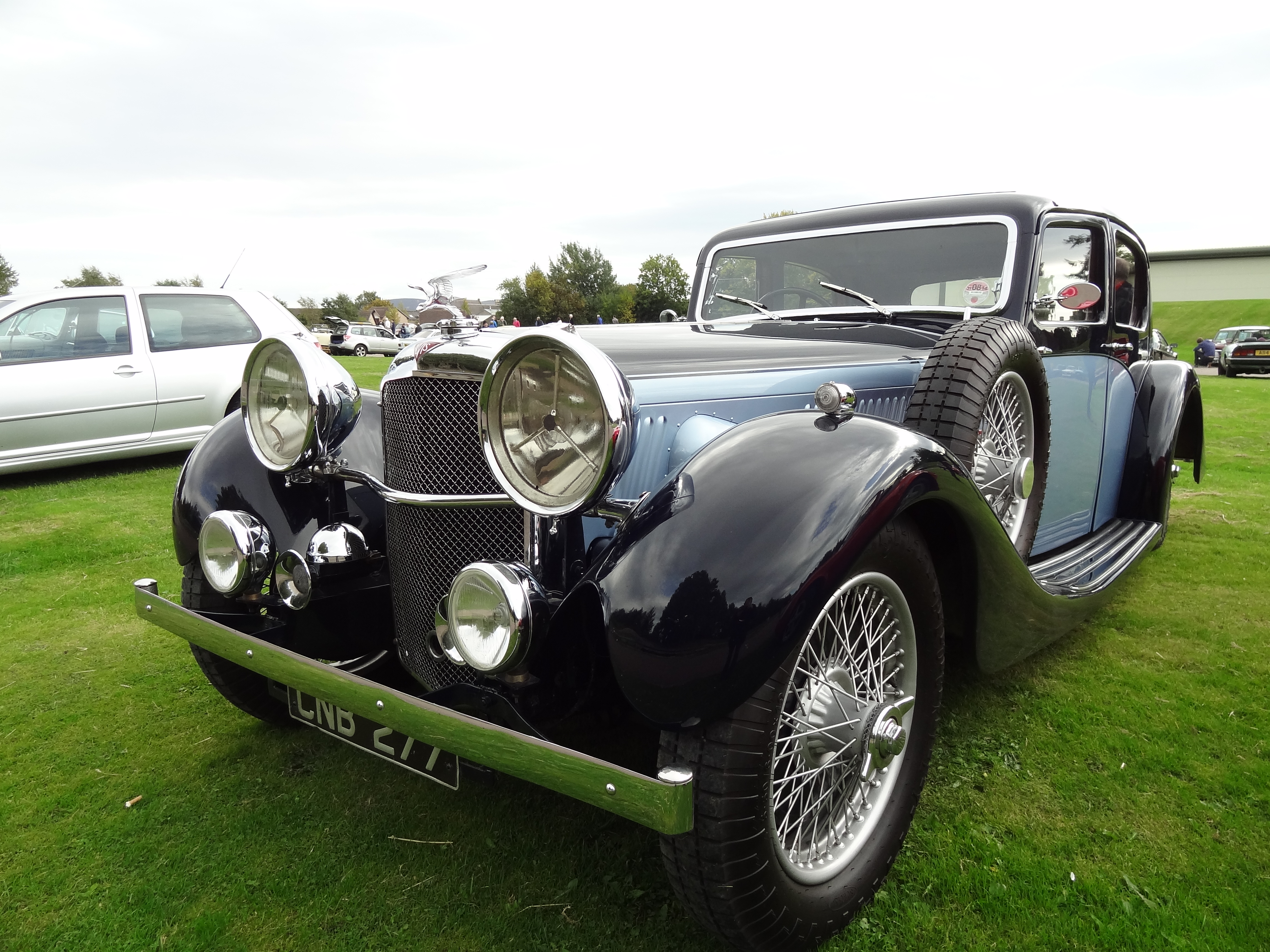
Alvis Speed Twenty SD 4-door sports saloon 1936

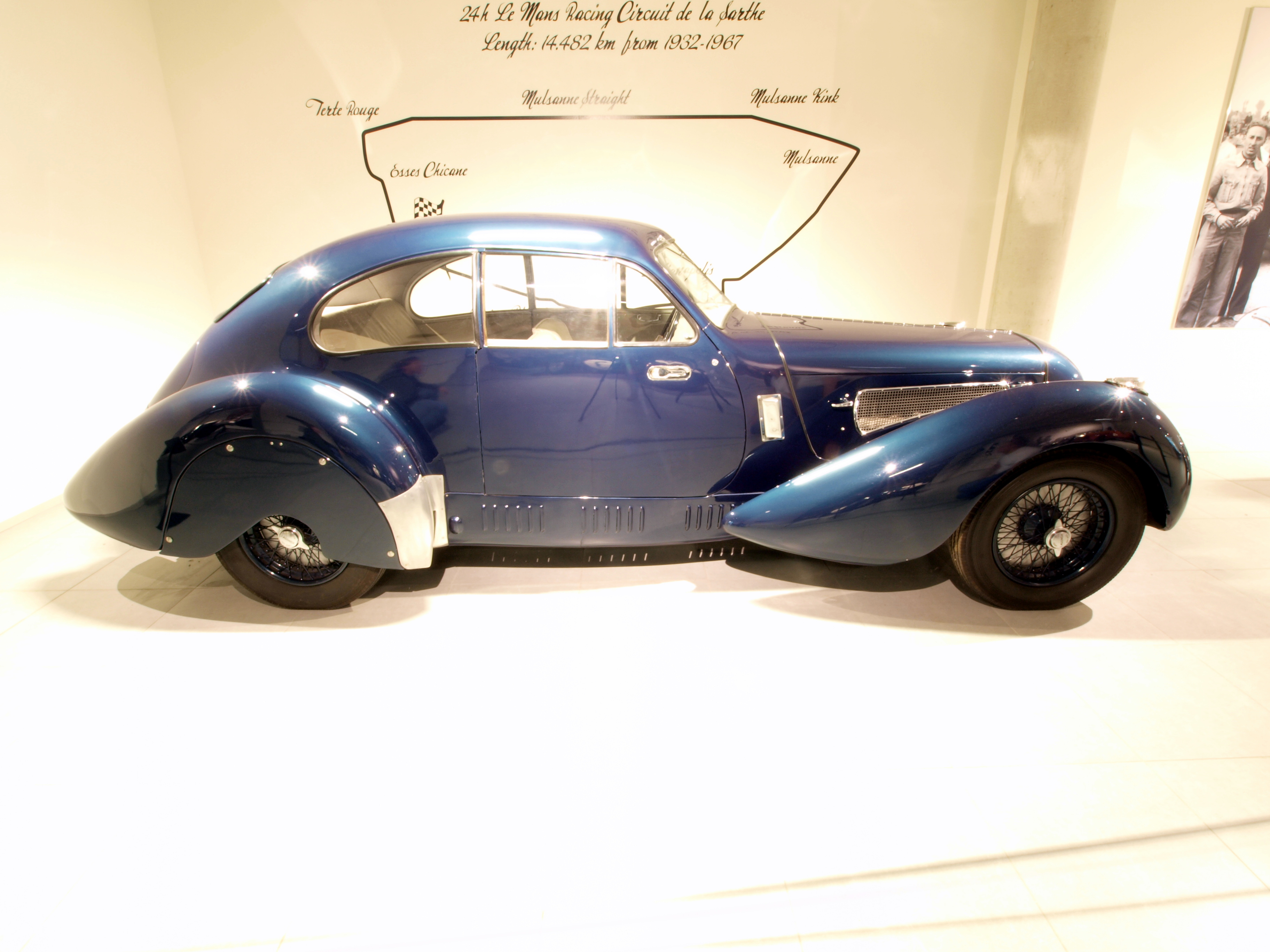
Lagonda V12 fixed head coupé 1939 Louwman Museum, The Netherlands

== Foundation ==
Initially known as Gaisford & Warboys they worked from Lancefield Street in Queen's Park then on moving to nearby Beethoven Street changed their business's name to Lancefield Coachworks later incorporating a company of that same name.

== Personnel ==
Gaisford brothers, alumni of Grosvenor Carriage Company a part of the Shaw & Kilburn group of General Motors dealers. Harry, Edwin and Bob Gaisford and George Warboys.

Jock Betteridge, head designer, also from Grosvenor.

== Chassis clothed ==
- Rolls-Royce - more than 150
- Bentley
- Weymann bodies on Stutz chassis
- Isotta Fraschini
- Cadillac
- Daimler In both the 1948 and 1949 London Motor Shows Lancefield displayed Daimler Straight-Eight limousines specially equipped with a full length stretcher and extensive medical equipment to carry an invalid and they were awarded a Silver Gilt medal. The vehicles are fully described by Brian E Smith in his book, The Daimler Tradition.

== Aircraft components ==
Exhaust manifolds and other pipework including gas turbine tailpipes; cowlings and other presswork; alloy seats and harnesses.

== Sources ==
Bonham's Auctions accessed 26 March 2013 RM Auctions accessed 26 March 2013
