= Vauxhall Big Six =

Vauxhall Big 6
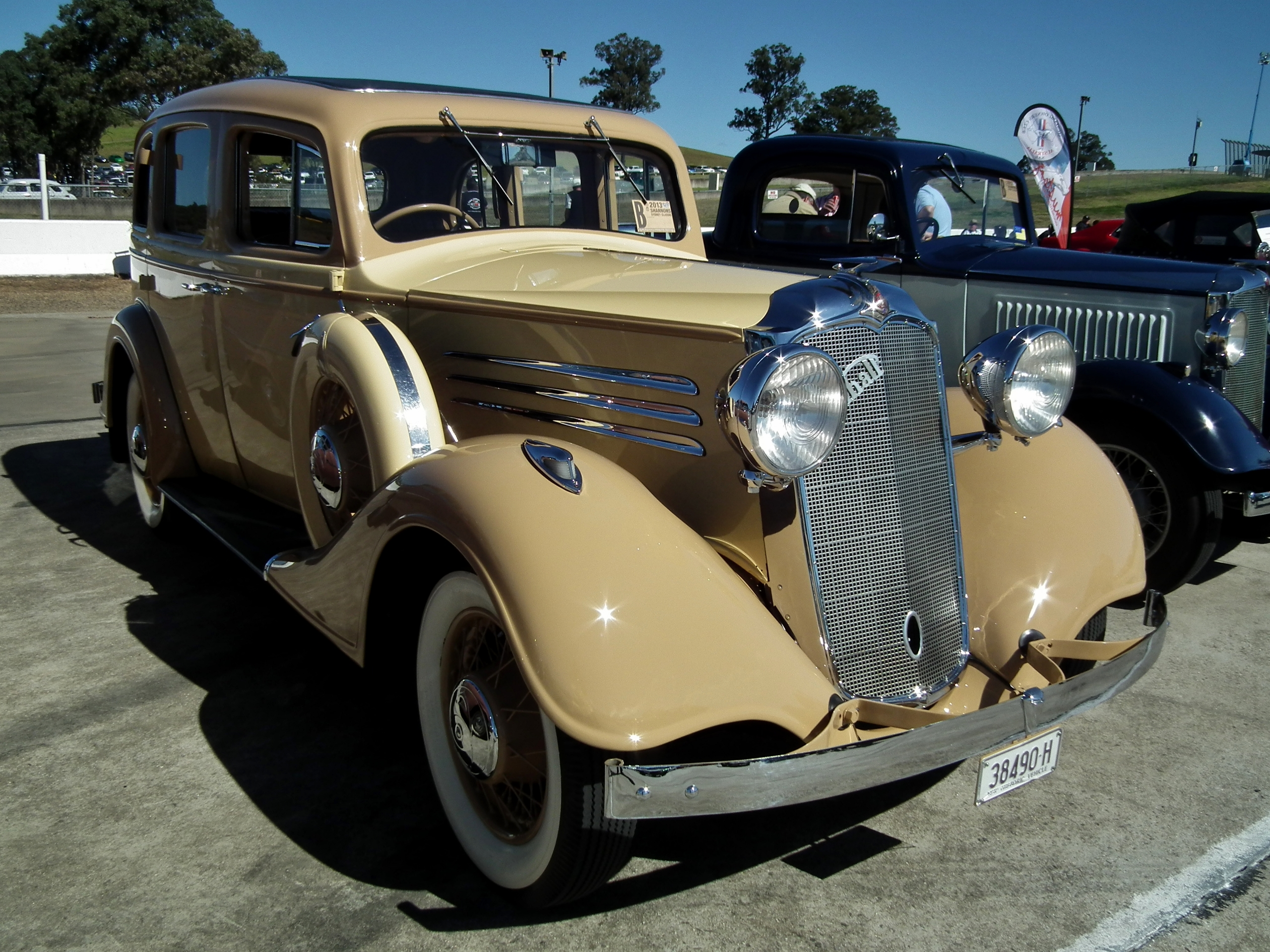
- 1935 Vauxhall BX Big-Six Australia

Overview
- Manufacturer: Vauxhall and Holden
- Also called: Vauxhall BX/BY and BYL; Vauxhall GY and GL
- Production: 1934 to 1940
- Assembly: England; Australia

Body and chassis
- Body style: 4-door saloon; Drophead coupé; Long wheelbase limousine; 4-door roadster Australia
- Layout: FR layout

Powertrain
- Engine: 2393 cc BX I6; 3180 cc BY I6; 3215 cc GY I6

Dimensions
- Wheelbase: 111 in (2,819 mm); 130 in (3,302 mm)
- Length: 170 in (4,318 mm); 184 in (4,674 mm)

Chronology
- Predecessor: Vauxhall Silent Eighty; Vauxhall Cadet

The Vauxhall Big 6 is a name given to a series of automobiles which was produced by Vauxhall in England from 1934 to 1940. Rolling chassis were also bodied in Australia.

== Model BX/BY and BXL ==
Based on a lengthened 111 in (2,819 mm) version of the Vauxhall Cadet the new car had a conventional chassis with semi-elliptical leaf springs all round and Vauxhall-Lovejoy hydraulic dampers. Wire-spoked wheels were fitted. Compared with the Cadet, the engine was mounted further forwards. To satisfy the demand for larger coach-built bodies there was the BXL model, a long wheelbase, 130 in (3,302 mm) version. Two engines were offered, both six-cylinders. The larger engine with a tax horsepower rating of 27 had a capacity of 3180 cc and was based on the VY Cadet, but with an improved cylinder head and 5.6:1 compression ratio. It had a bore of 81 mm and stroke of 95 mm. The smaller, 20 HP, 2393 cc had a reduced bore of 73 mm and produced 52 bhp (39 kW) at 3900 rpm. The power was transmitted to the rear axle via a single-plate clutch to a 4-speed gearbox, with "silent third" and synchromesh on 3rd & 4th gears. Twelve volt electrics were fitted.

An unusual feature unique to the Big Six was the "Pedomatic" starting system. To start the car the accelerator pedal had to be depressed which switched on the starter motor. After the engine started the vacuum in the inlet manifold disengaged the starter motor. The Vauxhall Big Six was similarly styled to the contemporary 1934 Chevrolet Master.

The factory standard six light saloon was well fitted out with leather upholstery and lots of wood trimmings. All the windows used "Triplex" toughened glass. Other bodies which appeared in Vauxhall's own brochure included the Hurlingham coupé built by Grosvenor, and the Rye cabriolet, and Denton and Romney coupés by Martin Walker. In 1934 a 7-seater Newmarket saloon was added to the range. In 1935 several changes including a re-designed radiator grille painted in body colour, the spare wheel mounted on the wing got a cover and the front seats were redesigned. The chassis was also supplied to external coachbulders including Salmons.

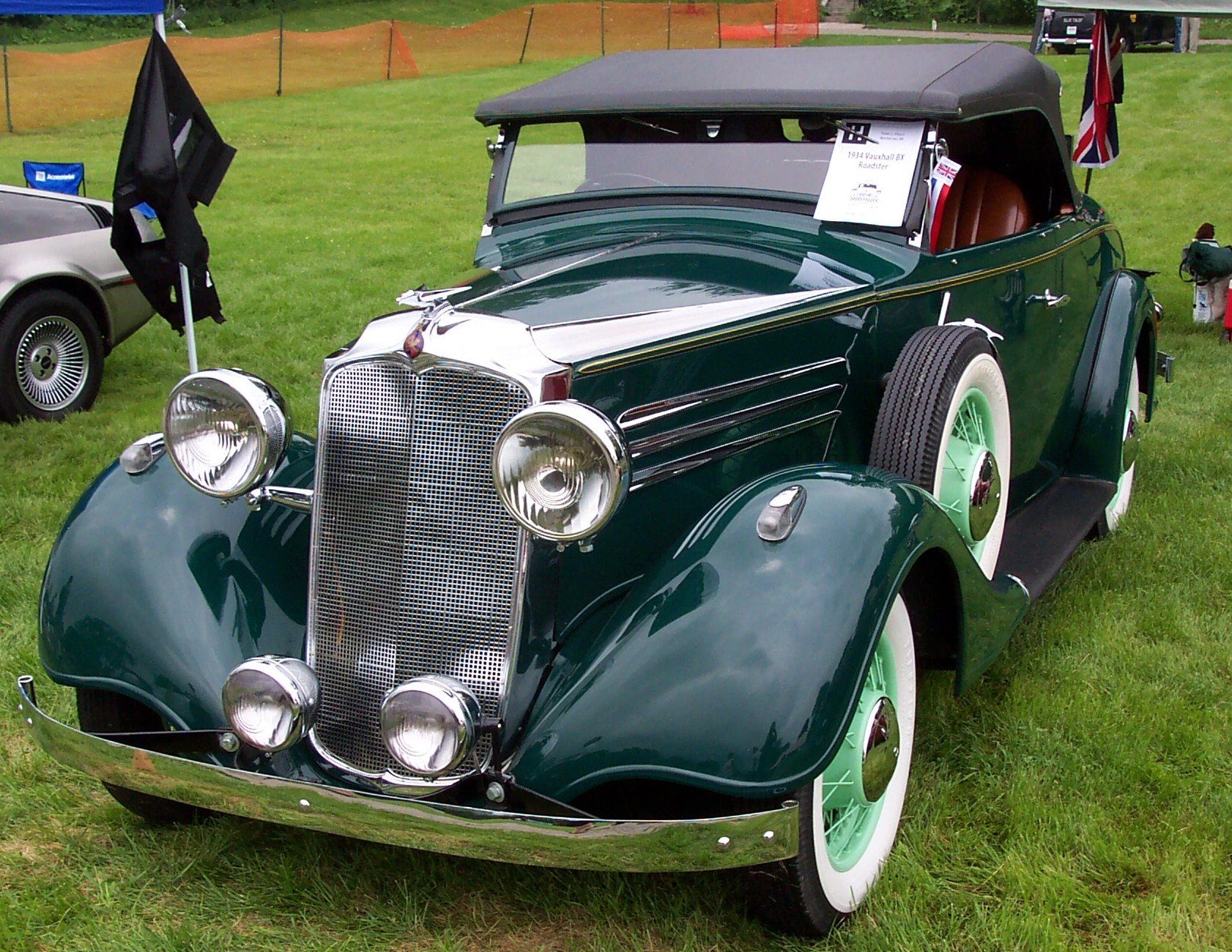
1934 BX (20 HP) roadster body by Holden

The launch price for the standard saloon was GBP325 and the most expensive car in the range, the long-wheelbase limousine was GBP550.

A 27 HP BY was tested by The Motor magazine in 1934 and achieved a top speed of 72 mph (116 km/h) and accelerated from 0-60 mph in 28 seconds. Autocar magazine tested the 20 HP BX in 1936 and recorded 0–60 in 36.5 seconds. They did not record an actual top speed but stated that it would exceed 70 mph (113 km/h).

3788 BY/BX and 796 BXL cars were produced.

== Model GY/GL ==
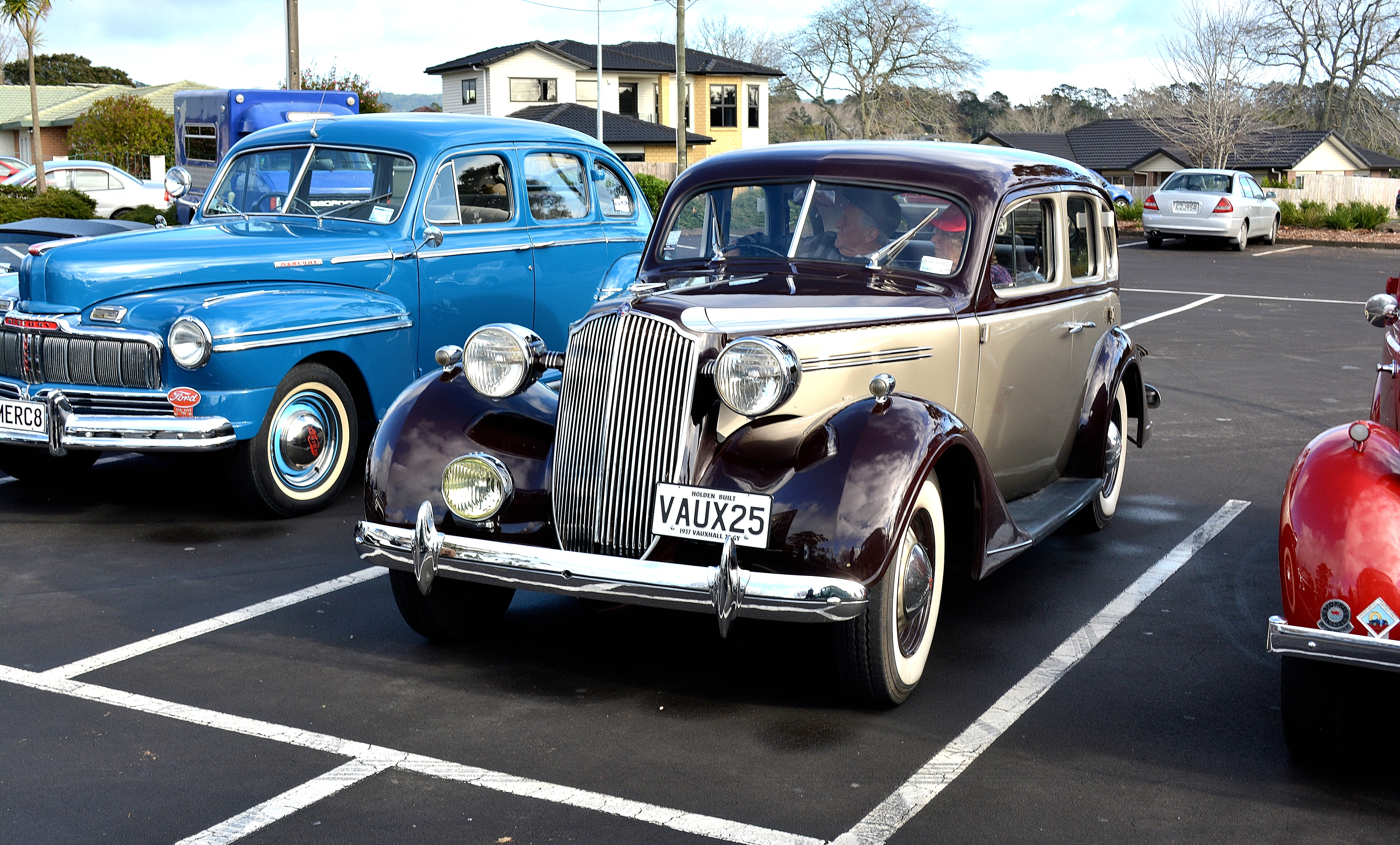
1937 GY (25 HP), built by Holden

The GY/GL or Twenty Five replaced the BX/BY in 1937 being first shown at the 1936 London Motor Show. The GL code was for the long wheelbase version. Although the chassis had the same wheelbase options as the outgoing model it was completely new and featured cross-braced spacing members for extra rigidity. It was the last car chassis to be designed by Vauxhall. Steel wheels replaced the wires and the front suspension was now independent using torsion bars. Lockheed hydraulic brakes with a dual-circuit for safety were used. The engine was extensively altered and its capacity increased to 3215 cc. The change was achieved by extending the stroke to 101.6 mm and decreasing the bore to 81.9 mm, the effect of which was to put the car into the lower 25 hp tax bracket. The 4-speed gearbox was carried over and in 1938 gained synchromesh on first gear. Also for 1938 the car came as standard with a heater and the Pedomatic starting system was dropped.

Authorised bodies included a standard saloon by Vauxhall (GBP298), a Tickford foursome coupé (GBP365), Wingham cabriolet by Martin Walker (GBP400), Sports Saloon by Grosvenor (GBP345), Continental saloon by Connaught (GBP498), and a Limousine by Grosvenor (GBP575).

A car tested by the Autocar magazine reached 76 mph (122 km/h) and accelerated from 0-60 mph in 21.9 seconds. A total of 6,822 had been produced when World War II stopped production; the car did not re-appear after the war.
