= Vauxhall 20-60 =

Vauxhall 20-60 R-type and T-type
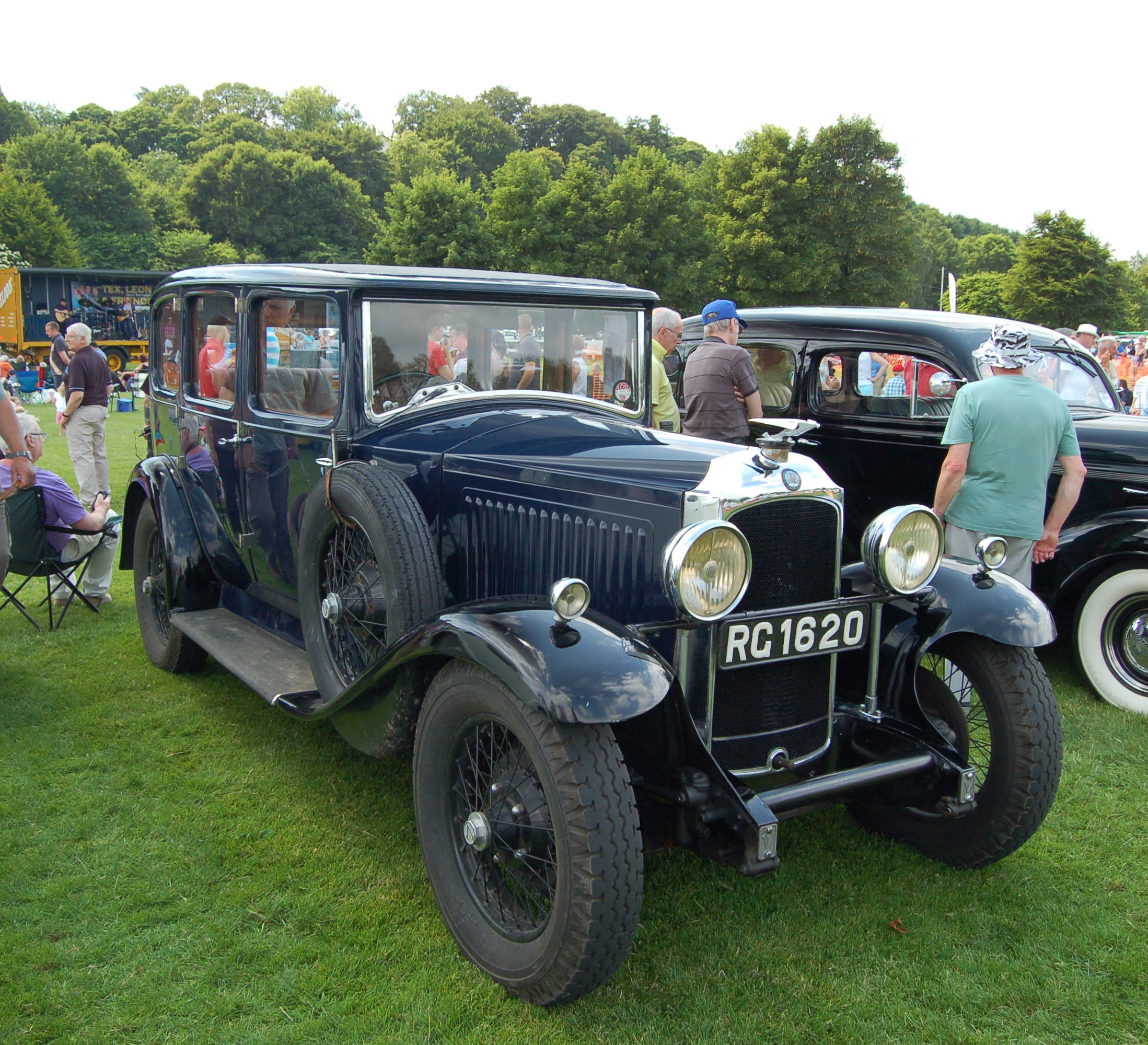
- Vauxhall T-type Kimpton saloon (1930)

Overview
- Manufacturer: Vauxhall (General Motors)
- Production: 1927–1930
- Model years: 1928–1930
- Assembly: Luton, United Kingdom

Body and chassis
- Class: medium
- Body style: open 2-seater 5 seater tourer saloon cabriolet limousine Chassis only also supplied
- Layout: Front-engine, rear-wheel-drive layout

Powertrain
- Engine: I6: R-Type 169 cu in (2,762 cc); T-Type 178 cu in (2,916 cc)
- Transmission: by single-plate dry clutch to the 4-speed gearbox coupled by a fabric joint and 2¼ in. diameter tubular propeller shaft to the spiral-bevel driven semi-floating rear axle with a banjo case

Dimensions
- Wheelbase: 10'3" 3,124.2 mm (123 in); LWB 10'10" 3,302.0 mm (130 in); track: 4'8" 1,422.4 mm (56 in) ground clearance 9 in (230 mm)
- Length: and width and height depends on coachwork
- Kerb weight: no weight advised for a complete car; chassis only 1,143 kg (2,520 lb) 22½ cwt

Chronology
- Predecessor: Vauxhall 14-40
- Successor: Vauxhall Eighty – see this page

20-60 engine R-Type

Overview
- Manufacturer: Vauxhall (General Motors)

Layout
- Configuration: inline 6
- Displacement: 2,762 cc (169 cu in)
- Cylinder bore: 73 mm (2.9 in)
- Piston stroke: 110 mm (4.3 in)
- Cylinder block material: 6 cylinders, iron cast en bloc and with the upper half of the crankcase. Crankshaft runs in 9 bearings and is statically and dynamically balanced. Pistons are of cast-iron. Three rings are set around the pistons above the gudgeon pin, one is a scraper.
- Cylinder head material: cast-iron, demountable
- Valvetrain: overhead through steel push rods and aluminium rockers from a three-bearing camshaft driven by silent-type chain.

Combustion
- Fuel system: Autovac, Triple diffuser Zenith carburettor, water-jacketted induction pipe
- Fuel type: petrol
- Cooling system: water-cooling fan-assisted, water circulated by impellor, temperature thermostatically controlled

Output
- Power output: not published Tax rating 19.82 h.p.

Chronology
- Predecessor: Vauxhall 14-40
- Successor: T-Type – see this page

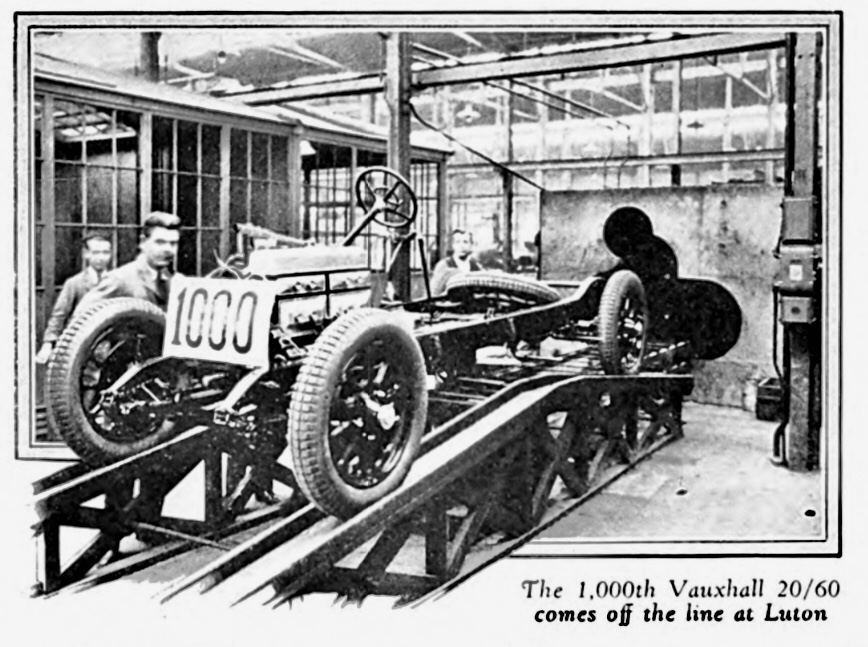
Vauxhall 20-60 No. 1000 produced January 1928

The Vauxhall 20-60 is a four or five-seater saloon, limousine, tourer or coupé-cabriolet manufactured by Vauxhall of Luton. It was announced on 28 September 1927 with a six-cylinder engine and a four-speed gearbox. A cautious move downmarket. "The first time any six-cylinder Vauxhall has been sold under £1000!" "British & Vauxhall". The initial 2.7-litre engine was enlarged to 3-litres after twelve months.

Priced to be at the lower end of the luxury market with six cylinders, four speeds and five brakes, the better endowed 20-60 replaced the 4-cylinder Vauxhall 14-40. Though the new engine's capacity or swept volume was enlarged by just 465 cc, the vagaries of the RAC or tax formula moved its tax rating from 14HP to 20HP. This tax increase was a significant impost for owners. Its design was completed before General Motors took control in late 1925, making the car "in construction and plan British".

The 20-60 – it was given a 3.3-litre engine in October 1930 and renamed 80, later Silent Eighty – remained in production until the introduction of Vauxhall's first true General Motors large-car design, the Vauxhall Big Six, announced and displayed in October 1933 but not delivered until August 1934 long after the GM-designed medium-sized Cadet released in October 1930.

This gap in Vauxhall's programme may reflect the sales-failure of their very expensive 25-70 sleeve-valve car.

General Motors had taken control of Vauxhall 16 November 1925.

== Design and specifications ==
=== Engine ===
The iron engine block is cast in one unit with the crankcase. It has been given a crankshaft with nine bearings which makes the strongest contribution to the engine's smooth running, even at high speed. The overhead valves have been given double springs and the cup-and-ball joints on the rockers are fed with oil forced up to the rocker shaft. The cast-iron cylinder head may be removed without disturbing valve settings. The valve mechanism has an easily removable light aluminium cover. The crankcase has a breather on the oil filling cap. Drive to the three-bearing camshaft and the built in generator is provided by chain. Spark timing is controlled automatically. The distributor is positioned at the back of the engine.

Inlet and exhaust manifolds are on the right hand side of the block. the inlet manifold's two branch mixing chamber has a vee-shaped piece inside which is heated by exhaust gases. An air-cleaner is provided. Petrol is supplied from a 14-gallon tank at the rear of the car through an Autovac tank on the dashboard. Further engine details are provided in the panel to the right.

Engine clutch and gearbox are assembled as one unit and mounted at three points.
Designer Charles Evelyn King.

=== Transmission ===
The single plate dry clutch has a central external spring and roller spigot bearing. The gears are changed by a central lever working in an invisible gate. There is a brake lever just to the left of the gear lever operating a band transmission brake mounted directly behind the gearbox. The band may be adjusted by a threaded rod. Drive is taken by an open propeller shaft coupled by triple Hardy disc joints to the half-floating spiral-bevel driven rear axle which has a banjo case.

=== Chassis ===
The suspension is by half-elliptical springs in front and behind, those at the back being underhung. The front springs are flat-set, held out-of-centre and shackled forward. Dampers are fitted front and back. The four-wheel brakes are cable operated. Steering is by Marles cam and roller.

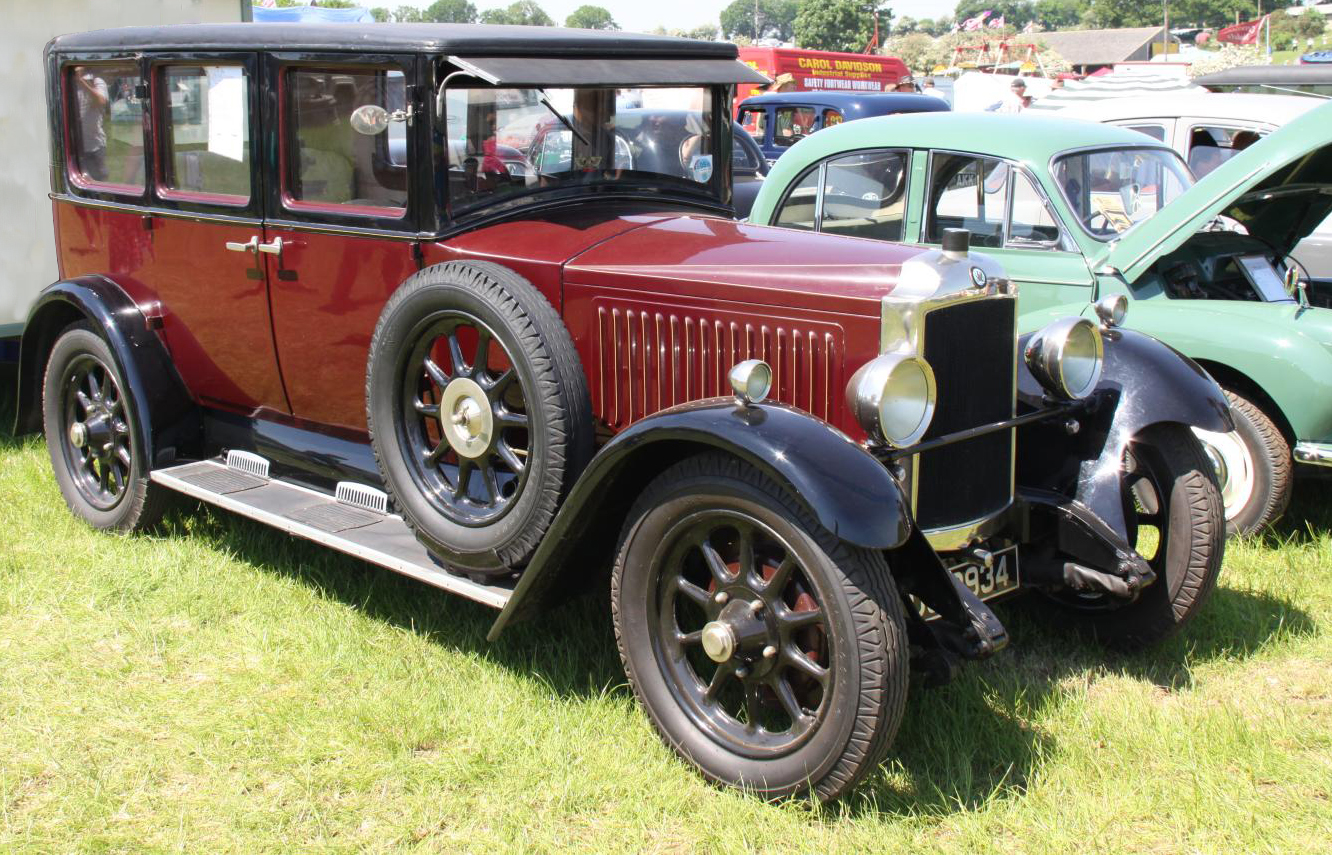
R-type saloon

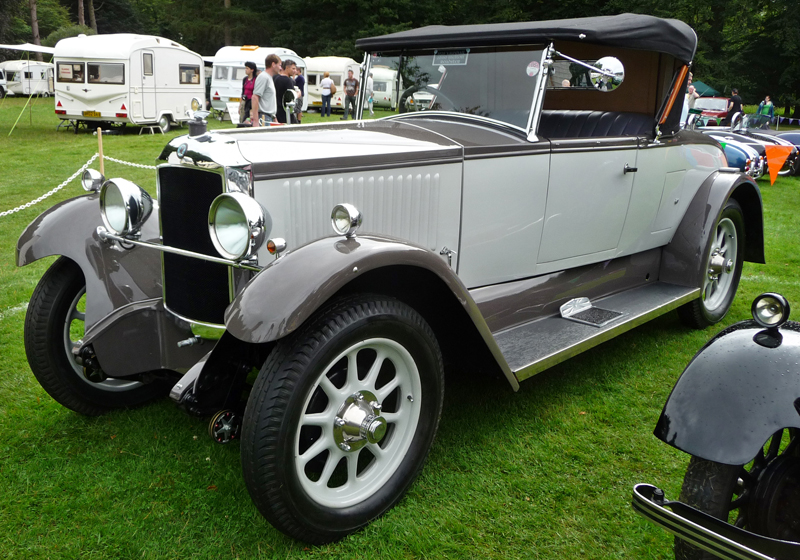
R-type Melton open 2-seater 1928 with dickey seat

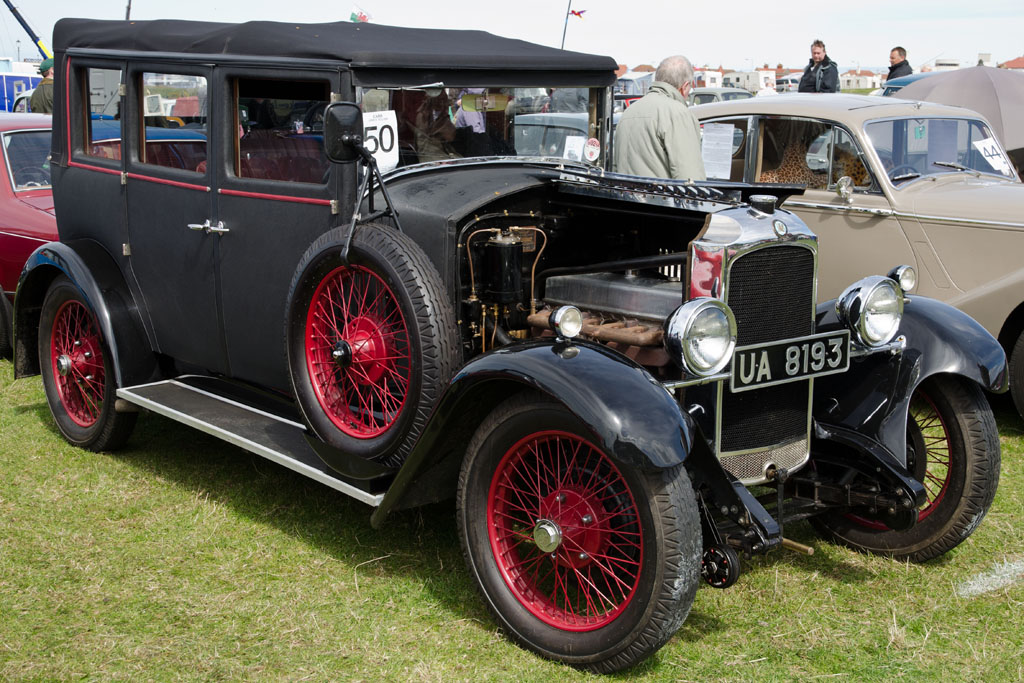
R-type Cabriolet 1928

== Road test ==
The motoring correspondent of The Times reported that he liked the car though he thought the suspension could be improved, the springs at the back were too harsh with just two persons in the car. Otherwise he considered the car pleasing, the engine well balanced and it made no noise, the controls were light and simple and functioned correctly. He considered the four wheel brakes to be some of the best he had experienced, particularly as they are without servo-assistance.

The saloon body, he said, seats five in comfort having two adjustable seats in front, four doors and four winding windows. The instruments have concealed lighting and are neatly grouped on the dash. The battery is kept under the front floor boards in front of the passenger's seat and tools are in a box on the running board. There is a good sized luggage grid at the back. The spare wheel and its tyre are mounted forward of the driver's door.

20-60 engine T-Type

Overview
- Manufacturer: Vauxhall Motors Limited

Layout
- Configuration: inline 6
- Displacement: 2,916 cc (178 cu in)
- Cylinder bore: 75 mm (3.0 in)
- Piston stroke: 110 mm (4.3 in)
- Cylinder block material: Pistons are of aluminium

Combustion
- Fuel system: Autovac, Triple diffuser Zenith carburettor, water-jacketted induction pipe

Output
- Power output: 54 bhp (40 kW; 55 PS) @ 3,000 rpm Tax rating 20.93 h.p.

Chronology
- Successor: Vauxhall Eighty – see this page

== Improvements for 1929 ==
The engine bore has been increased from 73 mm to 75 mm, adding 465 cc to the swept area and thus making it a 2.9-litre engine. The combustion head, intake manifold, camshaft and silencer are redesigned. Pistons are now aluminium and the crankshaft bearings have been enlarged to meet the greater power output. The steering has been modified.

Vauxhall now produced just the one model. The luxurious 25-70 sleeve-valve six and the 30-98 had been dropped from production.

The car was also given a taller narrower radiator (2 inches higher), making the top of the radiator and the top of the scuttle almost level, and a more slender body with wider front wings. Larger nickel finished headlamps are mounted high on a nickel finish bar. There was a 25 percent increase in the engine's power output; improved acceleration and flexibility; improved brakes; a stronger chassis and better springs.

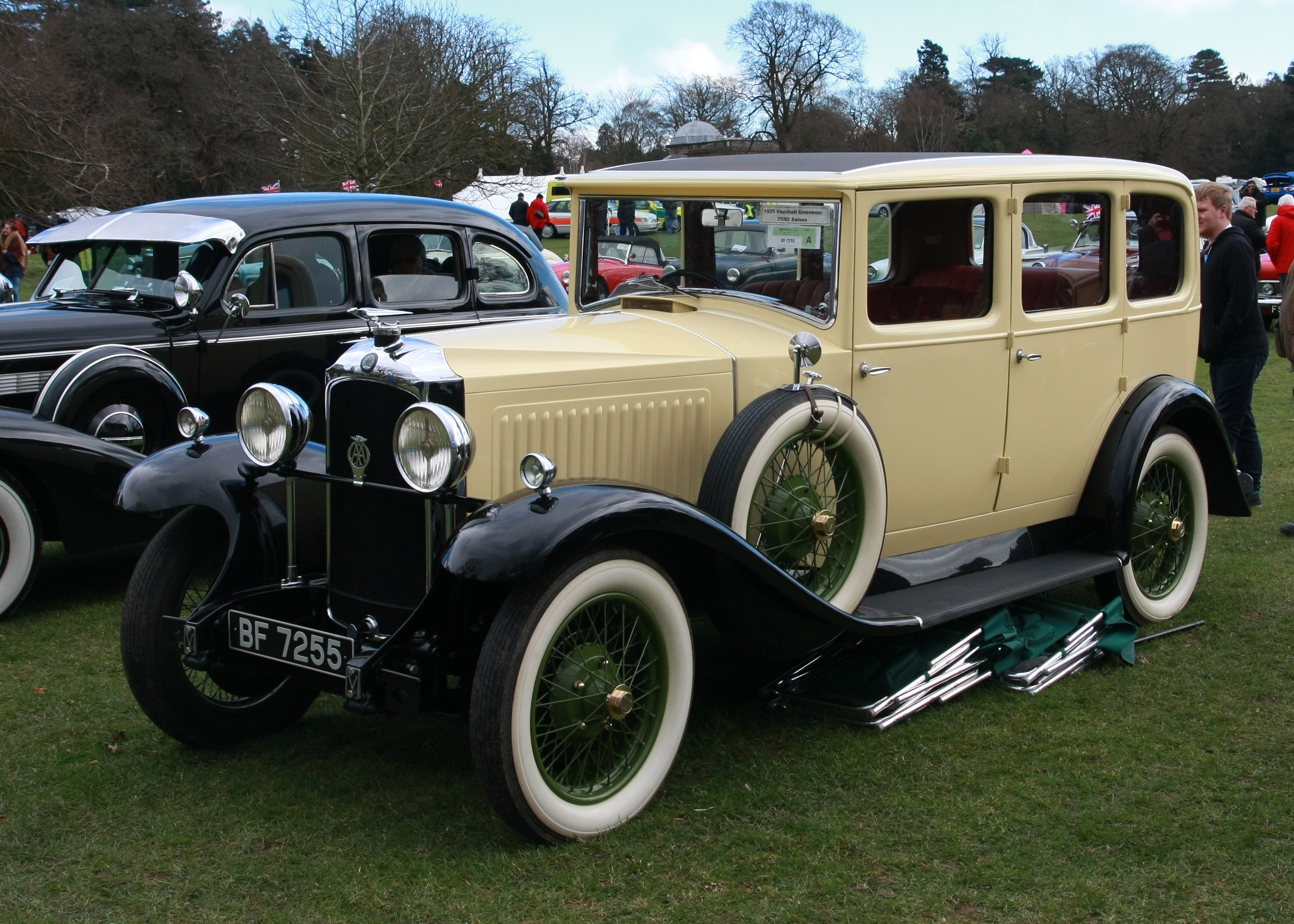
Saloon body by Grosvenor Carriage Co (1929)

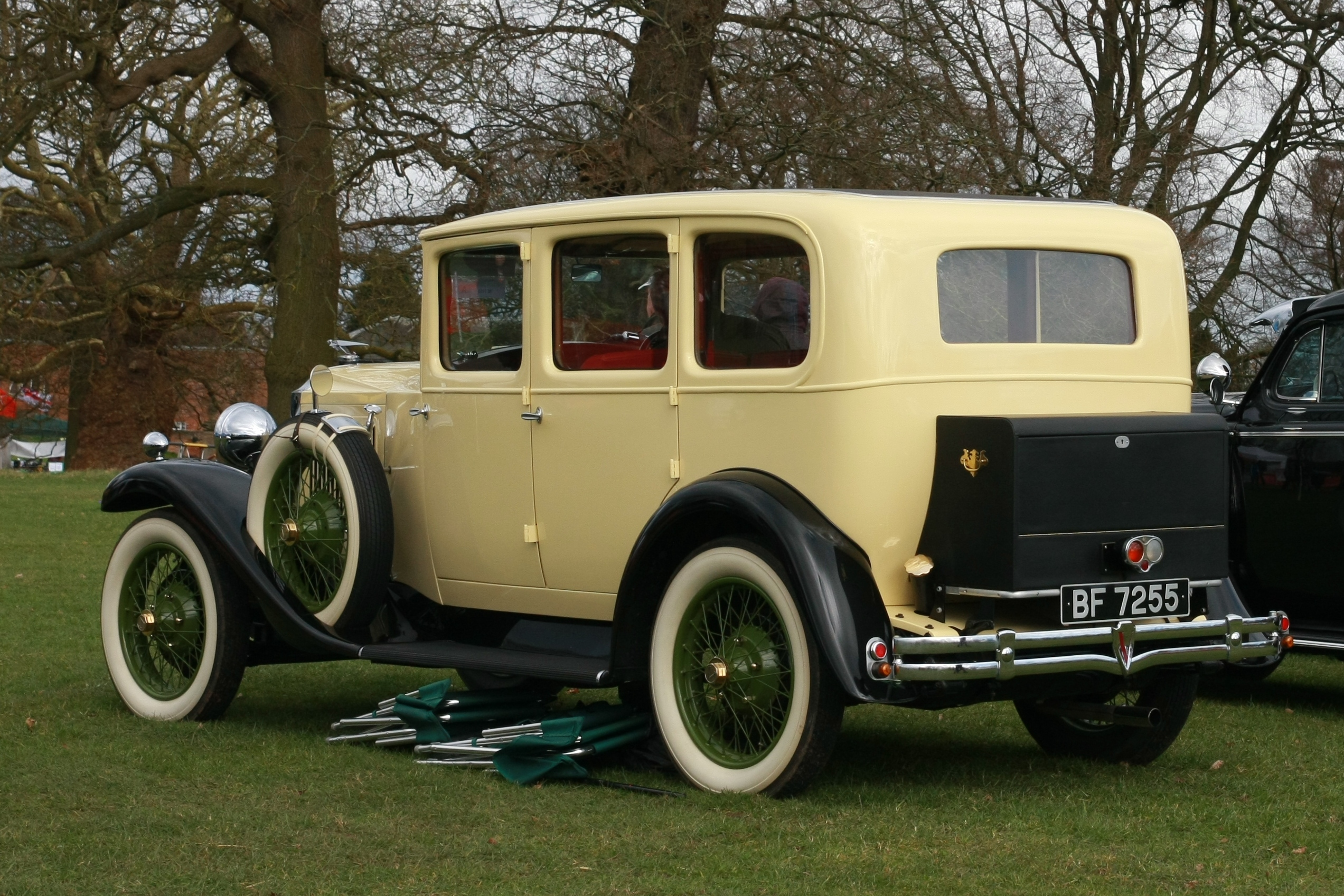

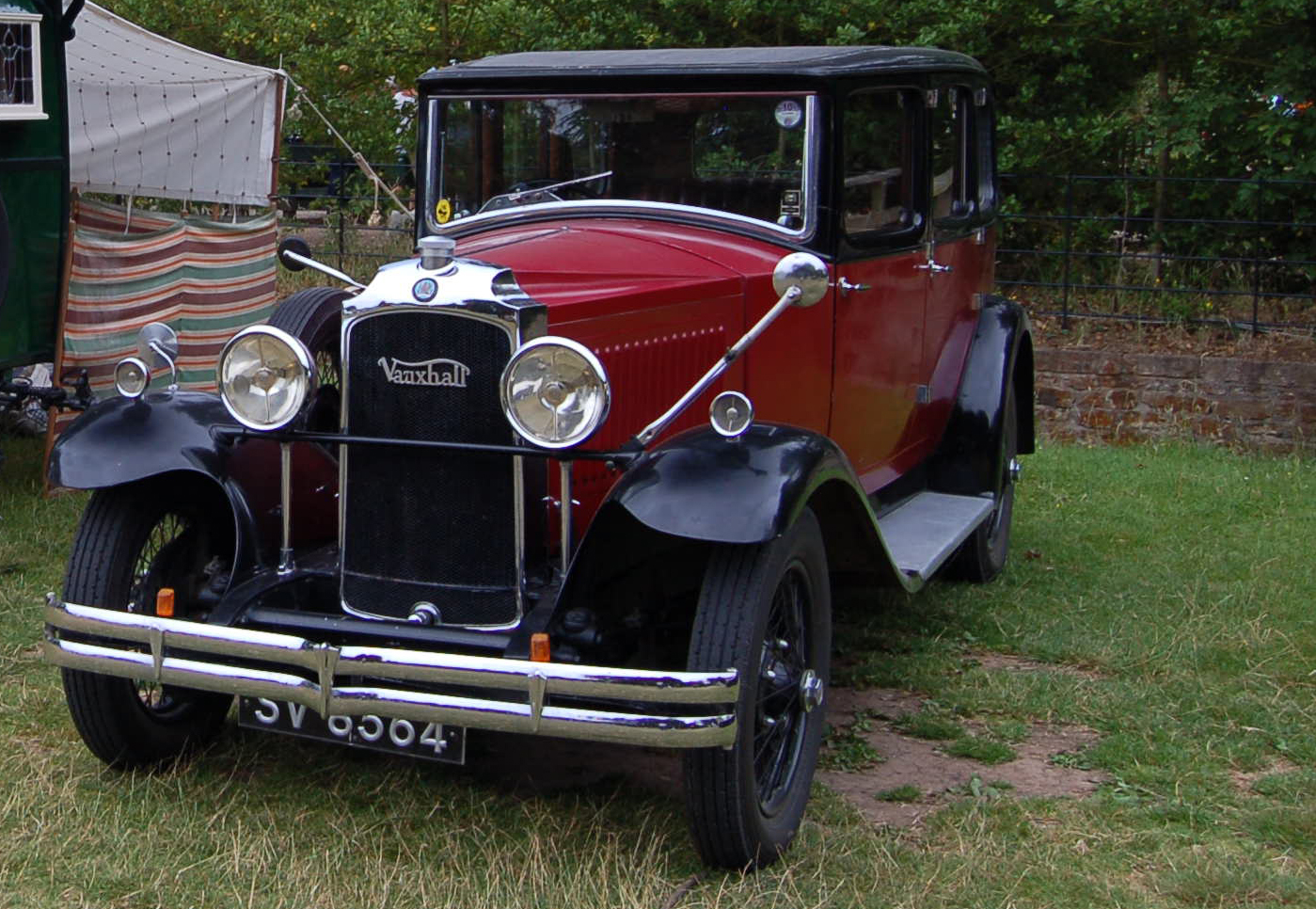
1929 Saloon

=== Controls ===
The position of the handbrake and change-speed levers has been changed. A new shape of handbrake lever is now on the right side of the driver but allows entry through that doorway. The change-speed lever is now in the centre of the car and is of the flexible type working in an invisible gate. It has very short travel, allowing three passengers in front.

== Catalogued bodies ==
10 October 1928

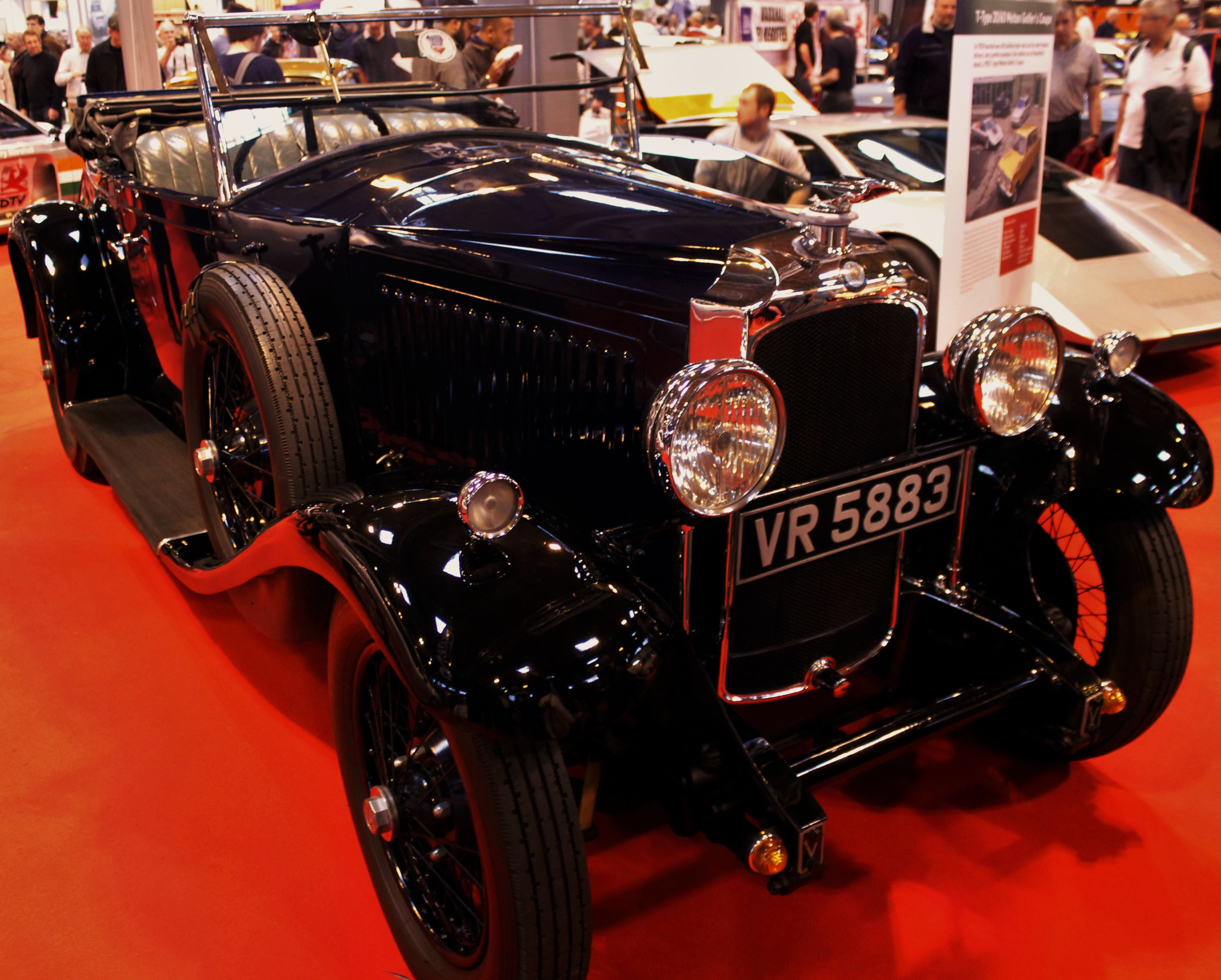
Melton golfer's drophead coupé

- Princeton tourer 5-seater £495
- Bedford saloon £520
- Bedford enclosed limousine £545
- Melton 2-seater £525
- Velox fabric saloon £555
- Grafton coupé cabriolet £630
- Kimberley saloon £650
- Kimberley enclosed limousine £675
- Kimpton saloon £675

== New for 1930 ==
Engine: the crankshaft now has seven bearings with a larger surface area and the crank pins are now bored to reduce weight. A new higher level air cleaner is fitted. There is a mechanical fuel pump to draw petrol from the tank at the rear, powered by a drive taken from the camshaft. The engine is now mounted on rubber. The exhaust manifold is now in one piece and passes gases towards the back of the engine.
Chassis frame: strengthened
Suspension: longer rear springs and hydraulic dampers are now fitted
propeller shaft: now has metal in place of fabric joints – required by higher shaft speeds
Lighting: twin-filament long-range head lamps are fitted and an automatic reversing light, lights are controlled from the centre of the steering wheel
Body: the front wings are now more streamlined

Hurlingham, a sports two-seater, not available as a chassis, has an engine with a higher compression ratio and a 4.18 : 1 back axle (standard 4.73 : 1).

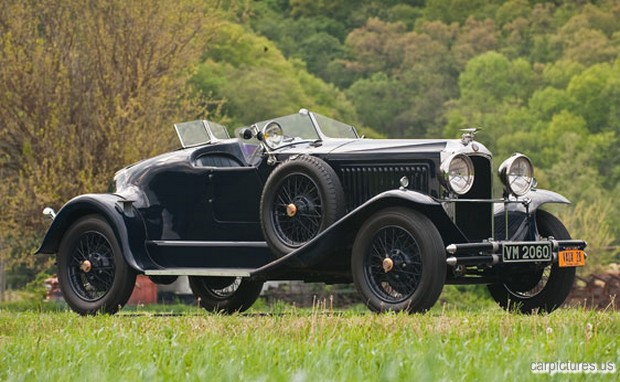
Hurlingham 2-seater 1930

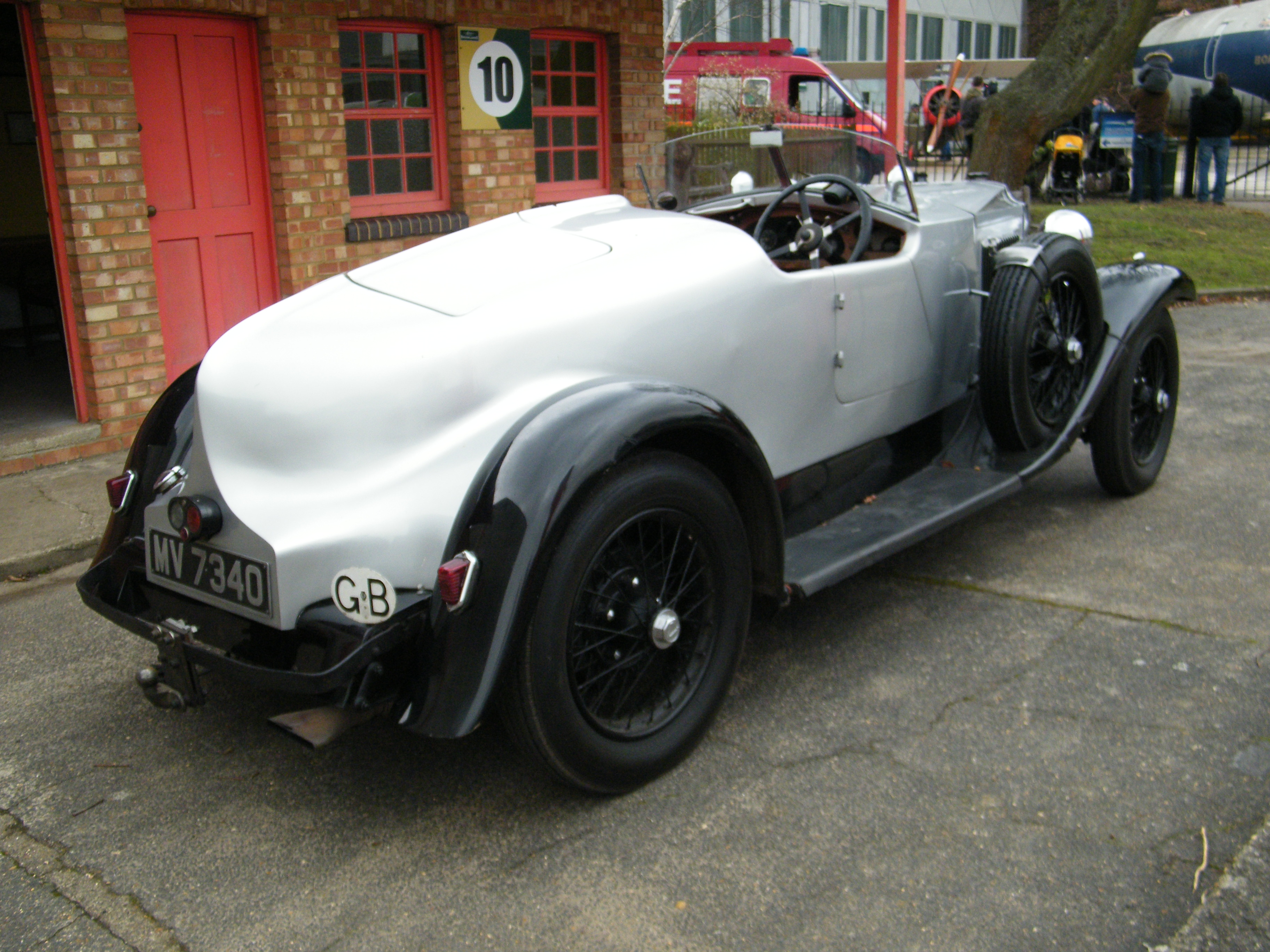
Hurlingham 2-seater 1930

== Vauxhall Eighty ==
Vauxhall 80
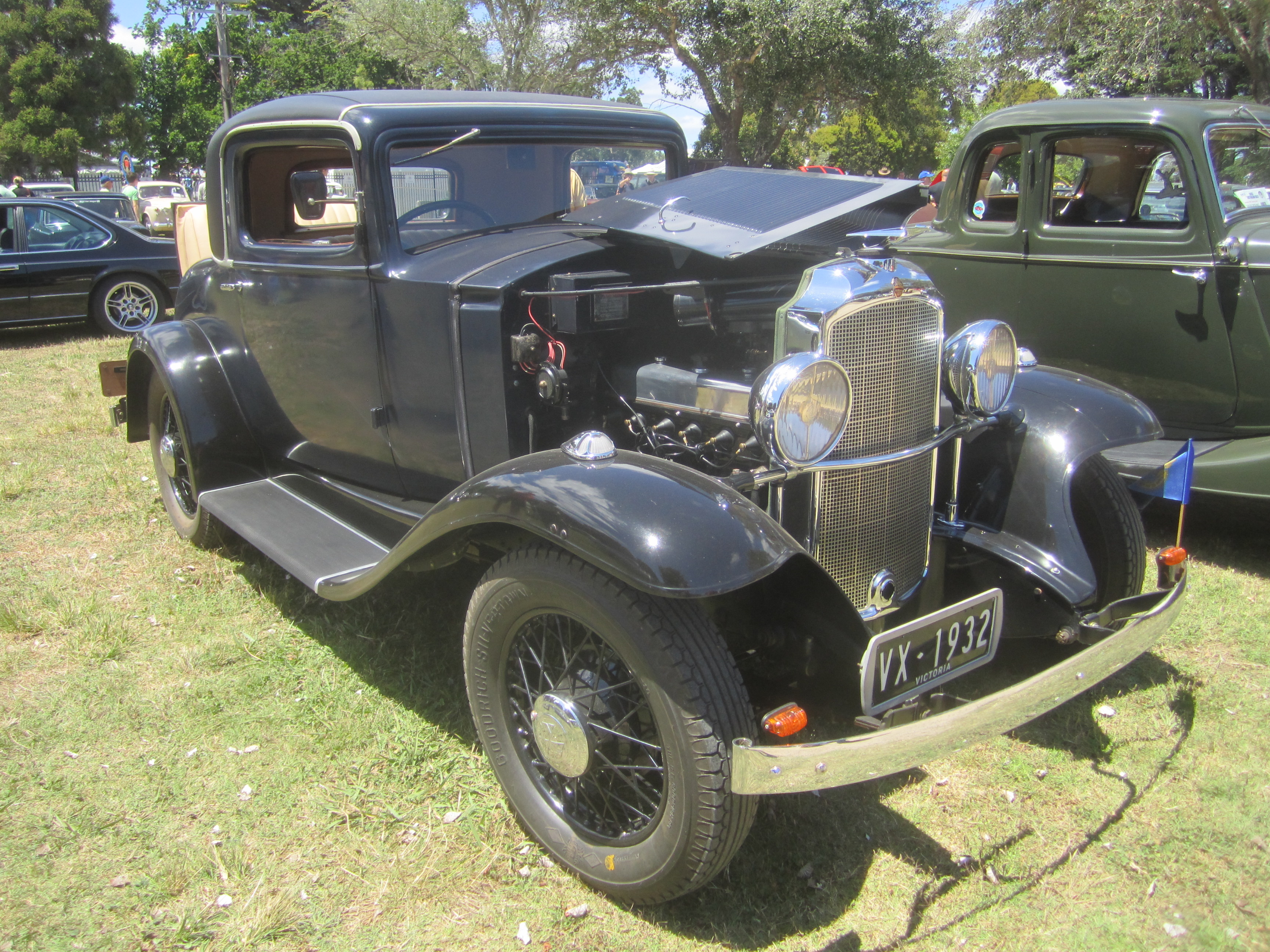
- Silent Eighty Kingston Coupé 1932 quieter engine and gearbox, rubber mounts for body

Overview
- Manufacturer: Vauxhall Motors Limited
- Production: 1930–1933
- Assembly: Luton U.K.

Body and chassis
- Class: medium
- Body style: saloon fabric saloon coupé (x2); 7-seater limousine special sports chassis only also supplied chassis only for own bodywork, short or long wheelbase
- Layout: Front-engine, rear-wheel-drive layout

Powertrain
- Engine: I6; T-Type 202 cu in (3,317 cc)
- Transmission: all strengthened to cope with increased torque Silent 80 constant mesh 3rd gear made available October 1931

Dimensions
- Kerb weight: 1,727 kg (3,808 lb) 34 cwt; chassis only 1,270 kg (2,800 lb) 25 cwt

Chronology
- Predecessor: Vauxhall 20-60 – see this page
- Successor: Vauxhall Big Six

T-80 engine

Overview
- Manufacturer: Vauxhall Motors Limited

Layout
- Configuration: inline 6
- Displacement: 3,317 cc (202 cu in)
- Cylinder bore: 80 mm (3.1 in)
- Piston stroke: 110 mm (4.3 in)
- Valvetrain: new enlarged overhead valves, three-bearing camshaft now driven by triple roller chain
- Compression ratio: increased

Output
- Power output: 62 bhp at 3000 rpm Tax rating 23.8 h.p.

Chronology
- Predecessor: Vauxhall 20-60 – see this page
- Successor: Vauxhall Big Six

The Eighty was announced for the opening of the 1930 Motor Show on 20 October 1930 – and probably overshadowed by their two-week-old new Cadet – with the display of two new models, the Richmond saloon and the Westminster 7-seater limousine. The new larger engine detailed below had several refinements.

=== Modified engine with increased power ===
The T-80 enlarged six-cylinder was now rated 23.8 hp for tax purposes. Bore had been increased by 5mm to 80mm and capacity was now 3,317 cc. Power was increased by 15 per cent and it was now 62 bhp at 3,000 rpm. Valves had been increased in diameter and the mechanism lightened. The camshaft was now driven by triple roller chain from the crankshaft. The dynamo had been switched to the left hand side and was now driven by an additional v-belt from the fan pulley. The four-point rubber suspension of the engine had been improved and to meet the higher compression the starter had been made stronger.

The full transmission line had also been strengthened. Small modifications have been made to the brakes.

=== Catalogue October 1930 ===
- Richmond saloon £495 formerly £540, sliding roof £10 extra
- Kingston Sportsman's Coupé £535 formerly £595
- Grafton Coupé £575 formerly £660
- Grosvenor 7-seater limousine £650 formerly £695 – formerly known as the Westminster

A Velox fabric saloon £495 was added to the catalogue in early 1931
Then a Westminster 7-seater Limousine £695 returned in addition to the Grosvenor

=== Road test ===
"The engine was exceptionally pleasing, quiet, well balanced at all speeds, flexible with fine acceleration . . . the lower gears might be quieter . . ." – reported The Times's motoring correspondent – "the four-wheel brakes were above reproach . . . The car travels smoothly, steering . . . steady yet very light."

== Vauxhall Silent Eighty ==
On 14 October 1931 Vauxhall announced their Silent 80 with a quieter engine, constant mesh 3rd gear and quieter gearbox. Car bodies were now mounted on rubber blocks, and they were given a chromium-plated shell for the radiator, large hubs with chromium hubcaps and new body styles.

=== Catalogue October 1931 ===
Vauxhall Silent Eighty with Silent Third gear

- Richmond saloon £485 formerly £515, sliding roof standard on all models
- Kingston Coupé £495 formerly £541
- Velox semi-panelled saloon £535
- Kimberley saloon £595
- Newmarket 7-passenger saloon £685
- Grosvenor 7-seater limousine £695 sliding roof 310 extra

=== Road test ===
The previous correspondent from The Times, long an enthusiastic supporter of Vauxhall's 30-98 model, commented: "The saloon is not particularly fast . . . but it will do near 70 mph in top . . . lower gears are unusually free from hum and the quiet third is quiet". Otherwise he repeated his complimentary remarks of February 1931.
