= Vauxhall Cadet =

Vauxhall Cadet VY and export VX
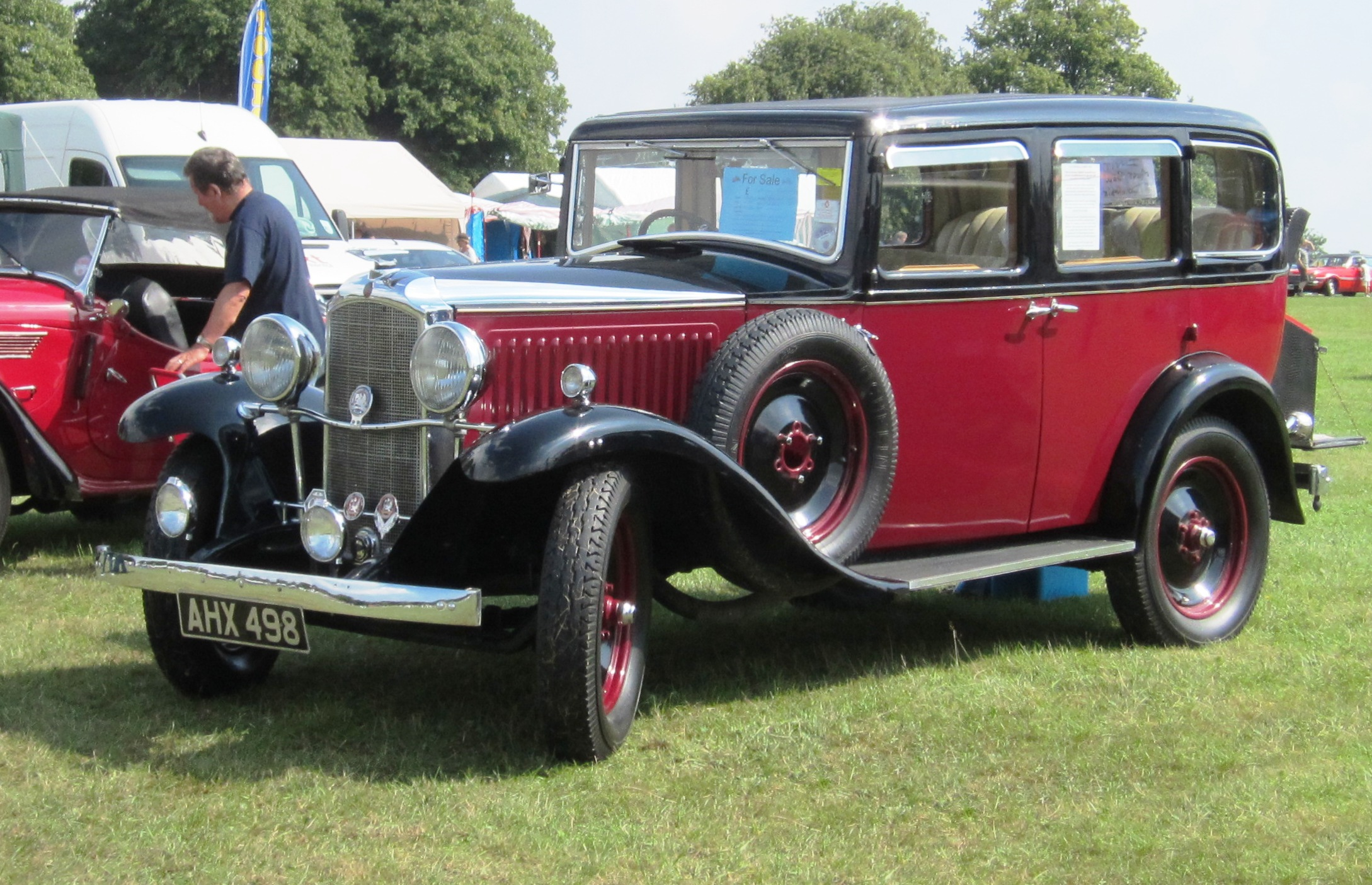
- Grosvenor saloon de luxe £325 1933

Overview
- Manufacturer: Vauxhall (General Motors)
- Production: quantity 9,691; 1930–33

Body and chassis
- Body style: saloon, 2-seater and two coupés catalogued also other bodies by Grosvenor and Salmons (Tickford), 2-door panel van
- Layout: FR layout

Powertrain
- Engine: 2,048 cc 6-cylinder in-line ohv 3,178 cubic centimetres (194 cu in) in the export VX
- Transmission: Single dry-plate clutch, three forward speed gearbox, synchromesh on 2 and 3 from end 1931 open propeller shaft with Hardy Spicer universals and final drive through a spiral bevel gear

Dimensions
- Wheelbase: 8' 11", 107 in (2,700 mm); Track 4' 8", 56 in (1,400 mm); Ground clearance 8½", 8.5 in (220 mm)
- Kerb weight: 26 cwt

Chronology
- Predecessor: None, a move downmarket
- Successor: Vauxhall Big Six 20 h.p. and Vauxhall Light Six

The Vauxhall Cadet VY is an automobile produced by Vauxhall from 1930 until 1933. It was an entirely new model announced by Vauxhall on 6 October 1930. The first Vauxhall priced below £300, it was intended to supplement the existing 24 h.p. 20-60 thereafter to be known as the Vauxhall Eighty. When exported it was usually supplied with a 27 h.p. engine and named VX. The first truly new Vauxhall since General Motors' purchase of the business in 1925, it was an American-style car with certain local amendments.

The mascot on the Cadet's radiator cap became the (two-dimensional) BOAC Speedbird logo.

== Synchromesh gearbox ==
The first British car fitted with a gear-box "embodying the now famous Synchro-Mesh principle", a system of gear change making every driver an expert. Providing a faultless shift-speed operation it was fitted to all Cadets from late 1931.

== Body ==
The front seats are easily moveable. There is a ventilator in the scuttle. The rear-most glasses of the six side windows are fixed while the middle ones can be wound down more than half-way and the forward ones fully. The one-piece windscreen opens out fully. The spare wheel and tyre are in a well in the nearside front wing, tools in a locked cupboard under the bonnet. The metal panelled saloon can be had in three colours.

Pricing

Vauxhall Cadet standard saloon £280—or with sliding roof and protectoglass, £298
Two-seater, £295
Sports coupé, £298
Four-light coupé, £298

=== 1933 ===
For 1933 detailed refinements were made to provide more comfort and better appearance, "the bodies are more imposing and the cars look lower". Bonnet flutes, lamps and bumpers were chromium-plated. The saloon's rear seats were deeper and finer quality leather upholstery provided. An eddy-free roof front, anti-glare sloping windscreen and anti-dazzle dipping headlamps were fitted, and dual electric screenwipers replaced the single vacuum instrument.

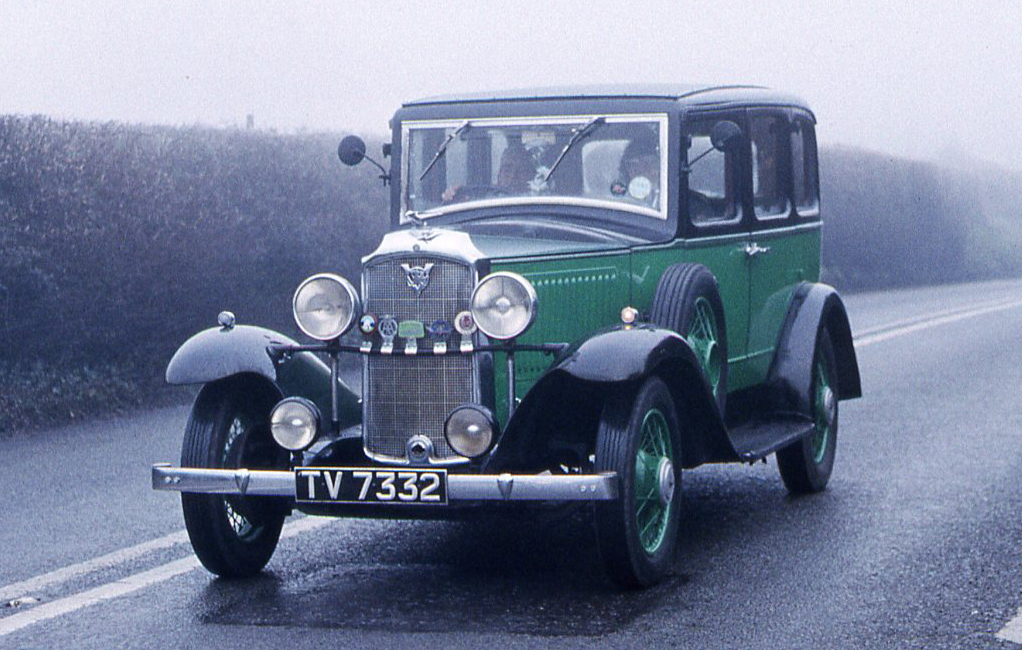
4-door saloon with flush-type sliding roof on weatherproof test 1993

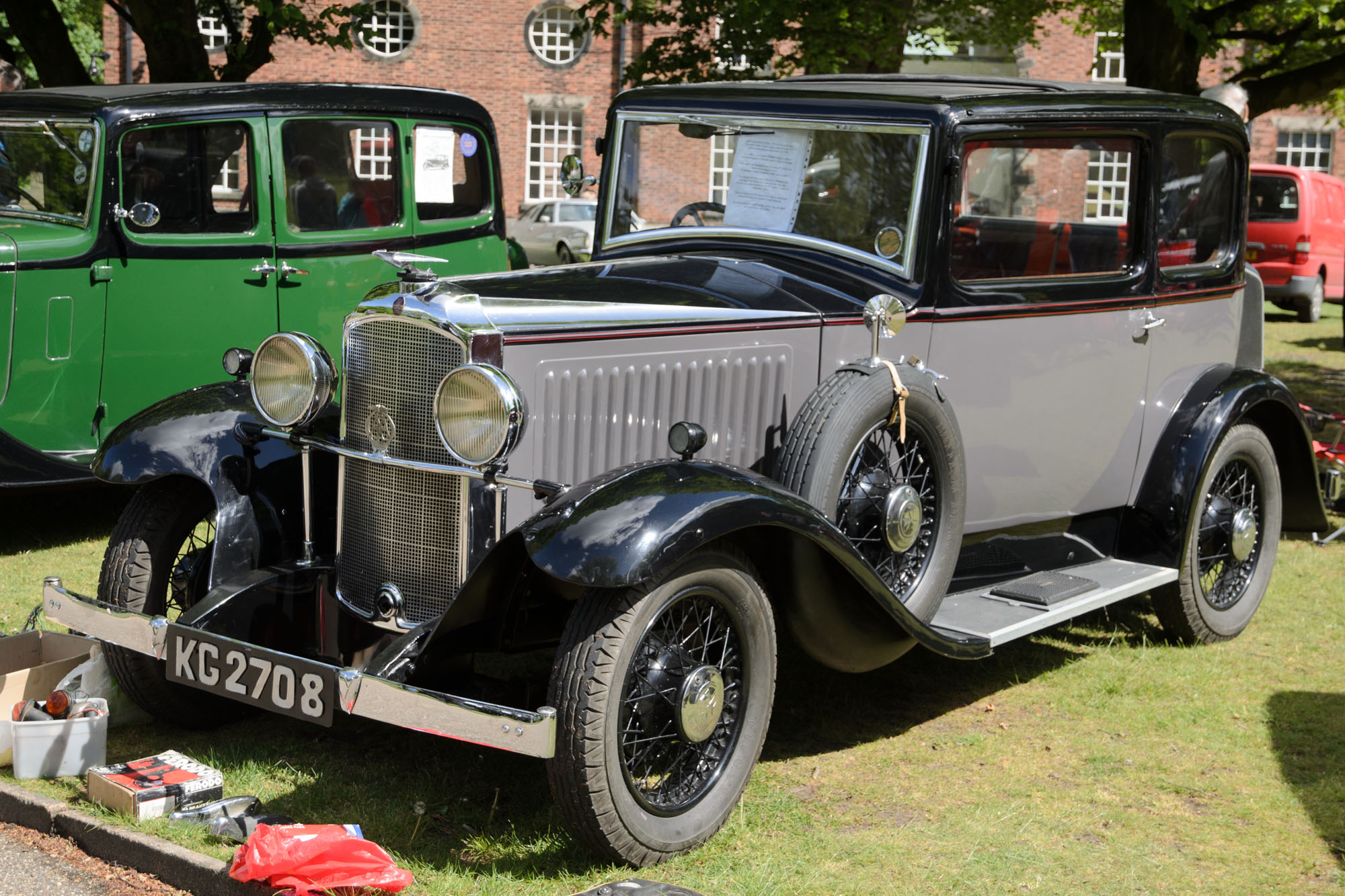
Fixed-head coupé 4-light 1933

4-door saloon with flush-type weatherproof sliding roof, £295
Grosvenor saloon de luxe £325
Tickford all-weather saloon, £335
Fixed-head coupé (2 or 4-light), £295
Romney 2-seater drop-head coupé, £325
Denton 4-seater drop-head coupé, £335

all prices ex Works

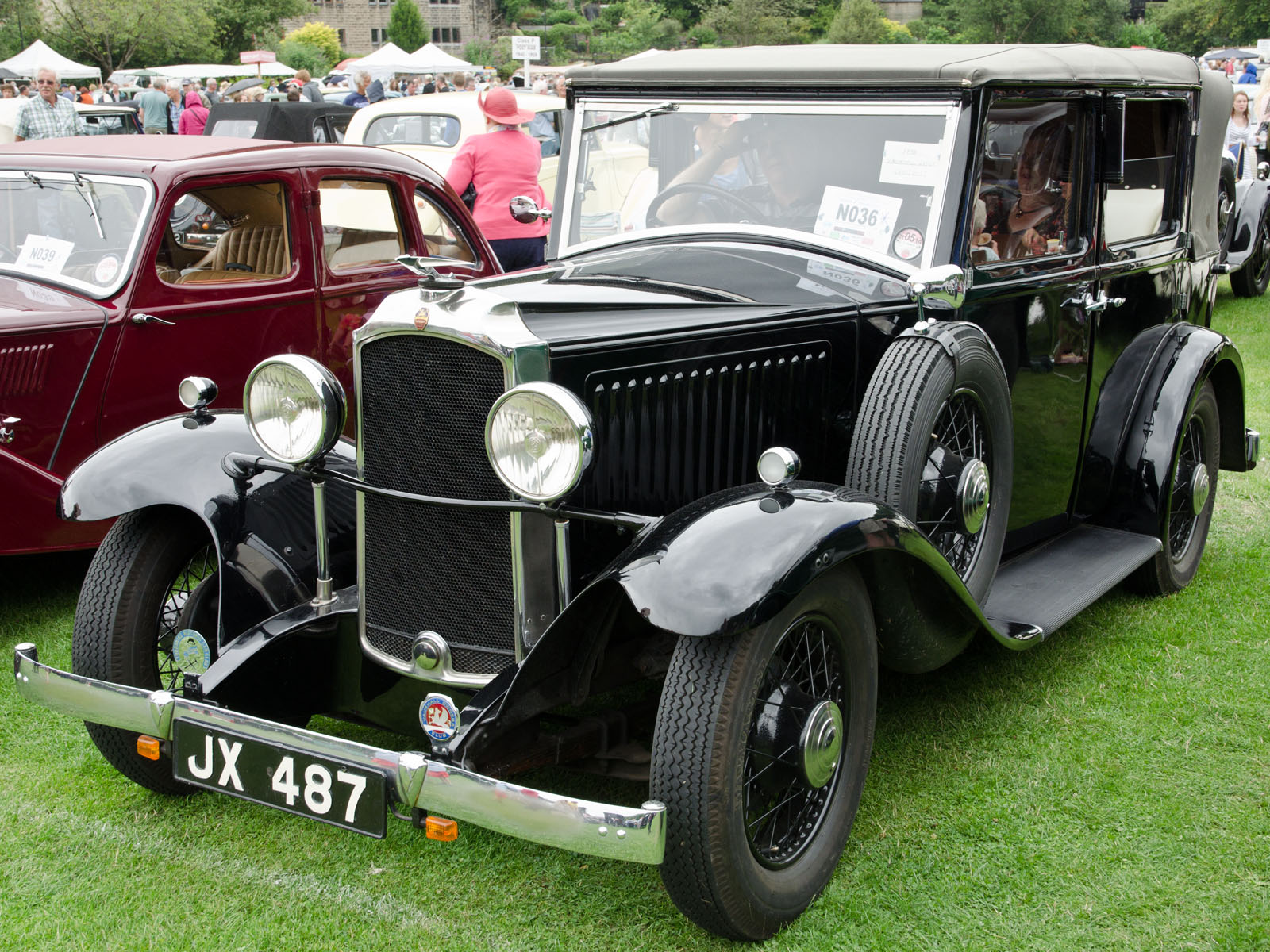
Tickford all-weather saloon (cabriolet) 1933

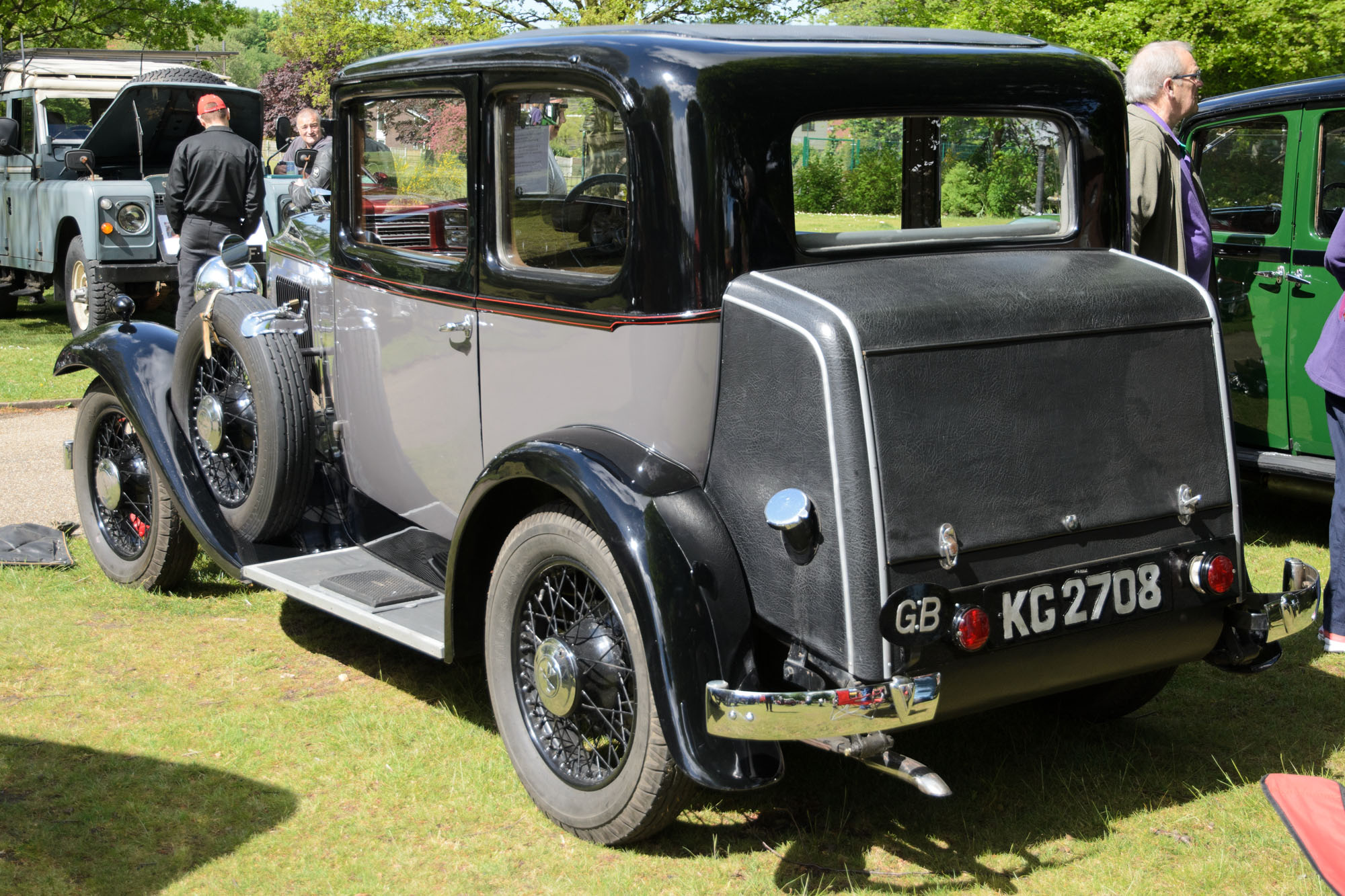
Fixed-head coupé 1933

"The Tickford model is a double purpose car, as the head can quickly and easily be wound down, and the windows lowered to make what is practically an open car. The windows can also be used up with the head back to avoid draughts or too much air. This Salmons body has stood the test of time in regard to utility and durability." The Times

Vauxhall Cadet VY engine

Overview
- Manufacturer: Vauxhall Motors Limited
- Production: 7758

Layout
- Configuration: 6-cylinder in-line
- Displacement: 2,048 cubic centimetres (125 cu in)
- Cylinder bore: 67.5 mm (2.66 in)
- Piston stroke: 95.25 mm (3.750 in)
- Cylinder block material: cast iron
- Cylinder head material: cast iron, aluminium pistons
- Valvetrain: ohv, operated by pushrods and rockers, valves have single springs
- Compression ratio: 5:1

Combustion
- Fuel type: Petrol
- Oil system: Forced
- Cooling system: Combined fan and impeller There is no thermostatic control

Output
- Power output: 42.0 bhp (31.3 kW; 42.6 PS) @ 3,300 rpm. Tax rating 16.9 hp

Chronology
- Predecessor: None
- Successor: Vauxhall Light Six 14 h.p.

Vauxhall Cadet VX engine

Overview
- Manufacturer: Vauxhall Motors Limited
- Production: 1933

Layout
- Configuration: 6-cylinder in-line
- Displacement: 3,178 cubic centimetres (194 cu in)
- Cylinder bore: 84.1 mm (3.31 in)
- Piston stroke: 95.25 mm (3.750 in)

Output
- Power output: Tax rating 26.3 hp

Chronology
- Successor: Vauxhall Big Six

== Engine ==
The 17 h.p. six-cylinder engine's overhead valves are operated by pushrods, the unit itself being suspended on rubber at four points damping out all vibration in top gear. The carburettor has interconnected choke and throttle controls ensuring immediate starting from cold. The radiator is in a shell with a stone guard. There is no thermostatic control within the engine cooling system. The three branch inlet manifold is on the near or left side of the engine above the four-branched square-sectioned exhaust manifold. Timing is by duplex roller chain. The crankshaft runs in four bearings.

A 26.3 h.p. engine is provided for export in a model named VX.

Better carburation was provided for 1933, which gave improved acceleration and better fuel consumption.

== Chassis ==
Steering is by cam and lever. Rear suspension is by half-elliptical, and practically flat, springs mounted beneath the axle and on rubber pads. Front springs are splayed. Single-acting hydraulic shock absorbers are employed in front and back. Bumpers are supplied fore and aft and there is a folding luggage grid.

Brakes are on all four wheels, they are half servo type and have part rods and part cables in front and cables behind. Rods are used for the handbrake.

Smaller wheels with larger tyres, heavier bumpers, smoother springing, improved shock absorbers were all improvements listed for 1933.

== Performance ==
The motoring correspondent of The Times described the engine as having an almost turbine-like silence and smoothness with beautifully responsive acceleration. Flexibility was demonstrated by "the ability to flash away from 3 m.p.h. in top gear into express train speed in a few seconds without the least suspicion of transmission jerk". Reportedly in the teeth of a high wind maximum speed was 65 m.p.h. Petrol consumption was good, about 23 mp.pg. and oil consumption about 900 m.p.g.

"At its price this car provides luxury motoring in the very best sense and within the reach of people of moderate means."

26 h.p. Cadet VX cars exported to Australasia, probably c.k.d.

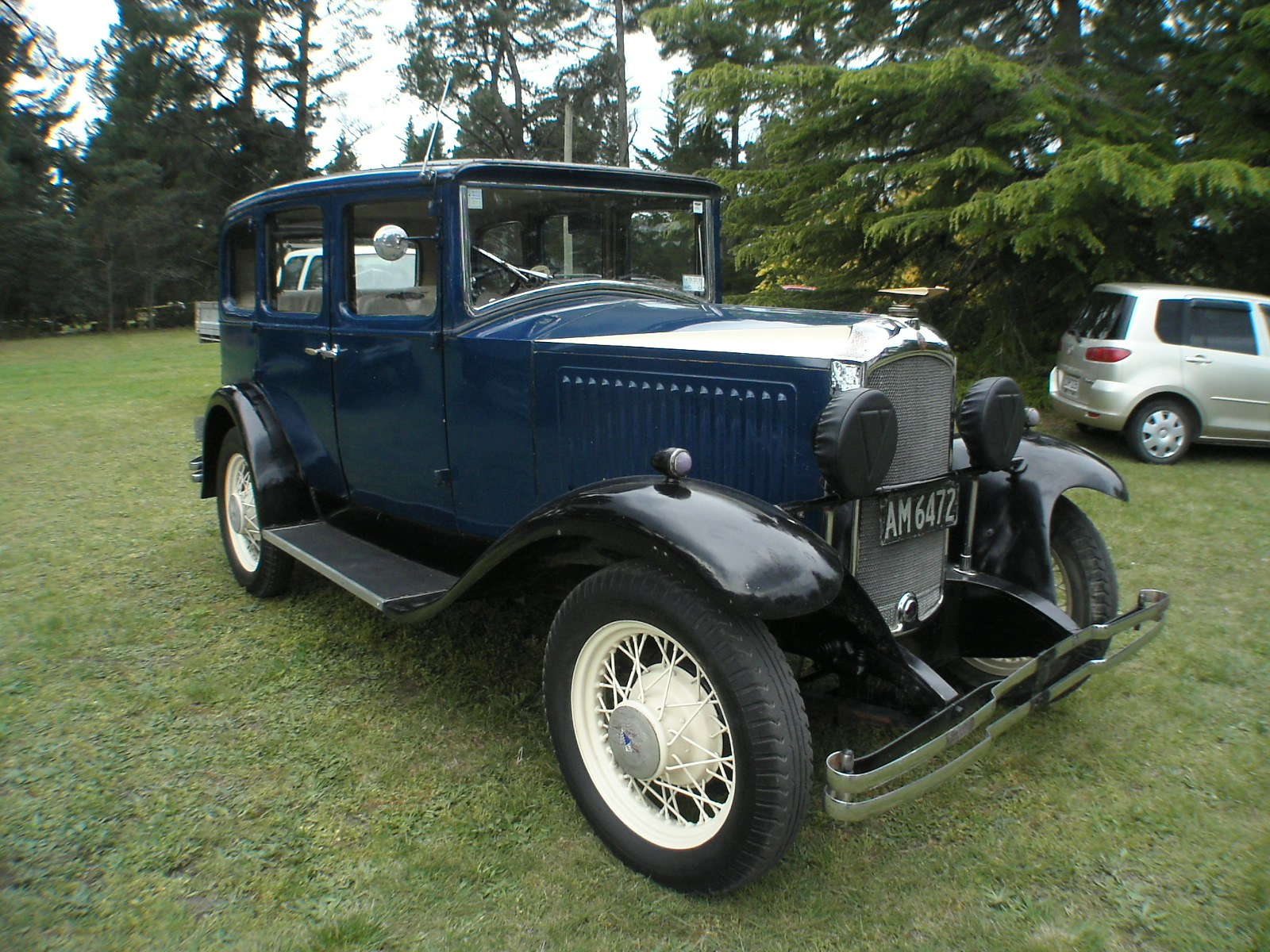
Standard saloon 1931

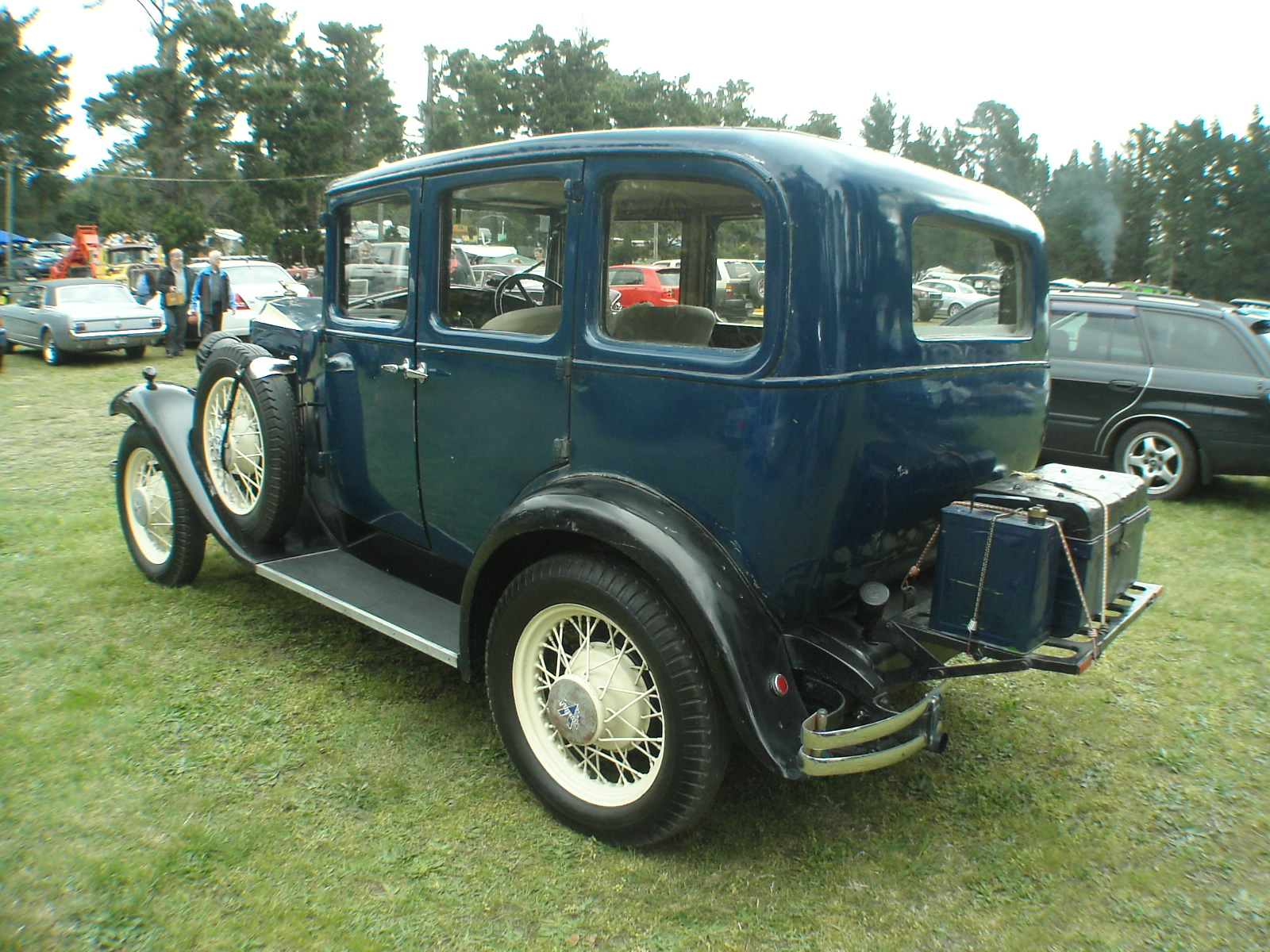
rear view

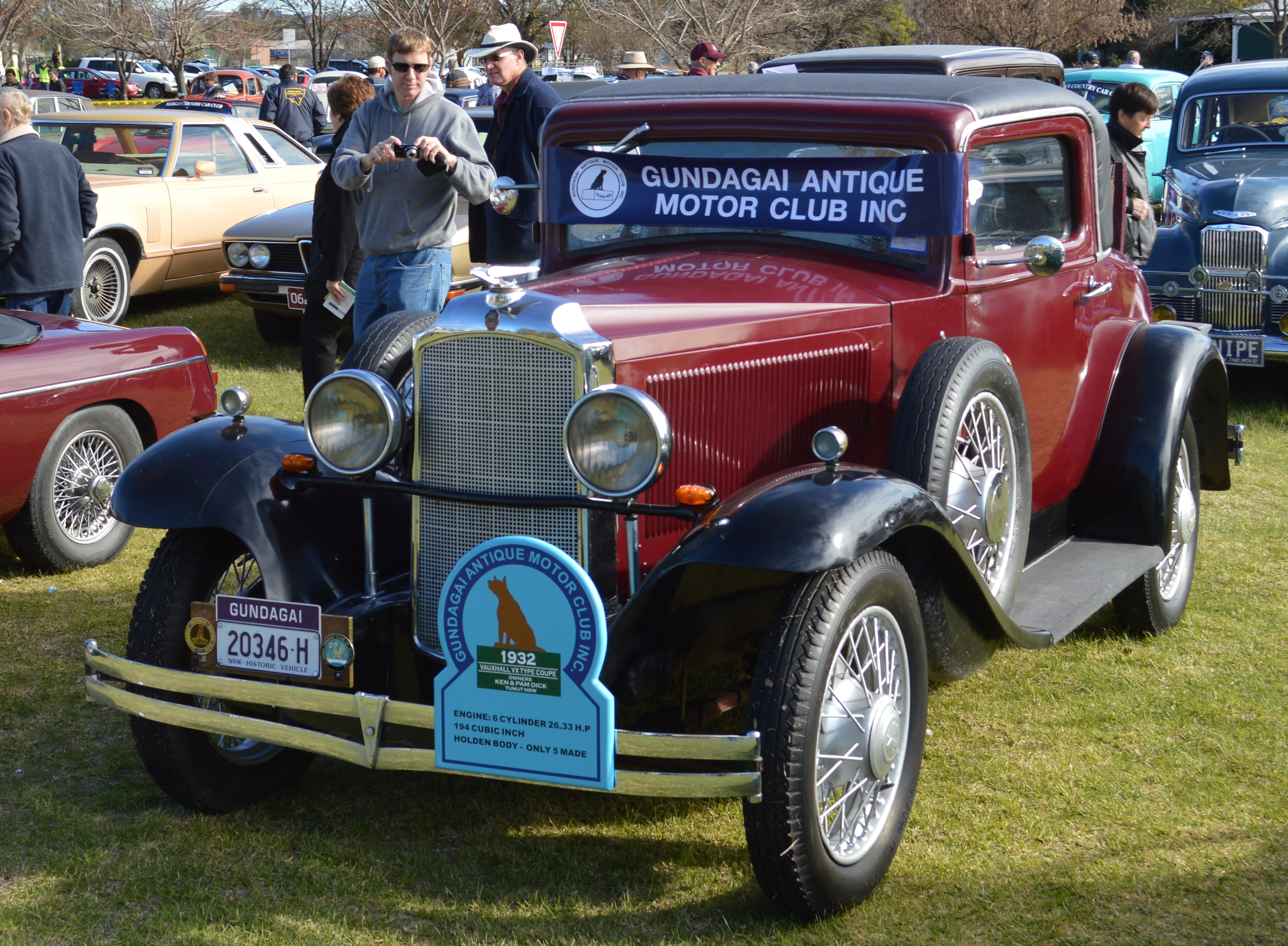
Sports coupé 1932
body by Holden
