= Vauxhall 14-40 =

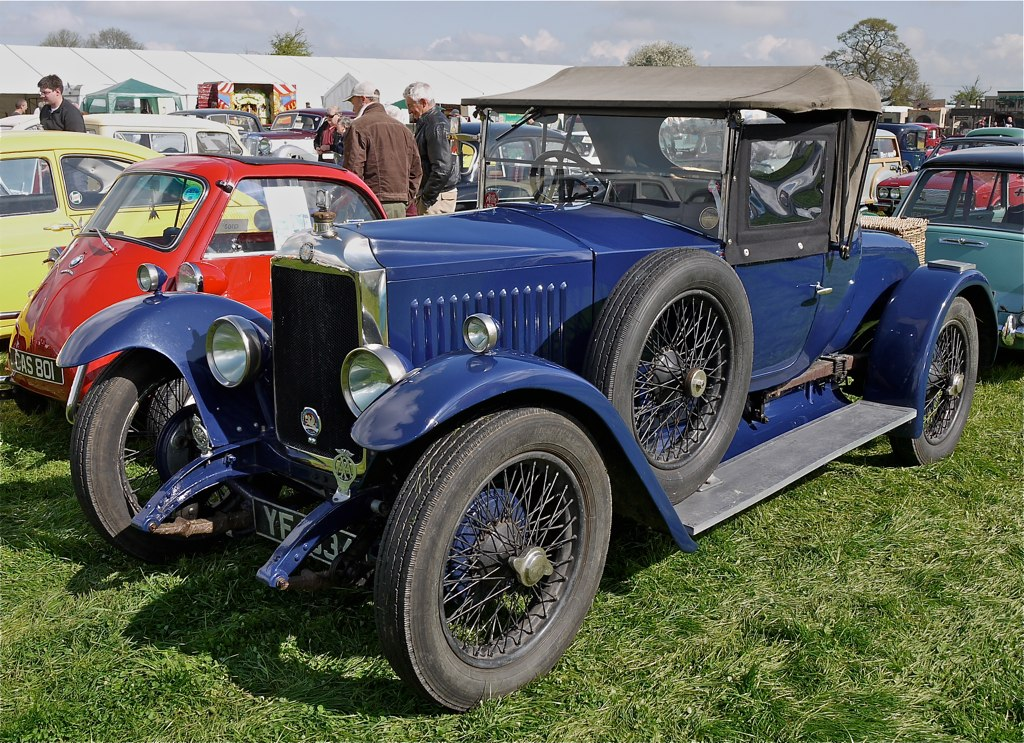
- 1927 Vauxhall 14-40 LM type with Melton coachwork.

Overview
- Manufacturer: Vauxhall
- Also called: Vauxhall 14; Vauxhall M Vauxhall LM
- Production: 1922 to 1927
- Assembly: United Kingdom, Australia
- Designer: C E King

Body and chassis
- Body style: 4-door and 2-door roadster saloon and limousine coupe landaulette
- Layout: FR layout

Powertrain
- Engine: 2297cc I4
- Transmission: 3-speed manual (L type); 4-speed manual (LM type)

Dimensions
- Wheelbase: 117 in (3,000 mm)
- Length: 166 in (4,200 mm)
- Curb weight: 70 in (1,800 mm)

Chronology
- Predecessor: Vauxhall 30-98
- Successor: Vauxhall 20-60

The Vauxhall 14 is an automobile which was produced by Vauxhall in the United Kingdom from 1922 to 1927.

As well as United Kingdom manufacture, knock-down kits were assembled in Australia.

== Model M ==
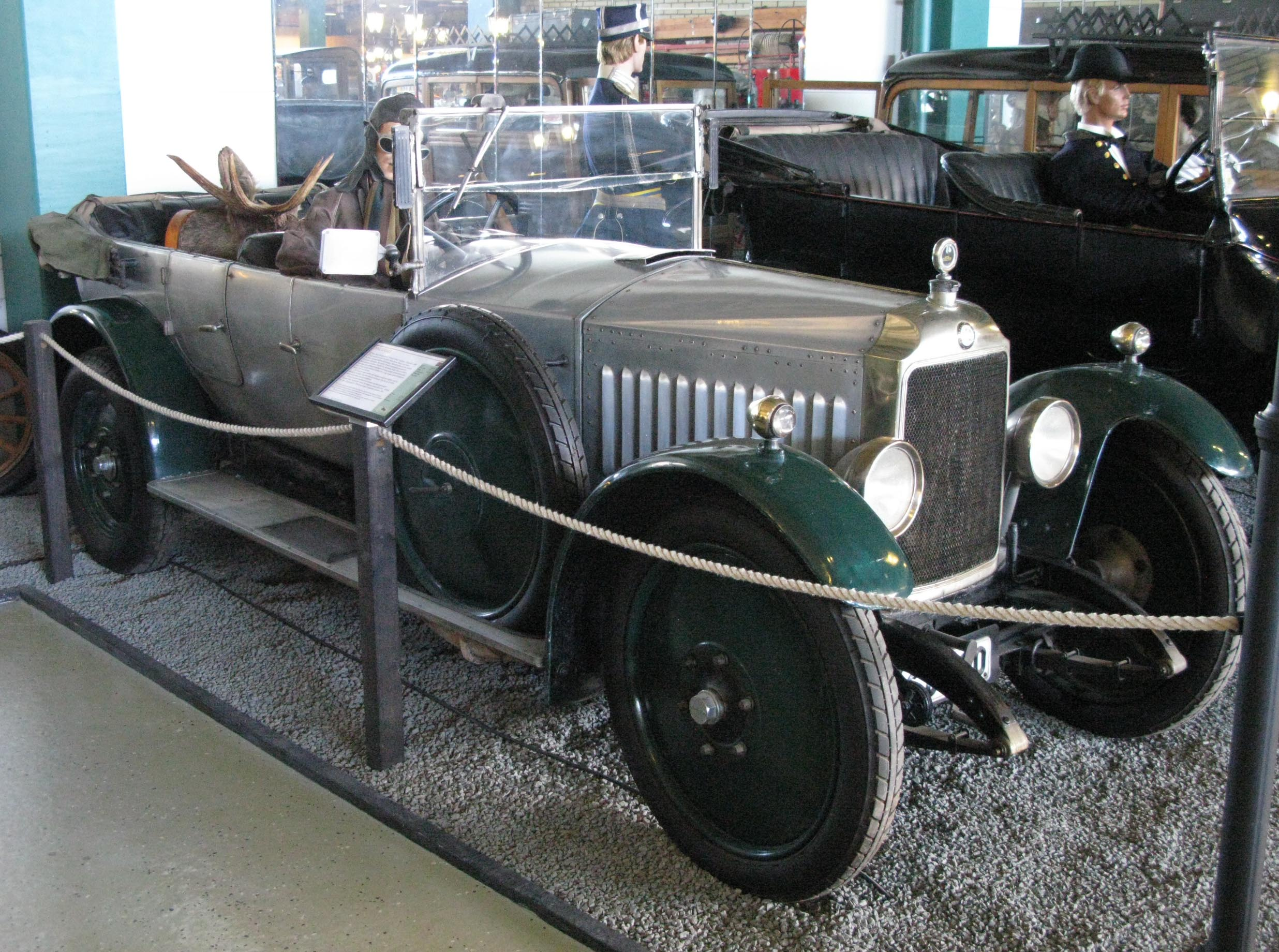
1922 M type with Princeton 4-door body and disc wheels.

First shown at the 1921 London Motor Show, the car reached the public in 1922.

The new car, designed by Clarence King, had a four-cylinder, 2297 cc side-valve engine mounted in-unit with a three-speed transmission. The separate chassis had semi-elliptic leaf springs at the front and cantilever springs at the rear. Brakes acted on the rear wheels only with a separate pair of shoes for the handbrake. Disc type wheels were fitted.

The car was said to be capable of reaching nearly 60 mph (97 km/h) and return 28 mpg_{‑imp} (10 L/100 km; 23 mpg_{‑US}).

=== Body styles ===
- 2 door Melton tourer
- 4 door Princeton tourer
- Bedford, Norfolk and Wyndham saloons
- Kimberley limousine
- Wyvern landaulette
- Grafton coupe

Approximately 1800 cars were produced.

== Model LM ==
In 1924 the LM version appeared with a higher compression engine developing 40 bhp (30 kW) and four-speed transmission. Wire-spoked wheels replaced the disc ones. Front-wheel brakes were added in 1926.

In 1924 the 14-40 with Princeton tourer body cost £595.

Approximately 3500 cars were produced.
