= Grosvenor Carriage Company =

British coachbuilder

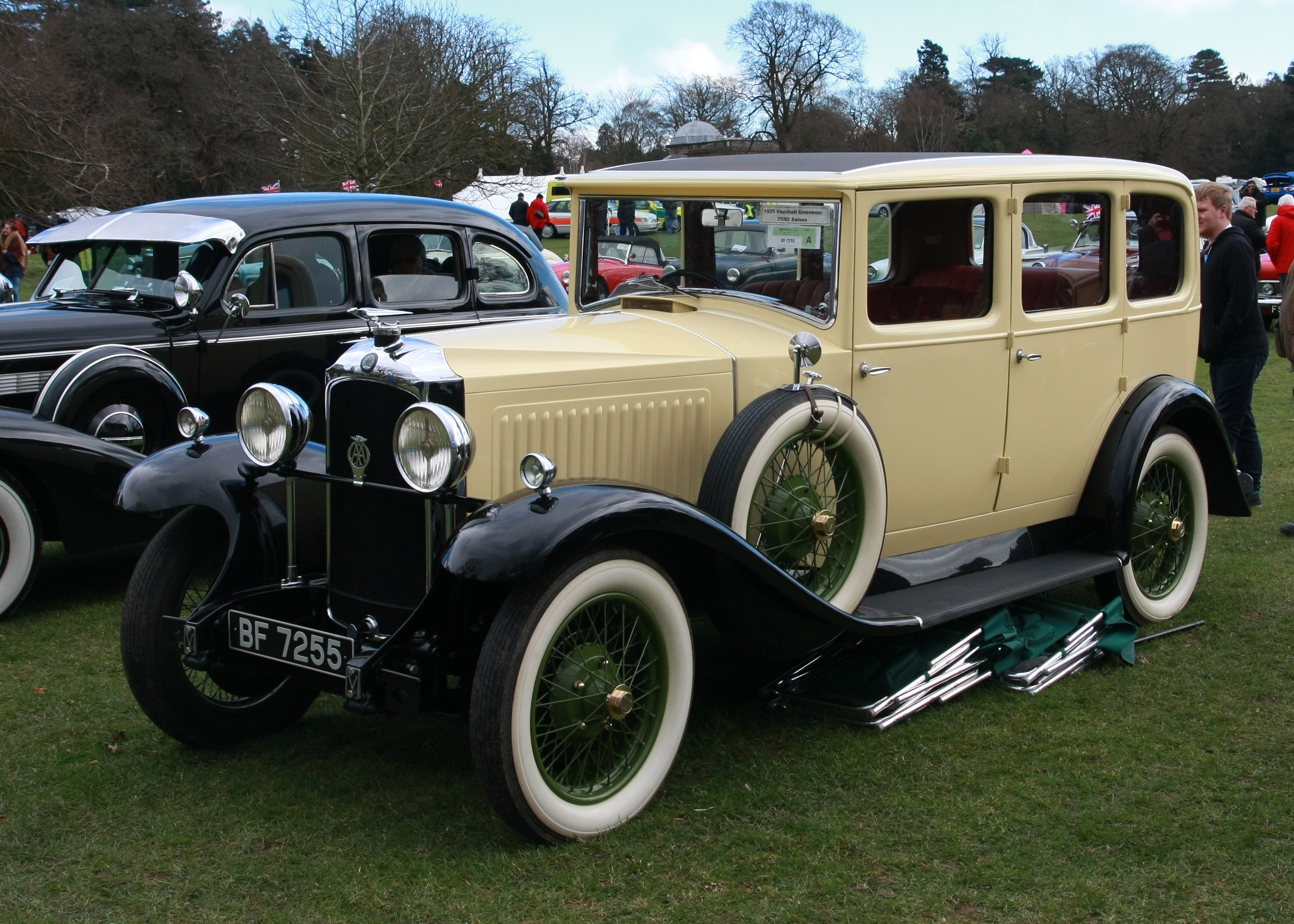
A 1929 Vauxhall 20/60 with coachwork by Grosvenor

The Grosvenor Carriage Company Ltd was a British coachbuilder founded in around 1910 and based in Kilburn in North West London. They ceased operations sometime in the 1960s.

With premises at Welbeck Works, Willesden Lane, London NW6, Grosvenor gained a reputation in the years up to World War I for high quality coachwork on leading makes of car including Rolls-Royce.

During World War I they made ambulance bodies.

By 1920 they had joined up with Shaw & Kilburn who were the main Vauxhall dealer in London and although they still supplied coachwork on other chassis their main customer was from then onwards Vauxhall. From the late 1920s Grosvenor became responsible for building most if not all or Vauxhall's specialist bodies and in 1929 were responsible for the Hurlingham and Melton bodies on the Vauxhall 20-60. From 1932 it seems they only built for Vauxhall, effectively becoming their in-house coachbuilder.

All luxury coachbuilding stopped in World War II. This was not the end for Grosvenor as in 1954 they were advertising a 10-passenger bus and also a pick-up conversion of a Bedford van. Their final offering seems to have been in 1956 with an estate-car conversion of the Vauxhall Velox.

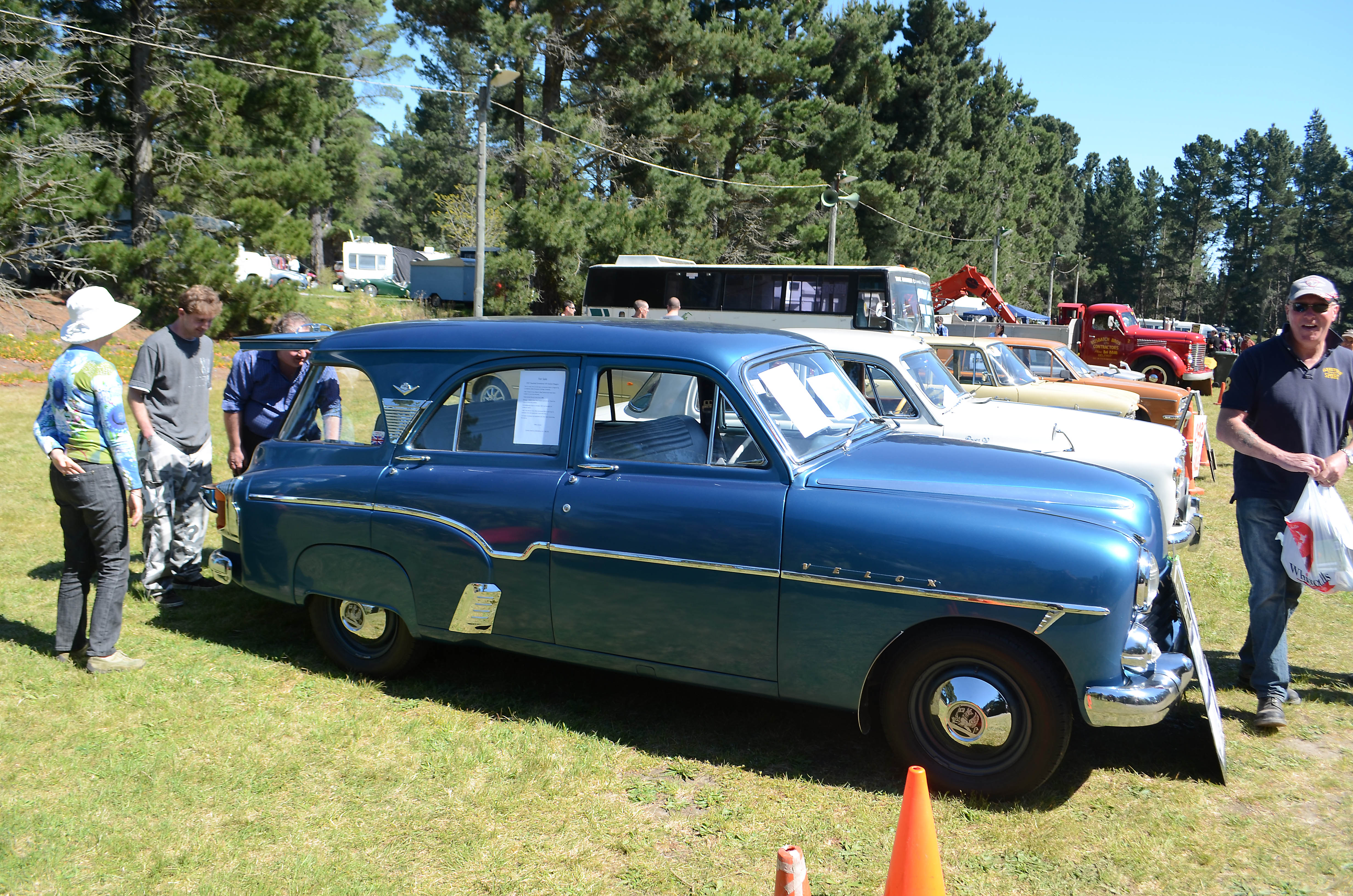
1957 Vauxhall Velox

By the late 1950s or early 1960s the name seems to have been allowed to lapse.
