= IBC Vehicles =

English automotive manufacturing company

IBC Vehicles Limited

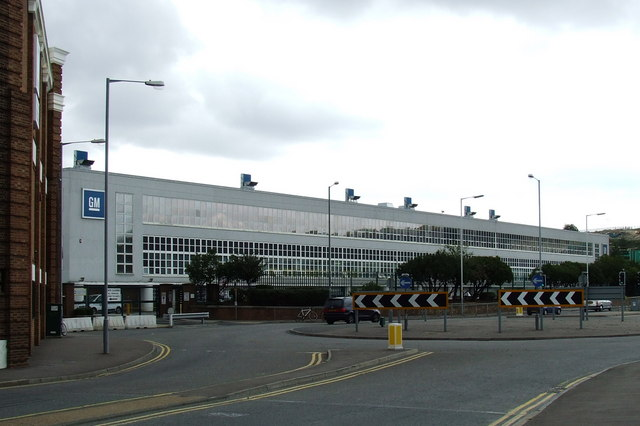
- Type: Private
- Industry: Vehicle manufacturing
- Predecessor: Bedford Vehicles
- Founded: 1986; 40 years ago
- Defunct: April 2025; 19 months ago
- Successor: Stellantis Pro One
- Headquarters: Luton, Bedfordshire, United Kingdom
- Key people: Christopher Parfitt, Managing director
- Products: Commercial vehicles
- Revenue: £493,263,000 (2013)
- Operating income: £20,331,000 (2013)
- Net income: £17,450,000 (2013)
- Total assets: £93,282,000 (2013)
- Number of employees: 923 (2013)
- Parent: Stellantis

IBC Vehicles Limited was a British automotive manufacturing company based in Luton, Bedfordshire, and since 2021, a wholly owned subsidiary of the multinational corporation Stellantis. Its principal operation was the Vauxhall Luton assembly plant, which produced light commercial vehicles under the Citroën, Opel, Peugeot, Vauxhall, Fiat Professional, and Toyota brands. Historically, the plant produced Bedford, Isuzu and Suzuki branded light commercial vehicles. Production ceased in April 2025 and the factory underwent demolition in the autumn of 2026.

== History ==
IBC Vehicles has its roots in Bedford Vehicles, the truck and bus manufacturing subsidiary of Vauxhall.

In 1986, the Bedford van factory in Luton was reorganised as a joint venture with Isuzu, resulting in the formation of IBC Vehicles (Isuzu Bedford Company Limited). Its first product was the Bedford Midi, a badge engineered clone of the Isuzu Fargo midsize panel van, replacing the ageing Bedford CF. The Suzuki-based Bedford Rascal microvan followed in 1987.

In 1992, IBC produced European versions of the Isuzu MU (Opel/Vauxhall Frontera Sport) and the Isuzu MU Wizard (Opel/Vauxhall Frontera), alongside a range of Renault-designed vans sold under the Opel, Vauxhall, and Renault brands. The Bedford name was dropped, and the Frontera A was produced from 1992 to 1998, followed by the Frontera B from 1998 to 2004.

In 1998, General Motors bought out Isuzu's stake in IBC and renamed the plant GM Manufacturing Luton (GMM Luton).

In 2017, GM sold Opel, including Vauxhall and the Luton plant, to Groupe PSA. Groupe PSA later merged with Fiat Chrysler Automobiles to form Stellantis in January 2021.

== Products ==
=== 2001–2014 ===
GMM Luton produced the Opel/Vauxhall Vivaro A, Renault Trafic II, and Nissan Primastar. High-roof versions were built by Renault in Barcelona due to height constraints at the Luton plant. By 2011, the plant had produced 1.25 million vehicles since 2001, with a production capacity of 100,000 but output of 68,000 annually.

In 2011, Opel/Vauxhall confirmed that production of the 2013 Vivaro would continue at Luton, while high-roof versions and the Renault Trafic moved to Sandouville, France.

=== 2014–2019 ===
In August 2014, the factory began producing the Renault Trafic III and the Vauxhall Vivaro. In July 2016, it added the Fiat Talento, followed by the Nissan NV300 in November 2016.

Between 2015 and 2019, Renault, Opel, Vauxhall, Nissan, and Fiat Professional announced that high-roof and left-hand-drive variants of the Trafic, Vivaro, NV300, and Talento would be built in Sandouville. Right-hand-drive, low-roof versions continued production in Luton.

Several of these vehicles, including the Renault Trafic III, Opel/Vauxhall Vivaro B, Nissan Primastar II and Nissan NV300, were transformed post-production (e.g., interior conversions, wheelchair accessibility, stickers) at Renault Pro+'s Heudebouville Qstomize site in Normandy, in France, while the Fiat Talento II was processed in Italy.

In late 2018, production of the Renault Trafic, Fiat Talento, Nissan NV300, and the Vivaro moved to Sandouville.

=== 2020–2025 ===
In early 2020, the plant began producing the Vauxhall Vivaro C, Citroën Dispatch and SpaceTourer, Peugeot Expert and Traveller, and Toyota ProAce and ProAce Verso. In May 2022, the factory also began producing the Fiat Scudo and Fiat Ulysse.

Production ceased in April 2025.

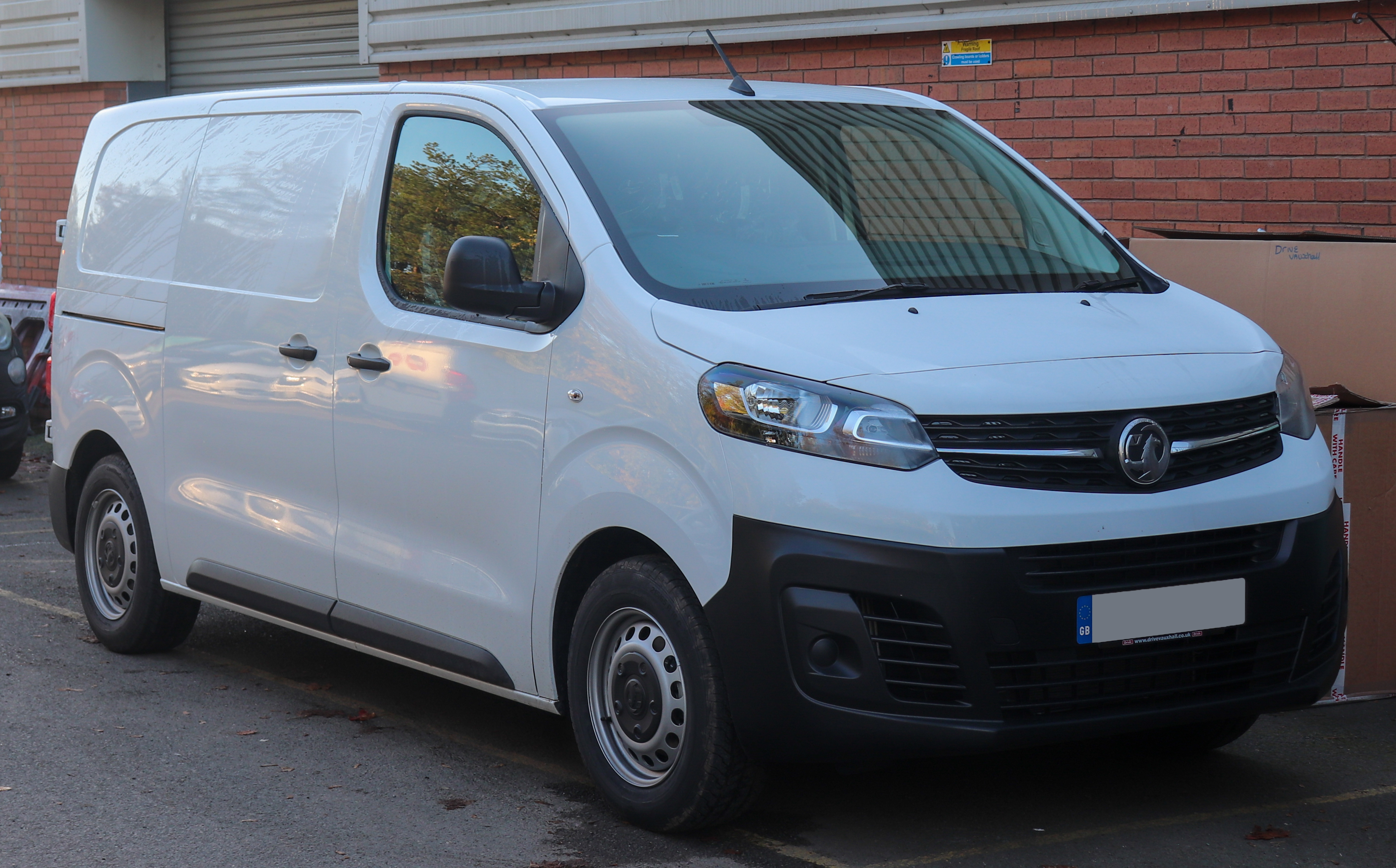
Vauxhall Vivaro

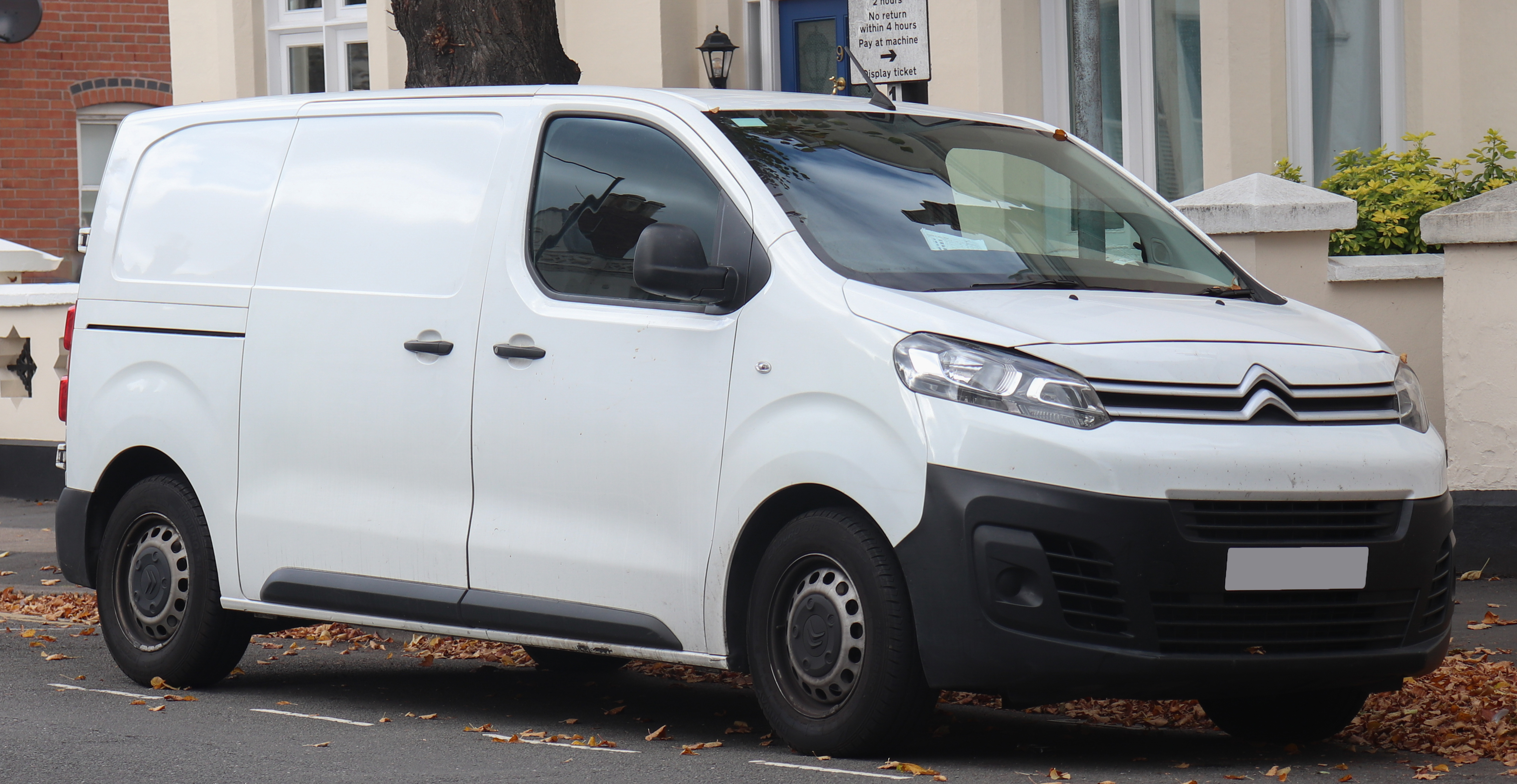
Citroën Dispatch

== Notable people ==
Irish poet and TV presenter Pat Ingoldsby worked in the factory in the 1960s.
