= Vauxhall Luton =

Motor vehicle manufacturing facility

Coordinates: 51.8763°N 0.3904°W

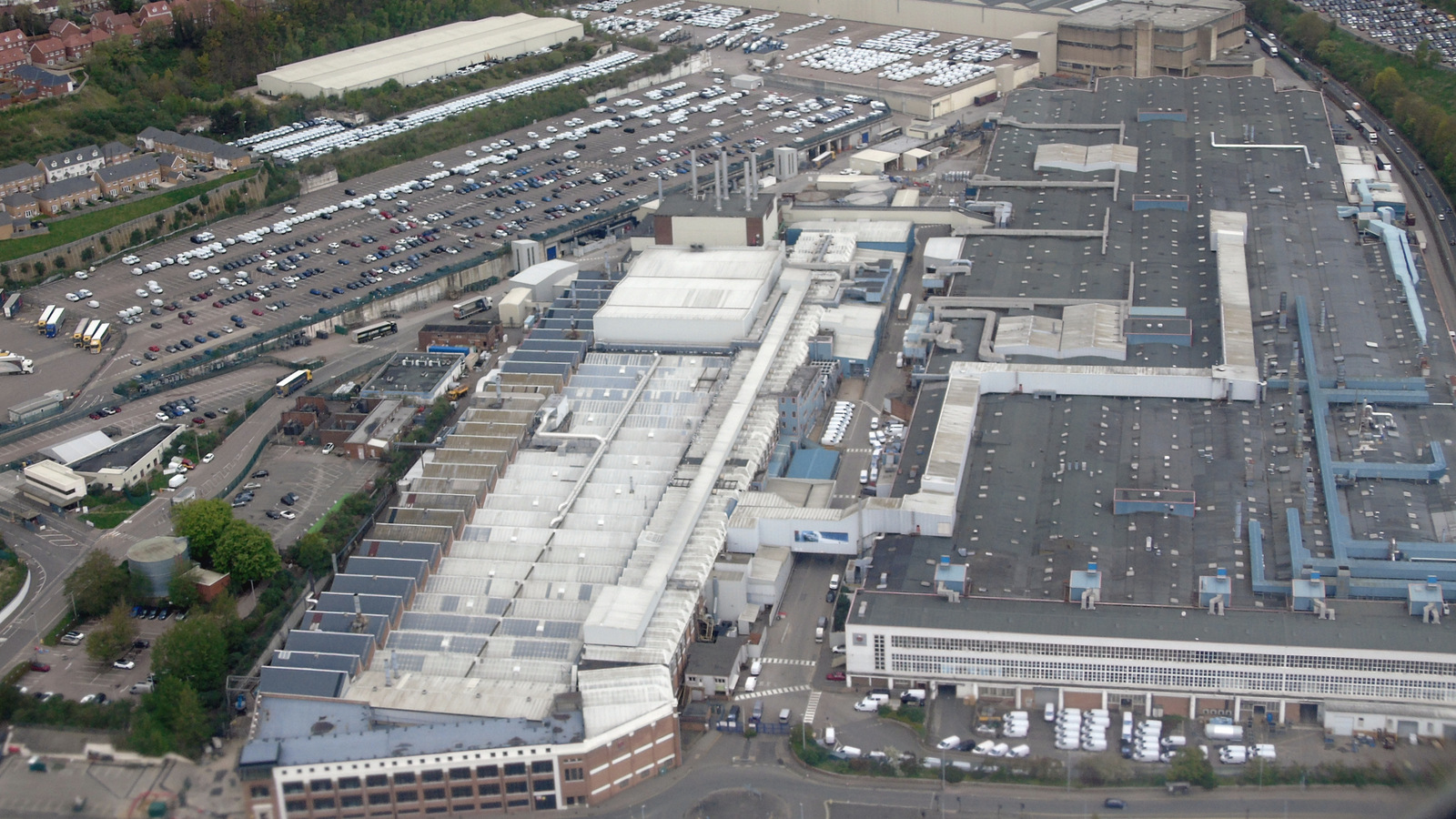
Vauxhall Luton factory from the air in 2024, shortly before closure

The Vauxhall Luton plant was a motor vehicle manufacturing facility located in Luton, Bedfordshire, England. Operational from 1905 to 2025, it produced passenger cars and light commercial vehicles under the Vauxhall, Opel, Bedford, Renault, Nissan, Peugeot, Citroën, Fiat Professional, and Toyota brands. Its closure in March 2025 marked the end of 120 years of vehicle production in Luton.

== History ==
=== Early years ===
Vauxhall Motors originated in South London as Vauxhall Iron Works, which began building cars in 1903. Seeking expansion space, the company relocated to Luton in 1905, where it established a factory on Kimpton Road.

In its early years, the plant produced successful models including the 9HP and the 18HP, followed by the iconic 30/98 sports car. During the First World War, the factory supported the war effort with D-Type staff cars and established a munitions plant producing shell fuses.

=== General Motors era ===
In 1925, General Motors acquired Vauxhall, launching a new chapter in the plant's history. Commercial vehicle production began in 1931 with the establishment of Bedford Vehicles, which became a major manufacturer of trucks and vans.

During the Second World War, the plant built around 5,640 Churchill tanks, 250,000 Bedford trucks, steel helmets, jerrycan sides, and aircraft components. It was bombed by the Luftwaffe in August 1940, killing 39 workers.

=== Postwar years ===
Postwar, the plant resumed car production with models like the Wyvern and Velox, and in later decades produced high-volume cars such as the Viva, Cavalier, Carlton, and Vectra. At its peak, the factory employed over 37,000 people.

In the 1980s, Vauxhall launched a joint venture with Isuzu to form IBC Vehicles. The factory began building light commercial vehicles, including the Bedford Midi and Rascal, and later SUVs like the original Vauxhall Frontera.

In 1998, GM bought out Isuzu's share and renamed the plant GM Manufacturing Luton (GMM Luton).

=== Commercial vehicle focus ===
Passenger car production at Luton ended in 2002 with the final Vauxhall Vectra. From 2001 onward, the plant focused on vans, producing the Vauxhall Vivaro, along with rebadged versions for Renault, Nissan, Opel, and Fiat.

In 2017, GM sold Opel and Vauxhall to Groupe PSA. Following PSA's merger with Fiat Chrysler Automobiles, the plant became part of Stellantis in 2021. It continued producing vans under various brands, including Citroën, Peugeot, Fiat, and Toyota.

The 1.5 millionth Vivaro was built in June 2023.

== Closure ==
In November 2024, Stellantis announced the closure of the Luton plant and the transfer of UK light commercial vehicle production to Ellesmere Port, which was being converted into an electric van production facility.

The final vehicle—a Vauxhall Vivaro—was completed at 12:18 GMT on 28 March 2025.

=== Redevelopment ===
Following its closure, the site was sold to property developer Goodman for redevelopment into a £400 million commercial and industrial park.

== See also ==
- Bedford Vehicles
- Vauxhall Ellesmere Port
