= Bedford CF =

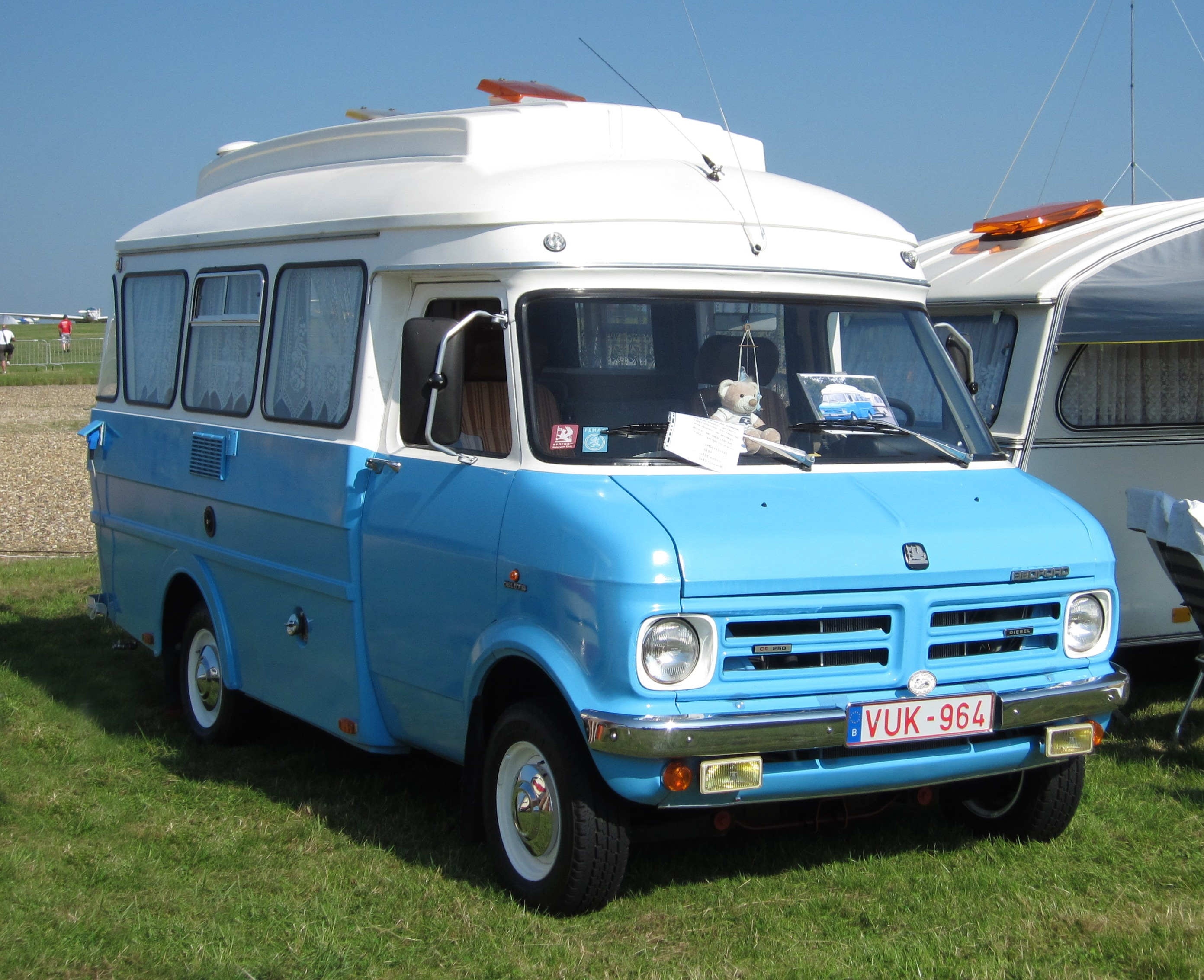

Overview
- Manufacturer: Bedford Vehicles
- Also called: Opel Bedford Blitz; GMC Griffon (United States)
- Production: 1969–1986
- Assembly: Luton

Body and chassis
- Class: Light commercial vehicle (M)
- Body style: Van
- Layout: Longitudinal front engine, rear-wheel drive
- Related: Bedford Dormobile

Powertrain
- Engine: Slant Four: 1.6 L; 1.8 L; 2.0 L; 2.25 L; 2.3 L; Holden Red I6: 2.85 L; 3.3 L; Holden V8: 4.2 L; 5.0 L
- Transmission: 3/4/5-speed manual; 3-speed automatic

Dimensions
- Wheelbase: 106–140 in (2,692–3,556 mm)

Chronology
- Predecessor: Bedford CA; Opel Blitz
- Successor: Bedford Midi

The Bedford CF is a range of full-size panel vans produced by Bedford - the commercial vehicles division of Vauxhall. The van was introduced in 1969 to replace the CA model, and was sized to compete directly with the Ford Transit, which had entered production four years earlier. Its design was similar to its American counterpart, the Chevrolet Van (1971–1995).

Bedford was a General Motors subsidiary, and in some markets outside the United Kingdom and Ireland the CF was sold through Opel dealers as the Opel Bedford Blitz from 1973 on when the original Opel Blitz was phased out. In other markets such as in Norway the CF retained its original name.

The CF was notable for being the last vehicle solely designed by Vauxhall when it was discontinued in 1986 (the last Vauxhall passenger car had been the HC Viva which had ceased production in 1979); with all Vauxhall cars by that point being essentially rebranded Opels.

The Bedford brand continued on certain badge engineered light vans and pick-ups from Isuzu and Suzuki, built under licence at the IBC Vehicles plant in Luton, before being retired in 1991 in favour of Vauxhall or Opel.

== CF ==
Introduced in November 1969 to replace the 17-year-old Bedford CA, the CF van variants soon became some of the most popular light commercial vehicles on British roads.

The CF could be specified with a hinged door in the side panel directly behind the passenger door, and it was generally with this layout that the van was also commonly used as a base vehicle for a caravanette.

The engine was the well-proven Slant Four engine which had been introduced for the Vauxhall FD Victor models in 1967. Apart from an increased engine capacity from 1.6 L (1,598 cc) to 1.8 L (1,759 cc) and from 2.0 L (1,975 cc) to 2.3 L (2,279 cc) in 1972, the power units remained unchanged. A four-cylinder 1.8 L (1,760 cc) Perkins diesel engine could be specified for an extra £130 (1969), while a larger 2.5 L (2,523 cc) version was used for heavier versions. These units were rated at 50 and 61 PS (37 and 45 kW; 49 and 60 hp) DIN. In 1976, a 2.1 L (2,064 cc) overhead camshaft (OHC) diesel engine from Opel replaced the outdated Perkins units.

In Australasian markets, the CF could be optioned with Holden six-cylinder units, in 2,850 cc (173.9 cu in) and 3,310 cc (202.0 cu in) forms. This was as an answer to the rival Ford Transit range, which in Australia used six-cylinder engines from the Ford Falcon.

The Bedford used the same basic suspension lay-out as the Vauxhall Victor, though married to greater wheel arch clearances and calibrated for greater weight carrying capacity. The front independent suspension featured a double wishbone layout with coil springs and telescopic shock absorbers, while the rear wheels were suspended by a combination involving a live axle and traditional long single-leaf springs.

Several different manual transmissions were used: the Vauxhall three-speed, four-speed, Bedford four-speed, ZF four-speed, ZF five-speed, and the General Motors automatic. The Laycock type of overdrive was available to order or on the later Vauxhall four-speed models.

There were three CF1 body styles. A standard panel van which was intended to rival the Ford Transit; the special van body (essentially a self-contained cab with a general-purpose chassis onto which a wide range of custom-built bodies or beds could be built), and the Dormobile (caravanette).

== CF1 ==
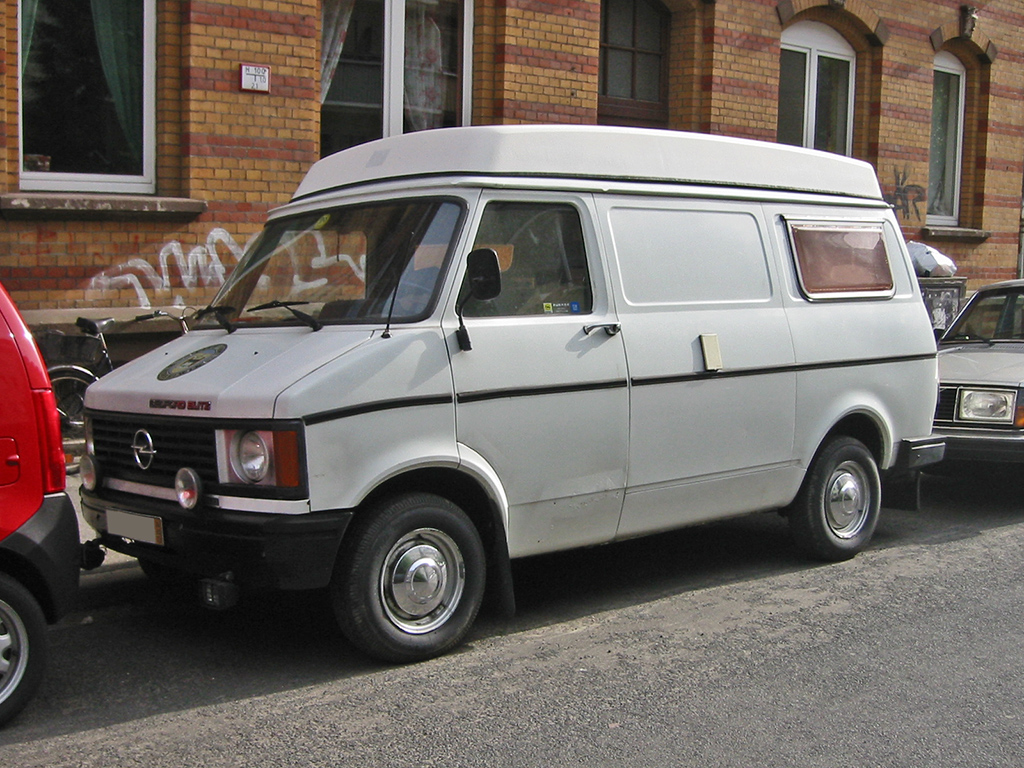
(late) German market Bedford Blitz, note Opel logo

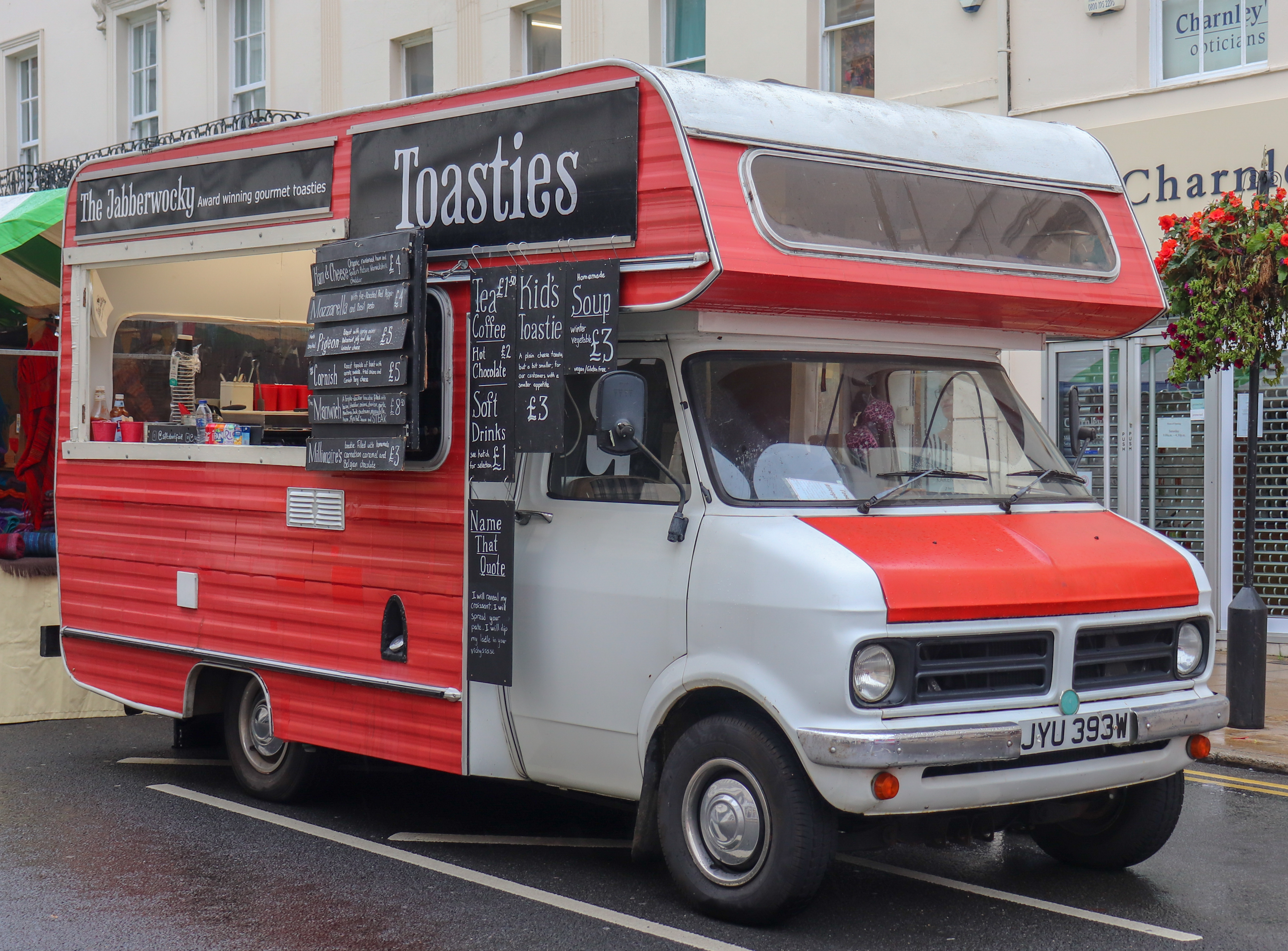
Bedford vans were very popular as ice cream vans and food trucks, with some of them still being used

The CF series 1 facelift was introduced in 1980, introducing the 2.3 L (2,260 cc) Opel 23D diesel engine with 61 hp (45.5 kW).

Units exported to Germany (Bedford Blitz) received a smaller, 2.0 L (1,998 cc) diesel, producing 60 PS (44 kW; 59 hp). This engine was also installed in many other export markets where tax categories suited engines with less than two litres of displacement, such as the Benelux countries and Finland. The 1.8 and 2.3 litre petrol units remained the same.

The restyled front end was engineered so that by removing 8 bolts the whole front panel could be completely removed, providing easy access to the engine so it could be removed from the front instead of from underneath like on the CF1.

The CF1 "facelift" is often confused with being a CF2 because it's difficult to tell them apart from the exterior. The easiest visual check is that the CF facelift will have the same old metallic door handles and mirrors as the CF1 while on the CF2 have new plastic ones.

== CF2 ==
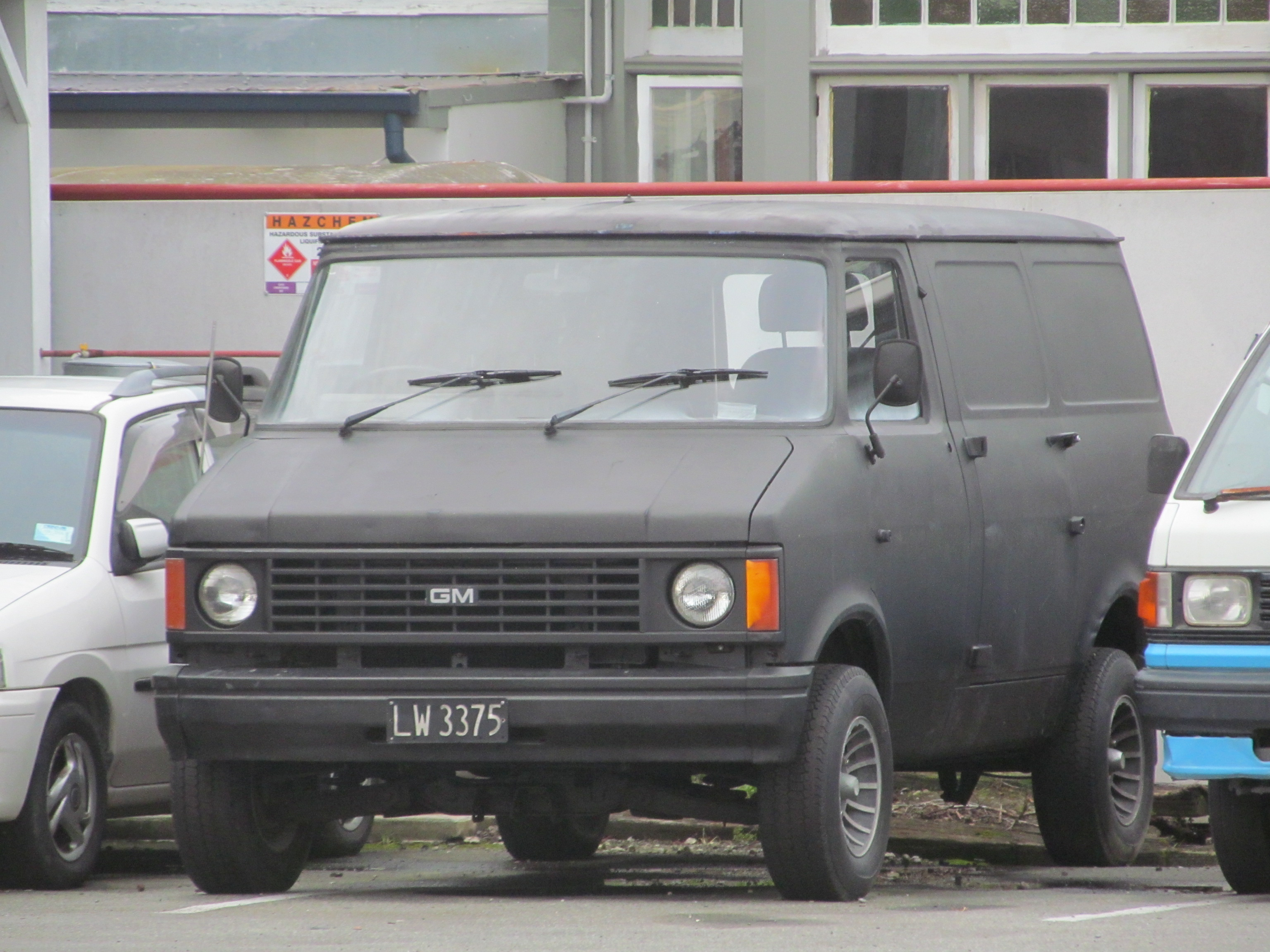
1984 CF series 2

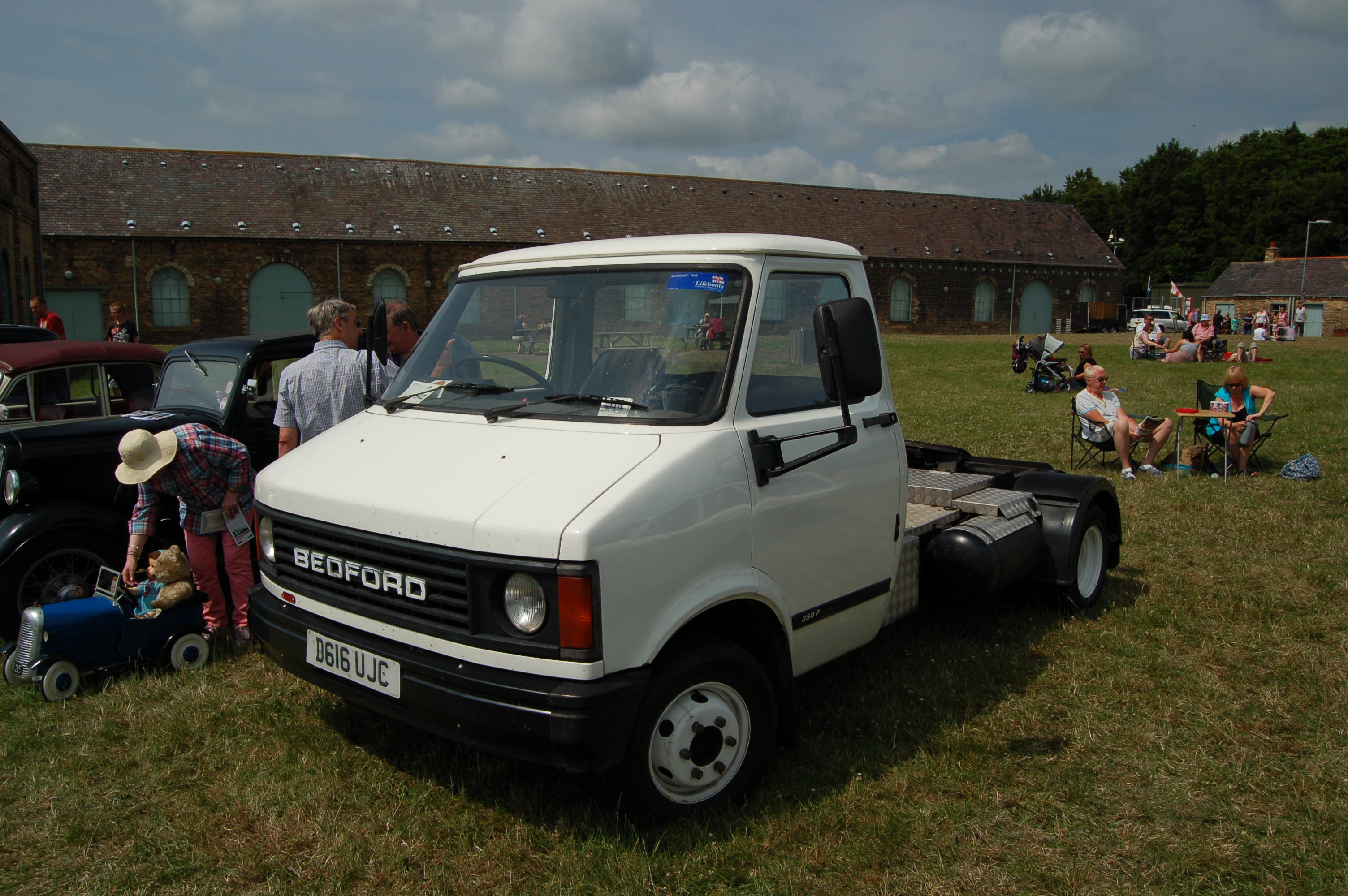
The Bedford CF was produced in many versions, including semi-trucks (as seen here) and pickup trucks

In 1984 the CF was renamed CF2 and basically only received mechanical upgrades. The diesel engines remained the 2.3 (with the 2.0 available in continental Europe) but the old Vauxhall slant fours were replaced by a 2.0 L (1,979 cc), 78 hp (58 kW) version of the Opel CIH four cylinder.

New transmissions were also available:

- 4-speed GM all-synchromesh gearbox on short-wheelbase models;
- ZF 5-speed overdrive all-synchromesh gearbox standard on all long-wheelbase models and optional on others;
- GM automatic transmission optional on most models;
- Choice of axle ratios on nearly all models.

And new efficient brakes:

- Front disc brakes with self-adjusting rear drums on CF2/230 to CF2/280;
- Self-adjusting drums all around on CF2/350 models;
- Load-sensing valve standard on all models.

In 1985 the CF2 was sold side by side in UK with the Bedford Midi - a smaller, badge engineered version of the Isuzu Fargo which was locally built at the newly established IBC Vehicles venture with Isuzu.

By then the CF's replacement was put on hold and then ultimately dropped when Bedford decided that rebadging other GM owned brands was much cheaper. The last CF2s were sold in the UK in 1987 and marked the end of original Bedford designed vehicles.

== CF Electric ==
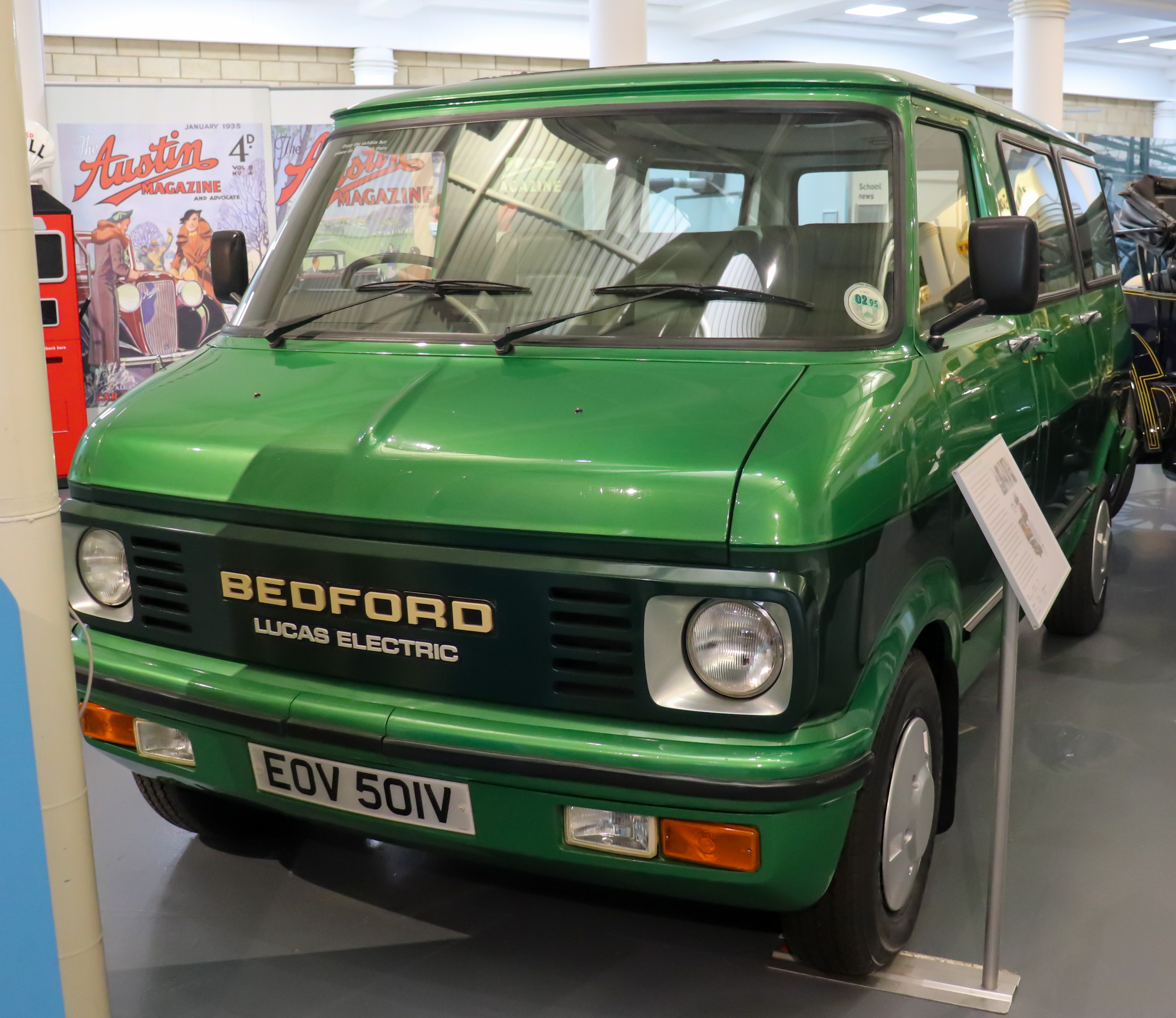
Bedford CF Electric with Lucas Electric badging at the British Motor Museum (2021)

One noteworthy variant, the CF Electric was introduced in 1982. More than 100 prototypes were built and tested at Millbrook Proving Ground between 1977 and 1983. It was the first electrically powered vehicle planned for mass production based on a fossil fuel vehicle platform, built in partnership between Bedford, Lucas, Chloride Group and the UK government on a 5-year grant scheme. Most were sold to government agencies, the Royal Mail, and local authorities for trials, which collectively were driven for more than 7,000,000 mi (11,000,000 km). However, with a price tag much higher than a standard CF, and battery technology at the time not advancing quickly, Bedford cancelled the program in July 1986 after 300 to 475 vehicles had been built. The government scheme wound down in 1987; the model was withdrawn and spares for it soon dried up.

One of the prototypes was acquired and tested by Southern California Edison in 1980. The lead-acid traction batteries were housed in a compartment below the floor and the DC traction motor was placed at the rear, coupled to a step down reduction gearbox attached to the CF's standard differential, but turned through 180°. There were 36 battery cells of 6 V each, wired in series for a total voltage of 216 V and storage capacity of 180 A-hr (38.9 kW-hr), with a total weight of 1,000 kg (2,205 lb); these required rewatering every two weeks, a procedure which took approximately three hours to complete. The DC traction motor had a rated output of 37 kW (50 hp), with a weight of 142 kg (312 lb) and was made by Lucas, model MT286. The motor control system was housed under the bonnet and a small diesel heater provided cabin heating. The system also featured regenerative braking, however this could be turned off as it was found that in wet conditions the motor could lock the rear wheels up in a similar way as applying the handbrake. As tested in 1980, the prototype had a range which varied from 15 mi (24 km), fully loaded on steep hills, to 74 mi (119 km), on freeway routes with no payload, and a top speed of 54 mph (87 km/h) unladen.

A heavily modified version of the CF Electric also was exported in left-hand drive form into the United States where it was rebadged and sold as the GMC Griffon. It had a payload of around 1,000 kg (2,200 lb) and a GVWR of 3,401 kg (7,498 lb), comparable to the prototype British van, which had a measured payload of 1,000 kg (2,205 lb) and GVWR of 3,500 kg (7,716 lb), giving it an estimated curb weight of approximately 2,500 kg (5,511 lb); this was done so the Griffon could be slotted with the full-size Chevrolet Van and GMC Vandura lines, although it was slightly shorter in length compared to its American counterparts. As tested in 1988, the Griffon weighed 3,073 kg (6,775 lb), with 1,100 kg (2,500 lb) of that being the weight of the battery pack. More than 30 of these vans were exported for trials with electric utility clients, in partnership with the Electric Power Research Institute (EPRI), but ultimately, as with the British variant, these never were sold widely in the American market. Under testing conducted by the Tennessee Valley Authority and published in 1988, the Griffon achieved a top speed of 53 mph (85 km/h) with an urban driving range of 54 mi (87 km), giving it an estimated usable storage capacity of 32.5 kW-hr and an observed consumption of 1.66 mi/kW-hr or 60.2 kW⋅h/100 mi (56.0 mpg‑e).

The Griffon was notable for being the first electric van sold by GM in the US, a market segment they would not re-enter until VIA Motors started converting Chevrolet Express vans into extended-range electric vehicles around 2014, which were marketed as the VTRUX Van. EPRI's work with the Griffon would lead to the G-Van of 1990, a variant of the conventional Chevrolet/GMC full-size vans retrofitted with the Griffon's powertrain, and later the Chrysler TEVan, which featured a longer range using nickel-iron battery chemistry.

The Griffon also was used to test the viability of a prototype 36 V lithium/iron sulfide molten-salt battery invented by Argonne National Laboratory; in a simulated test, the van was able to travel 200 mi (320 km) with a 900 lb (410 kg) load before requiring recharging, giving it an energy density three times greater than a conventional lead-acid traction battery of equivalent weight.

== Commercial ==
The Bedford CF van was the second most popular van in the UK, second only to the Ford Transit. Along with the Transit, the CF was usefully wider than competitor vehicles from Austin-Morris, Rootes and Volkswagen. It was also the most common caravanette. CFs were popular with customisers throughout the 1970s and 1980s.

== Users ==
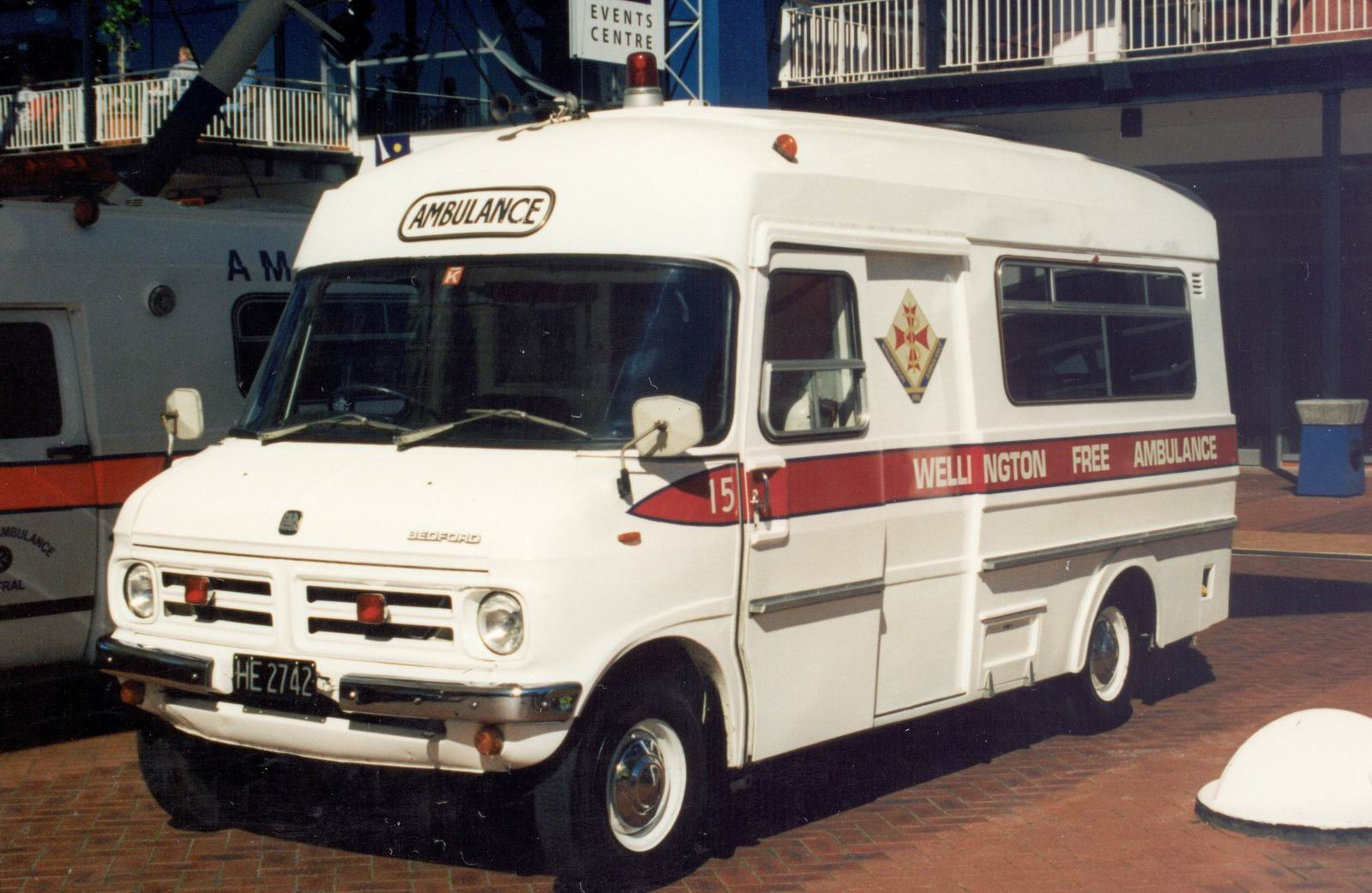
Wellington Free Ambulance Bedford CF

The Bedford CF was widely used. British police forces, in particular, used them for prisoner transport and as riot vans. They were also used by the Garda Síochána (Republic of Ireland police). Some ambulance services kept them in service for longer than usual after production ended as they were liked by crews. The British Military also had a fleet of CFs. They were used by builders and builders' merchants, as well as by courier services and the Post Office. They were also a popular caravanette due to their space and reasonable fuel consumption. They were used as ice cream vans in Britain and Australia.

A heavily modified CF was used as the Mystery Machine in Scooby-Doo: The Movie 2002.

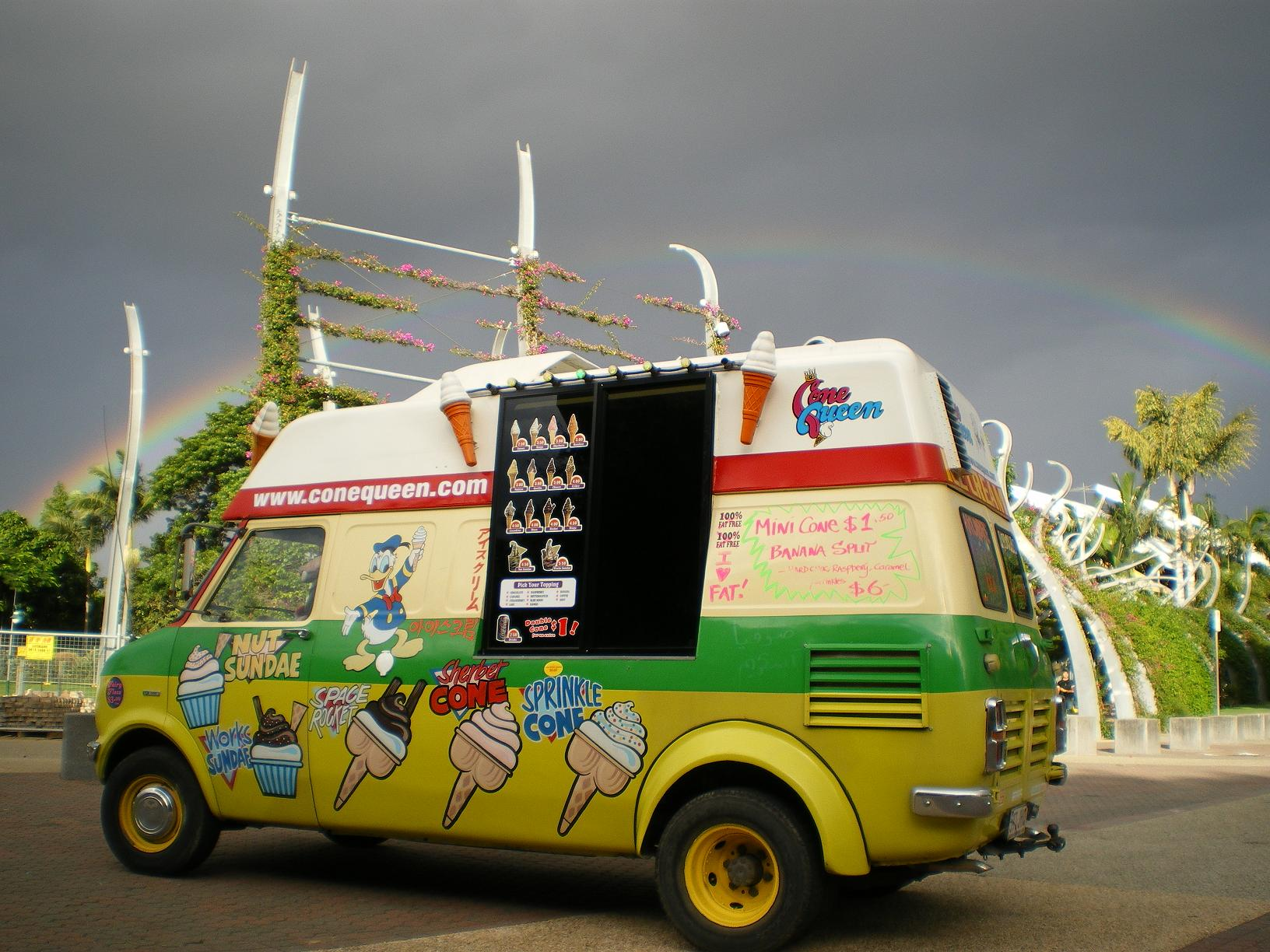
A Bedford CF in use as an ice cream van in Brisbane, Australia

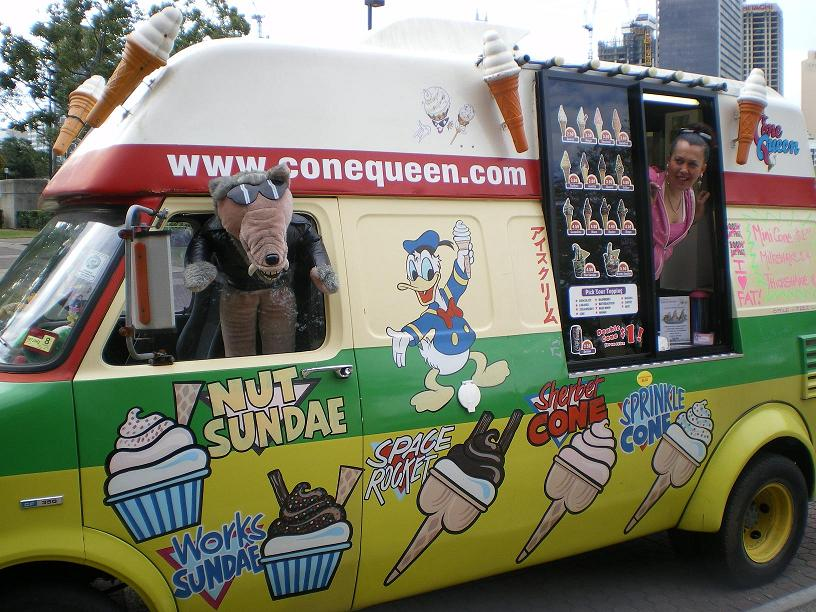

== Discontinuation ==
Initially, Bedford wanted to enter a joint venture with Leyland Motors to produce a replacement for the Bedford CF but these plans never caught on, since the British government did not want one of their major truck manufacturers to be controlled by a foreign company. Following economic problems and declining sales by Bedford, it was decided to divest the once legendary company with the Luton plant being re-organized as a joint venture with Isuzu and renamed to IBC Vehicles while the Dunstable plant was sold to AWD Trucks. In 1986, the Isuzu Fargo started getting produced by IBC as the Bedford Midi with local modifications for the European market. GM Europe would not return in the large panel van market until 1997 and 1998 when production of the Renault-based Opel/Vauxhall Arena and Movano started, both of which serve as the true successors to the CF range. Vauxhall continued to supply the CF's taillights to Bristol Cars for use in the Bristol Britannia until 2000.

== Technical specifications ==
1969

1969 range
Model type	Model designation	Engine	Wheelbase (inch/metre)	GVW
18 cwt.	97100	1,599 cc petrol	106 in (2,700 mm)	4,793 lb (2.174 t)
18 cwt.	97200	1,770 cc diesel	106 in (2,700 mm)	4,793 lb (2.174 t)
22 cwt.	97300	1,975 cc petrol	106 in (2,700 mm)	5,331 lb (2.418 t)
22 cwt.	97400	1,770 cc diesel	106 in (2,700 mm)	5,331 lb (2.418 t)
25 cwt.	97500	1,975 cc petrol	126 in (3,200 mm)	6,003 lb (2.723 t)
25 cwt.	97600	2,524 cc diesel	126 in (3,200 mm)	6,003 lb (2.723 t)
35 cwt.	97700	1,975 cc petrol	126 in (3,200 mm)	7,236 lb (3.282 t)
35 cwt.	97800	2,524 cc diesel	126 in (3,200 mm)	7,236 lb (3.282 t)

- 4390 lb. GVW available for models 97100, 97200 as Code 533.
- Vauxhall OHC 97.5 cu. in. (1598 cc) and 120.5 cu. in. (1975 cc) petrol engines available as high or low compression.
- Perkins 108 cu. in. (1770 cc) and 154 cu. in. (2523 cc) diesel engines.
- All models available as a van (/70), chassis cab (/60) or chassis cowl (/90).
- E.g.: 97170 18 cwt. van; 97760 35 cwt. chassis cab, 97590 25 cwt. chassis cowl.

1972

107.4 cu. in. (1759 cc) and 139 cu. in. (2279 cc) Vauxhall low compression OHC engines introduced from chassis number 2V610007.

1973

- 18 cwt. models (97100, 97200) replaced by 14/18 cwt. models.
- petrol engines: only 107.4 cu. in. (1759 cc) and 139 cu. in. (2279 cc) low compression available.
- (Unclear when OHC 97.5 cu. in. (1598 cc) and 120.5 cu. in. (1975 cc) petrol engines discontinued.)

1978

From chassis number HY600001

1978 range
Model type	Model designation	Engine	Wheelbase	GVW (kg/ton)	Axle ratio
18 cwt.	97100	1759 cc (107.5 cu. in.) petrol	2692 mm (106 in)	2235/2.2	8/37
18 cwt.	97F00	2064 cc (126 cu. in.) diesel	2692 mm (106 in)	2235/2.2	8/37
22 cwt.	97300	2279 cc (139 cu. in.) petrol	2692 mm (106 in)	2500/2.46	8/37
22 cwt.	97G00	2064 cc (126 cu. in.) diesel	2692 mm (106 in)	2500/2.46	8/37
25 cwt.	97500	2279 cc (139 cu. in.) petrol	3200 mm (126 in)	2828/2.78	11/49
25 cwt.	97H00	2064 cc (126 cu. in.) diesel	3200 mm (126 in)	2828/2.78	9/47
35 cwt.	97700	2279 cc (139 cu. in.) petrol	3200 mm (126 in)	3375/3.32	9/47
35 cwt.	97800	2064 cc (126 cu. in.) diesel	3200 mm (126 in)	3375/3.32	9/47

- GM diesel engines introduced; Perkins diesel engines discontinued.
- 97F00 SVOS (Special Version Option Scheme) 8294: 1900 cc diesel engine in place of 2064 cc diesel engine.
- Electric van: Designation 97300 Code 123 (unclear when introduced).

1979

1979 range
Model type	Model designation	Engine	Wheelbase (mm/inch)	GVW	Axle ratio
CF220	97100	1759 cc (107.5 cu. in.) petrol	2692 mm (106 in)	2,235 kg (2.20 long tons)	8/37
CF220	97F00	1998 cc (121.9 cu. in.) diesel	2692 mm (106 in)	2,235 kg (2.20 long tons)	8/37
CF250	97300	2279 cc (139 cu. in.) petrol	2692 mm (106 in)	2,500 kg (2.46 long tons)	8/37
CF250	97G00	1998 cc (121.9 cu. in.) diesel	2692 mm (106 in)	2,500 kg (2.46 long tons)	8/37
CF280	97500	2279 cc (139 cu. in.) petrol	3200mm (126 in)	2,828 kg (2.78 long tons)	11/49
CF280	97H00	1998 cc (121.9 cu. in.) diesel	3200mm (126 in)	2,828 kg (2.78 long tons)	9/47
CF340	97700	2279 cc (139 cu. in.) petrol	3200mm (126 in)	3,375 kg (3.32 long tons)	9/47
CF340	97K00	1998 cc (121.9 cu. in.) diesel	3200mm (126 in)	3,375 kg (3.32 long tons)	9/47
CF350	97700	2279 cc (139 cu. in.) petrol	3200mm (126 in)	3,375 kg (3.32 long tons)	9/47
CF350	97K00	1998 cc (121.9 cu. in.) diesel	3200mm (126 in)	3,375 kg (3.32 long tons)	9/47

- CF350 only available as chassis cab (/60) or chassis cowl (/90)
- 2064 cc (126 cu. in.) GM diesel engine discontinued.
- 2260 cc (137.9 cu. in.) GM diesel engine introduced from chassis number LY600101.

1982

Facelift models introduced (preceded by Facelift dash and wiring introduced 1981)

1984

CF2 models introduced.

1984 range
Model type	Model designation	Engine	Wheelbase	GVW	Axle ratio
CF220	97100	1979 cc (120.8 cu. in.) petrol	2692mm (106 in)	2235 kg (2.2 LT)	9/37
CF220	97F00	2260 cc (137.9 cu. in.) diesel	2692mm (106 in)	2235 kg (2.2 LT)	9/37
CF250	97300	1979 cc (120.8 cu. in.) petrol	2692mm (106 in)	2500 (2.46 LT)	9/37
CF250	97G00	2260 cc (137.9 cu. in.) diesel	2692mm (106 in)	2500 (2.46 LT)	9/37
CF280	97500	1979 cc (120.8 cu. in.) petrol	3200 mm (126 in)	2820 kg (2.78 LT)	11/49
CF280	97H00	2260 cc (137.9 cu. in.) diesel	3200 mm (126 in)	2820 kg (2.78 LT)	11/49
CF350	97700	1979 cc (120.8 cu. in.) petrol	3200 mm (126 in)	3375 kg (3.32 LT)	11/49
CF350	97K00	2260 cc (137.9 cu. in.) diesel	3200 mm (126 in)	3375 kg (3.32 LT)	9/47

Opel 1979 cc CIH petrol engine replaced Vauxhall 1759 cc and 2239 cc OHC petrol engine.
