= Industries Mécaniques Maghrébines =

Tunisian and Algerian manufacturer of Isuzu vehicles

- Type: S.A. (Tunisia); SARL (Algeria)
- Industry: Manufacturing, assembly and distribution of vehicles.
- Founded: 1982-1988; 1991-present
- Headquarters: Kairouan, Tunisia
- Area served: Maghreb
- Key people: Tahar Latrous (CEO); Jameleddine Latrous (GM)
- Products: Automobiles; Minivans; Pickups; SUVs
- Owner: General Motors; Isuzu
- Number of employees: 320 (Tunisia, 2009); 20 (Algeria, 2009)
- Parent: General Motors Locomotif du Tunisie
- Divisions: Industries Mécaniques Maghrébines SARL

The Industries Mécaniques Maghrébines S.A. (IMM) are a Tunisian car manufacturer headquartered in the city of Kairouan. The company was founded in 1982 by GM and other investors and closed for the first time in 1988; the plant was reopened in 1991. Since then, the manufacturer has formed subsidiaries to distribute its vehicles in Carthage, Tunis and Oued Smar, Algeria.

The company is owned by General Motors and Isuzu.

In January 2008, it was announced that the Algerian subsidiary will be converted for the assembly of vehicles, up to 25,000 units a year.

In Kairouan, IMM is manufacturing up to 4,000 units a year, marketed alongside the two local markets in Gibraltar, Morocco, Mauritania and Libya. The IMM is responsible for the supply of the markets of the Maghreb region and the Arab Maghreb Union.

IMM is the only Tunisian car manufacturer besides Wallyscar. However, in Algeria SOVAC (VW), Elsecom Motors (Ford) and the RPA (Renault) are serious competitors.

== Current models ==
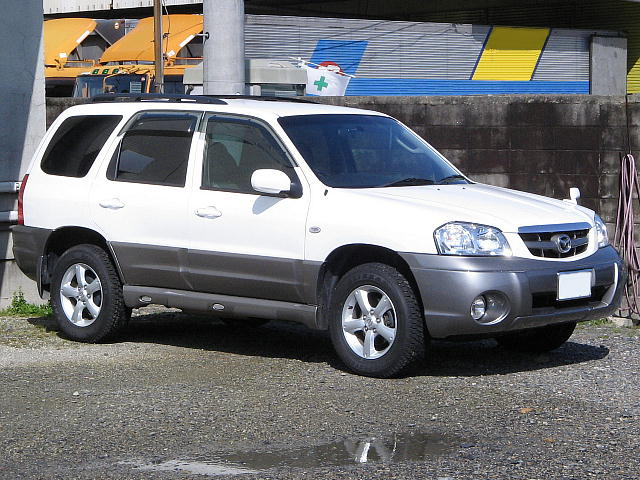
Mazda Tribute
2003–present
CKD assembly

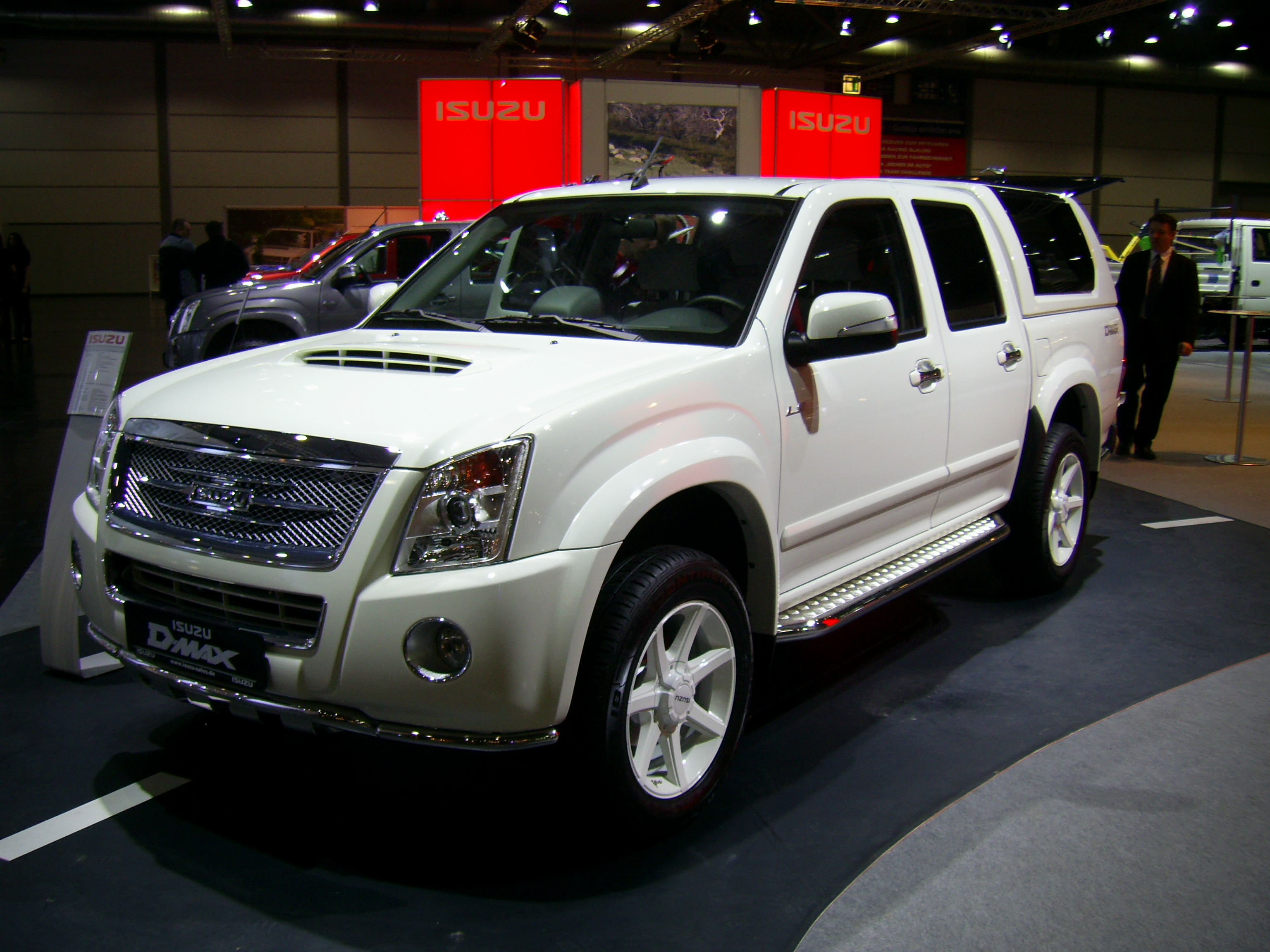
Isuzu D-Max
2009–present

== Former models ==
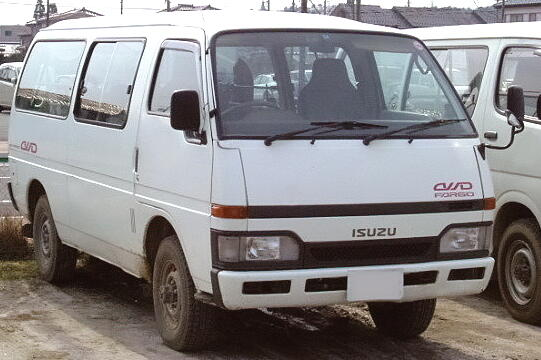
Isuzu Midi
1983-1988

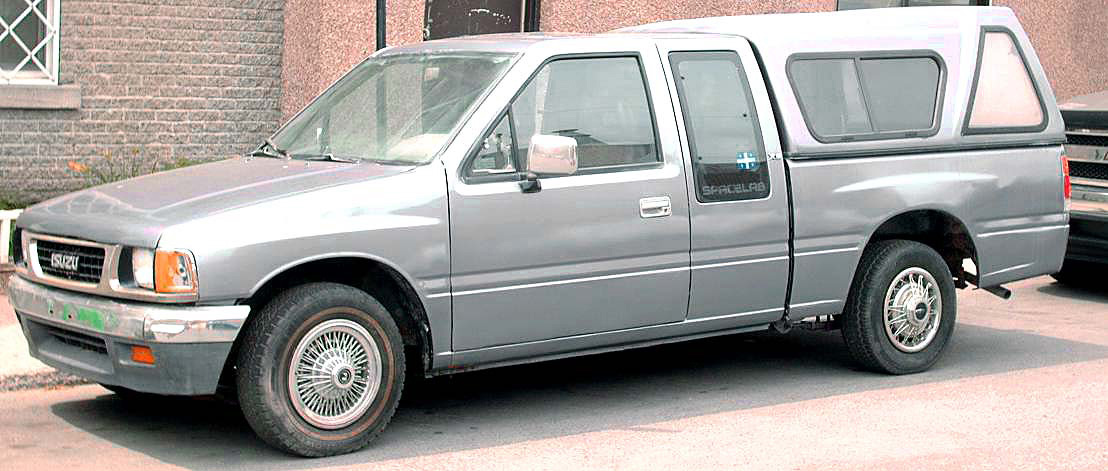
Isuzu Rodeo
1983-1988

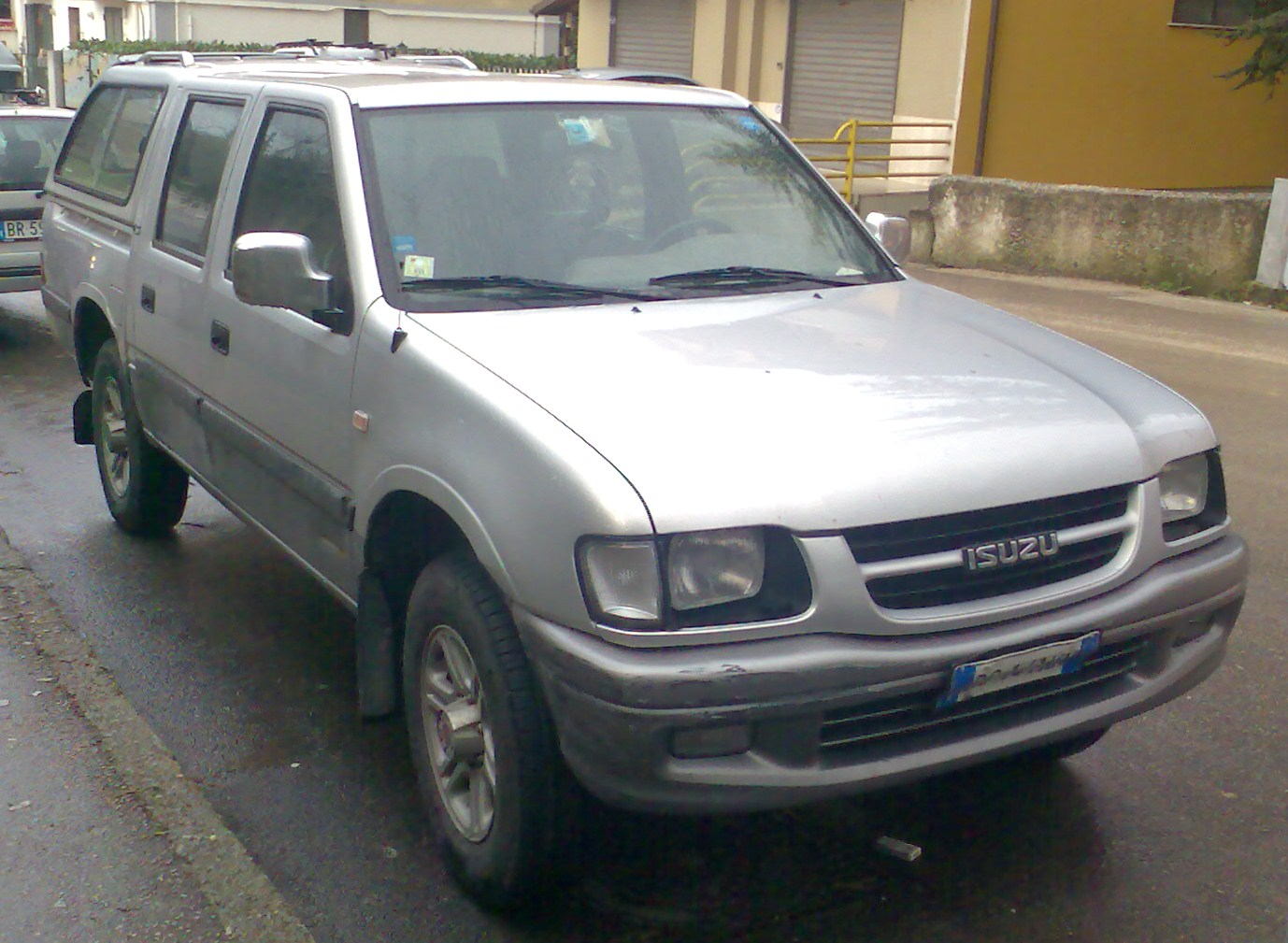
Isuzu Rodeo
1991-1995

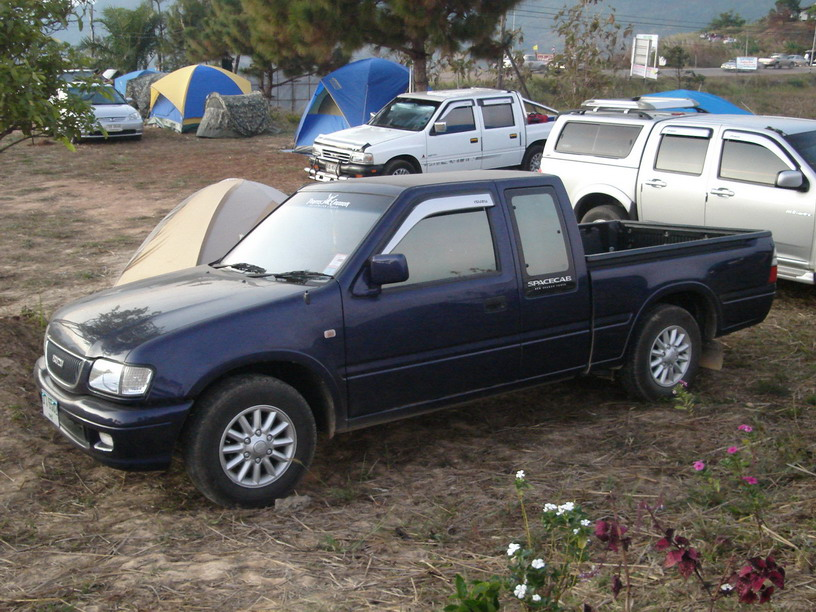
Isuzu Rodeo
1995-2002

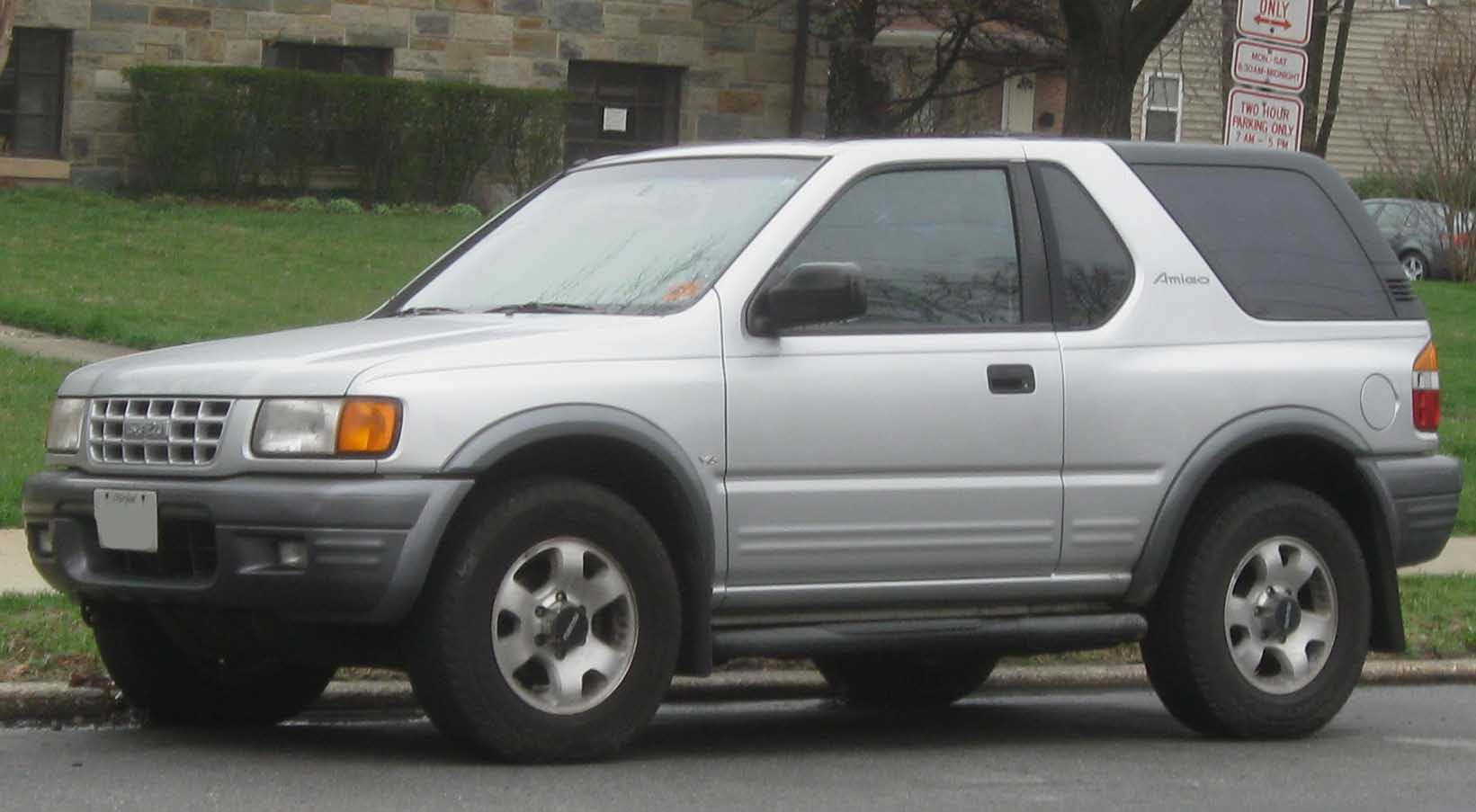
Isuzu Amigo
1999-2002
CKD assembly

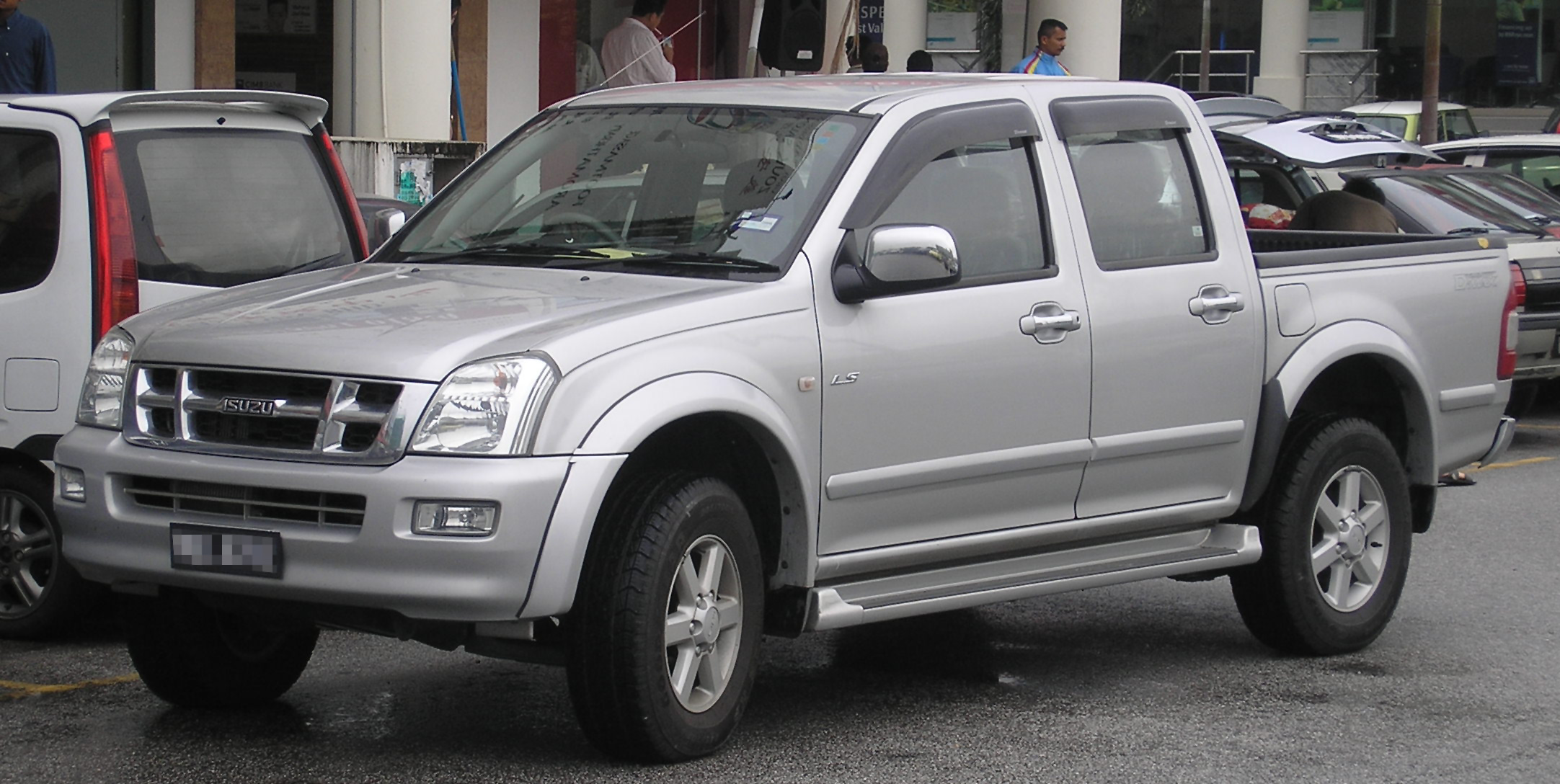
Isuzu D-Max
2002-2009
