= Fiat Professional =

Commercial vehicle arm of Fiat

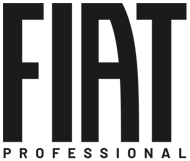
- Type: Subsidiary
- Industry: Automotive
- Predecessor: Fiat Veicoli Commerciali
- Founded: 17 April 2007; 19 years ago
- Headquarters: Turin, Italy
- Area served: APAC, EMEA
- Products: Light commercial vehicles
- Parent: Stellantis Europe
- Website: fiatprofessional.com

Fiat Professional is the brand name and subsidiary of Stellantis which manufactures light commercial vehicles and their passenger variants. It was launched on 17 April 2007 and replaced the Fiat Veicoli Commerciali division. Fiat Professional is present in the EMEA and Asia-Pacific regions; the Fiat Automobiles brand is used in the Latin America region. The Fiat Ducato and the Fiat Doblò are rebadged as the Ram ProMaster and Ram ProMaster City respectively for sale in Canada and the US.

== Current products ==
- Fiat Panda Van

The Fiat Panda Van is a panel van version of Fiat's city car.

- Fiat Fiorino

Fiat Doblò

The Fiat Doblò is a panel van and leisure activity vehicle produced in three generations since 2001, with the first two generations produced at Tofaş. It was first unveiled at the Paris Motor Show in 2000. Opel then launched a rebadged version, named the Combo. In North America, the second-generation facelift model was called the Ram ProMaster City, manufactured from 2015 to 2023. The third generation is based on the Citroën Berlingo.

- Fiat Scudo

The Fiat Scudo is an intermediate sized van produced at the joint venture Sevel Nord factory; now in its third generation, it was first introduced in 1994. It is a rebadged Citroën Jumpy.

- Fiat Ducato

The Fiat Ducato is a large van produced at the joint venture Sevel factories in Italy and Brazil, and since 2008 also under licence in Yelabuga (Russia) by Russian automobile company Sollers JSC (formerly Severstal Auto). Versions of the van are also sold by Citroën and Peugeot as the Jumper (Relay in the United Kingdom) and Boxer, respectively. Since 2013, the Ducato has been produced by Stellantis North America in Mexico as the Ram ProMaster. Following Groupe PSA's acquisition of the Opel and Vauxhall brands and its subsequent merger with FCA to form Stellantis, the Ducato is rebadged as the Movano under those two brands since 2021. Since 2023, the Ducato is also rebadged and sold by Toyota as the ProAce Max due to a partnership between Toyota and Stellantis Group.

- Fiat Strada

The Fiat Strada is a supermini coupé utility, based on Fiat's "world car" project, the Palio. It is produced in Betim, Minas Gerais, Brazil and exported to the European Union. In 2015, Ram Trucks launched a rebadged version exclusively for the Mexican market, named the Ram 700.

== Discontinued products ==
- Fiat Punto Van

The Fiat Punto Van is a panel van version of Fiat's supermini.

- Fiat Fullback

The Fiat Fullback was a medium-sized pickup, a rebadged version of the fifth generation Mitsubishi Triton. It was produced in Thailand from 2016 to 2019 through a joint venture of Fiat Chrysler Automobiles and Mitsubishi Motors and was exported to Europe and Middle East.

- Fiat Talento

The Fiat Talento was an intermediate sized van produced at the Sandouville Renault Factory and in Luton at IBC Vehicles Ltd; though it is known to be a rebadged Renault Trafic, it was produced from July 2016 to 2020. It replaces the old model of the Scudo. Now it has been replaced by the new generation of the Scudo, which is a rebadged Citroën Jumpy.

- Fiat Fiorino

The Fiat Fiorino is a panel van. Its MPV version is sold as Fiat Qubo, under the Fiat brand. The design and investment for this model were shared with PSA Peugeot Citroën whose brands Peugeot and Citroën sell their own version of this model.

- Other vehicles

Many other Fiat vehicles have been sold as LCVs by Fiat Professional without being proper panel vans, such as the Fiat Seicento/600 Van, the Fiat Multipla Van, the Fiat Bravo Van or the Fiat 500L Pro.

== Gallery ==
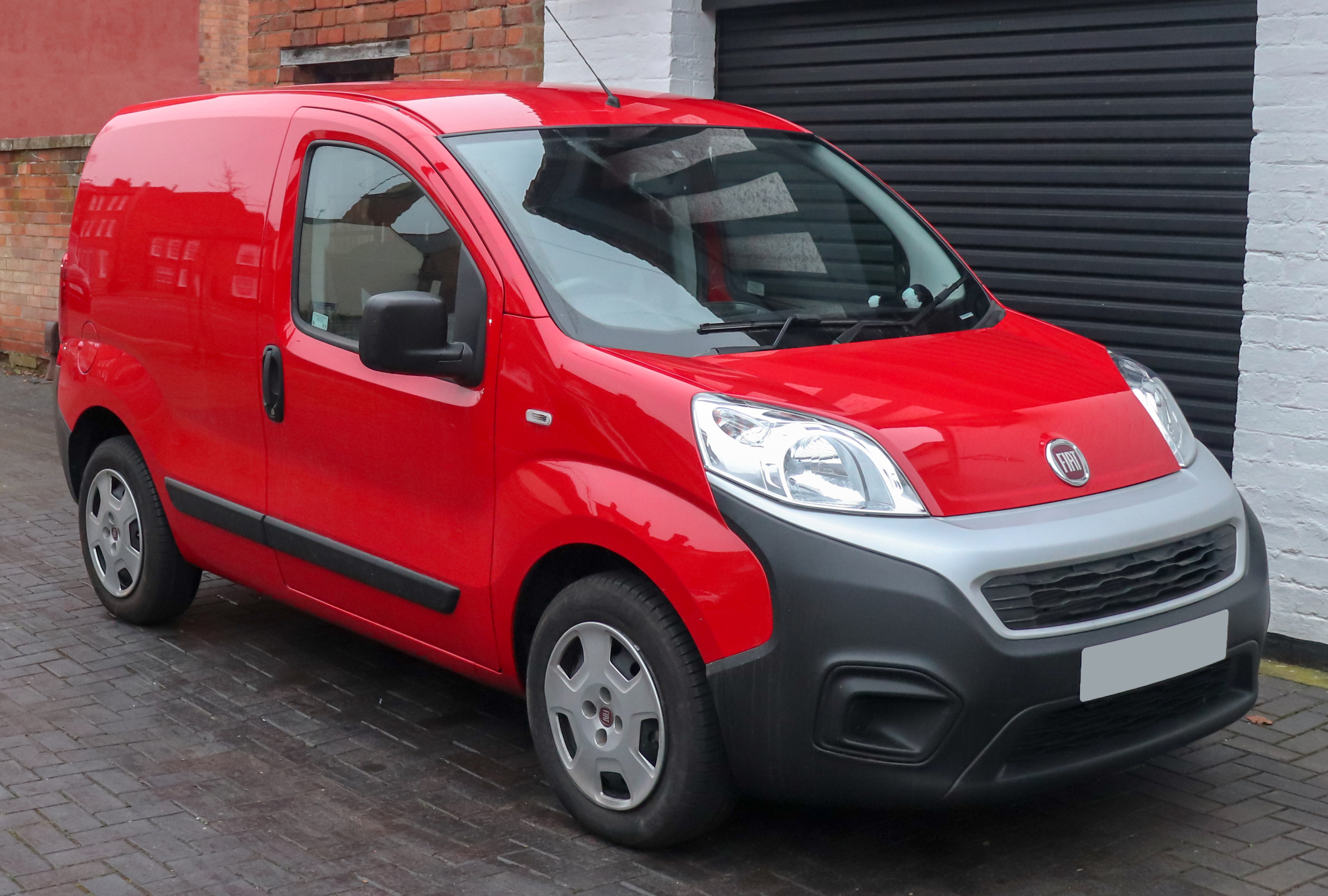
Fiorino

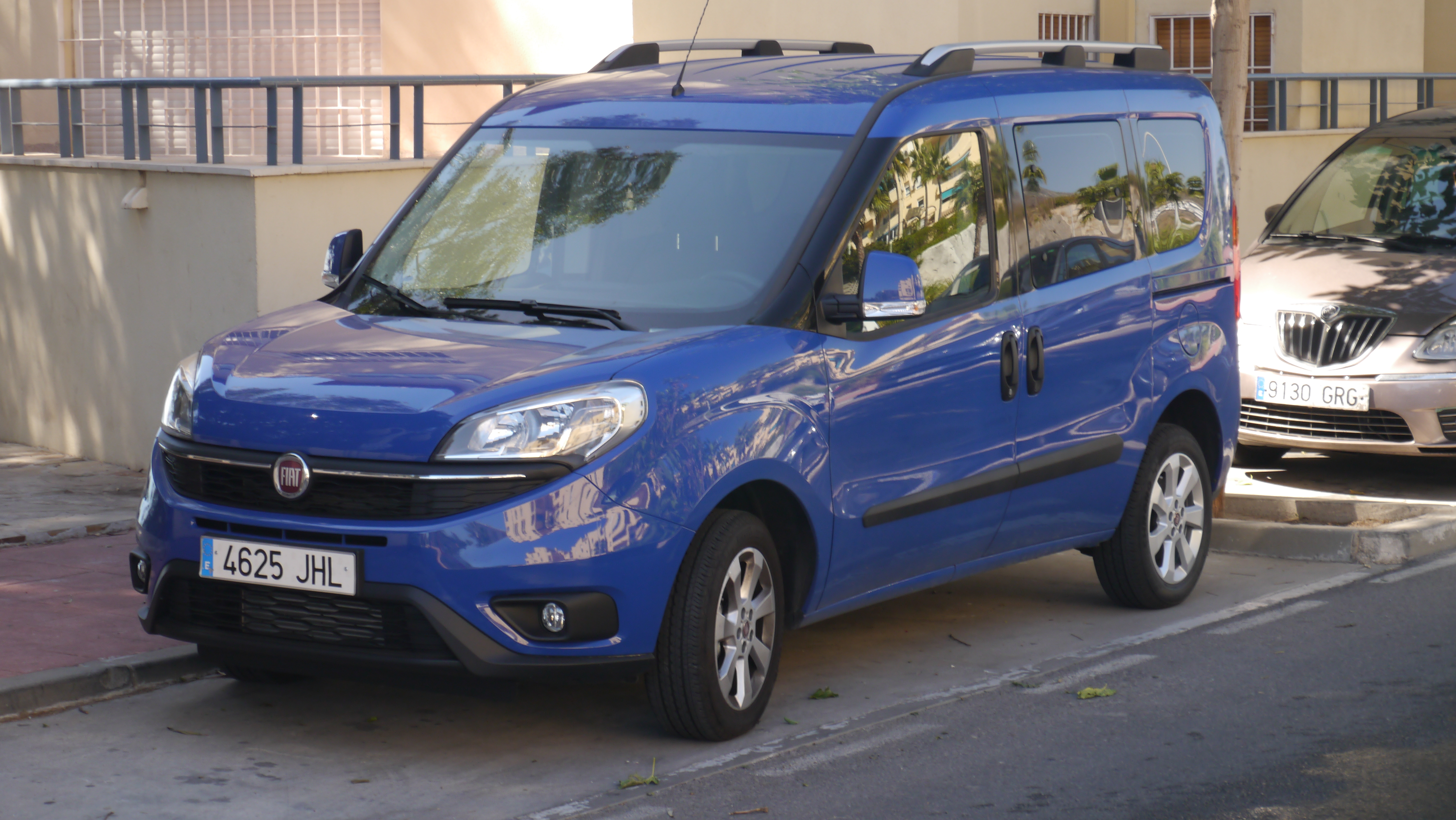
Doblò

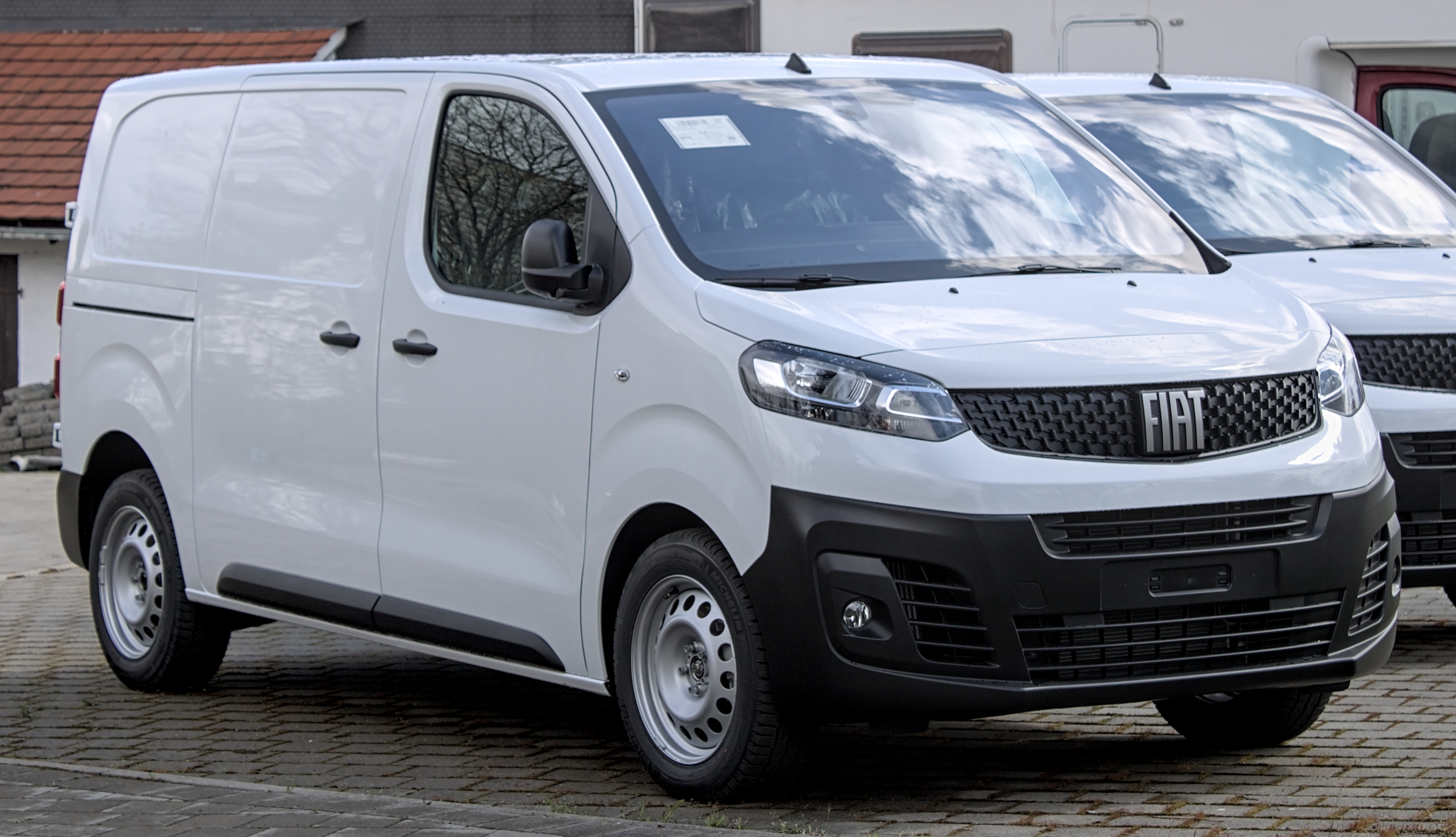
Scudo

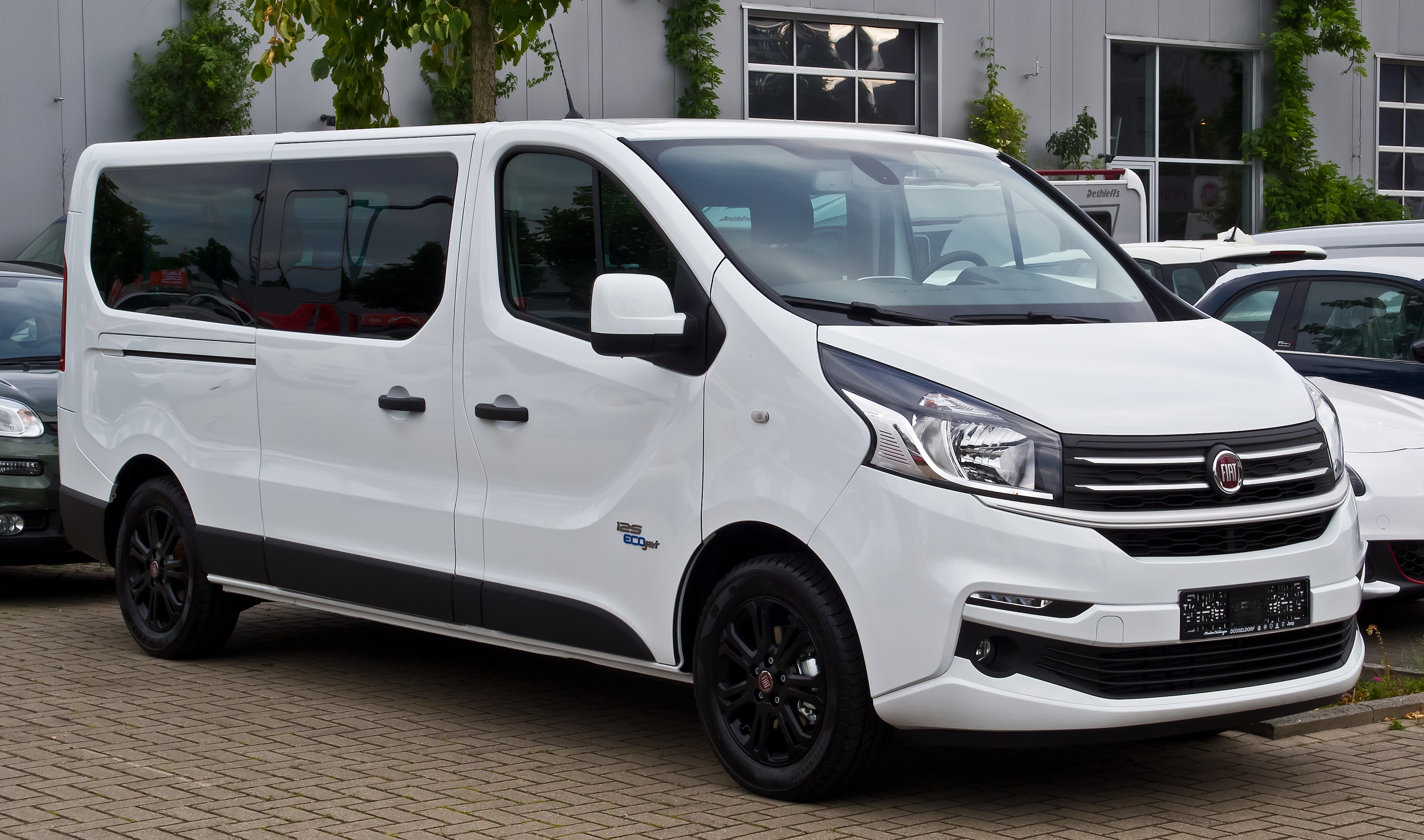
Talento

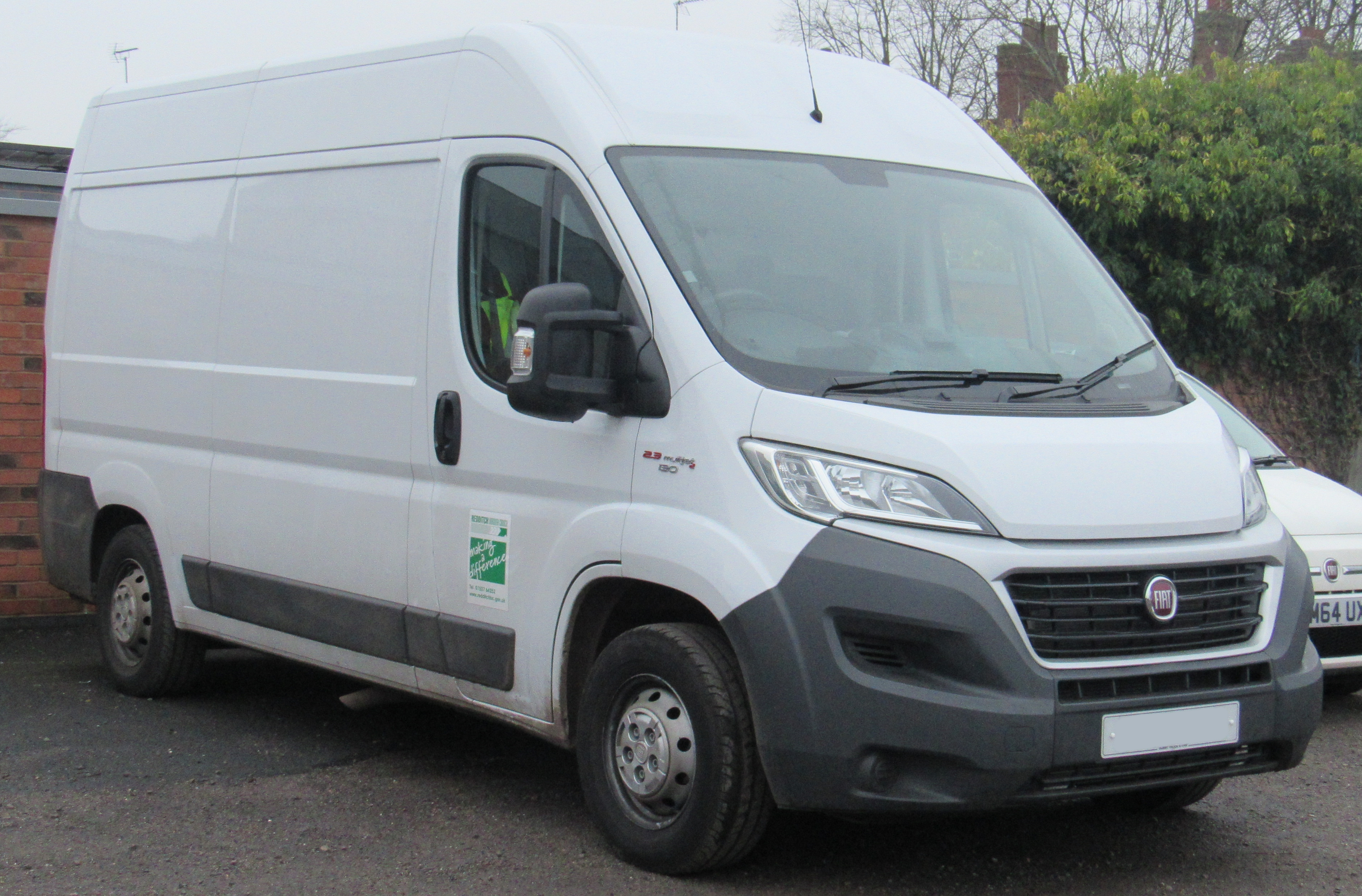
Ducato

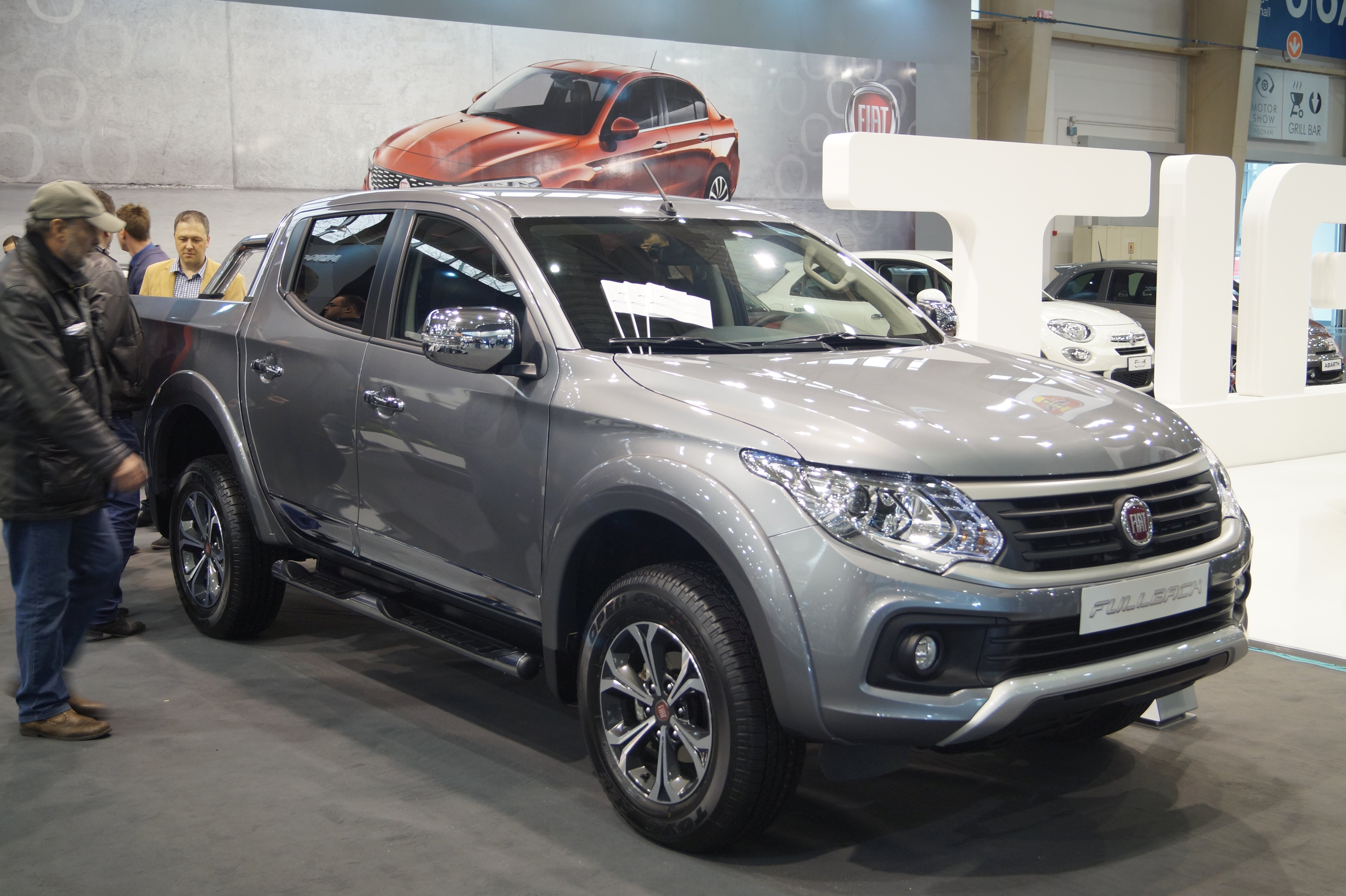
Fullback

== See also ==
- Ram Trucks, Stellantis's light to medium duty commercial vehicle brand marketed primarily in North America.
