= Isuzu Fargo =

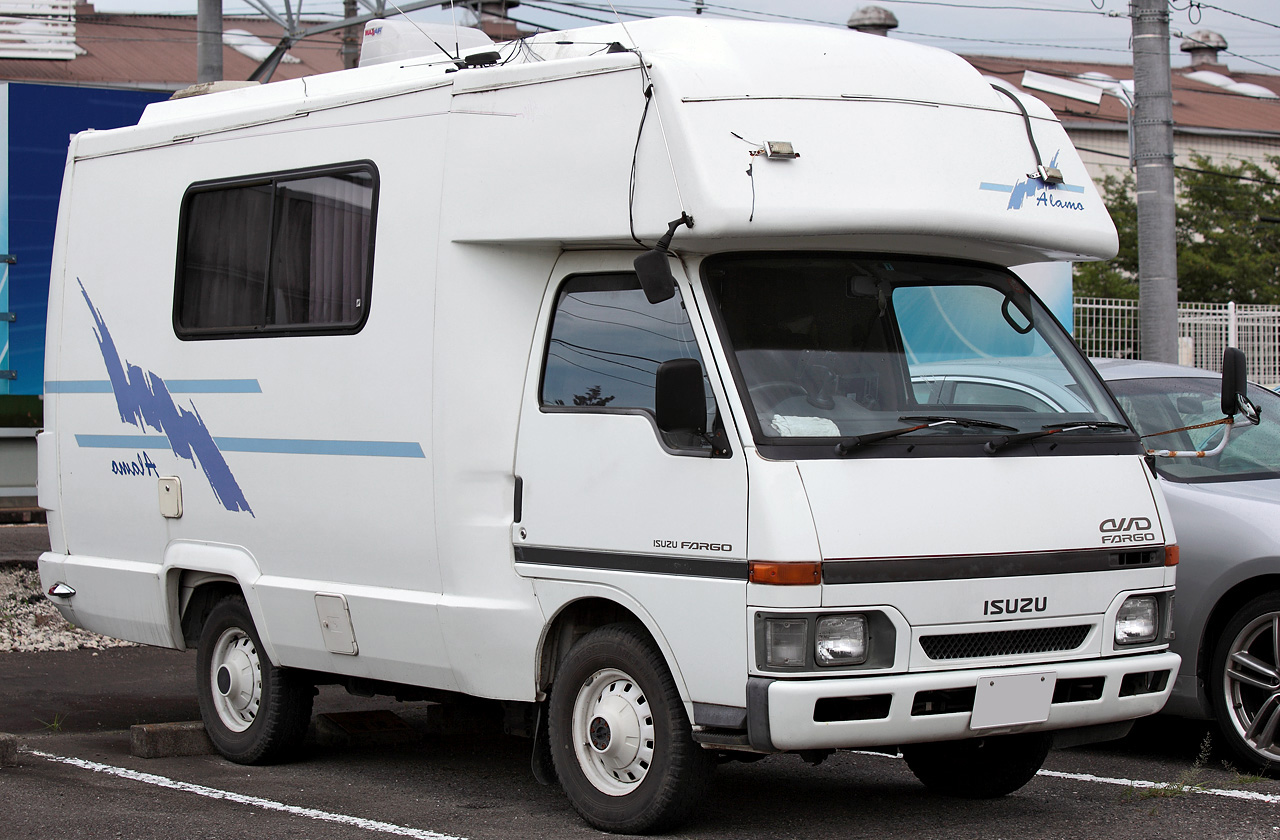

Overview
- Manufacturer: Isuzu
- Production: December 1980 – May 2001

Body and chassis
- Class: Light commercial vehicle
- Body style: 2-door cab forward pickup 3-door van

Chronology
- Predecessor: Bedford CF (Europe and Australia)
- Successor: Isuzu Como; Vauxhall Arena/Vauxhall Movano (Vauxhall and Bedford models); Isuzu Faster (pickup models)

The Isuzu Fargo is a light commercial van manufactured between 1980 and 2001 by Japanese automaker Isuzu in Japan. The Fargo spanned two generations, the first of which was sold between 1980 and 1995 as both van and pickup body styles, with the second generation, introduced in 1995, confined to a single van body style. This second generation was a badge-engineered version of the Nissan Caravan (E24), as opposed to an Isuzu design.

Between 1982 and 1990, the first-generation Fargo was marketed in Australia by Holden, the Australian subsidiary of General Motors as the Holden Shuttle. In Europe and New Zealand, the first series Isuzu Fargo was sold under the Isuzu WFR name. In Colombia, it was sold as the Chevrolet WFR. It was also built in the United Kingdom by Vauxhall Motors and sold as the Bedford Midi, then the Vauxhall Midi.

Export versions of the Midi in Europe were badged GME Midi (in Spain), Isuzu Midi, Bedford Midi and Bedford Seta (in Portugal).

== First generation (1980–1995) ==
First generation
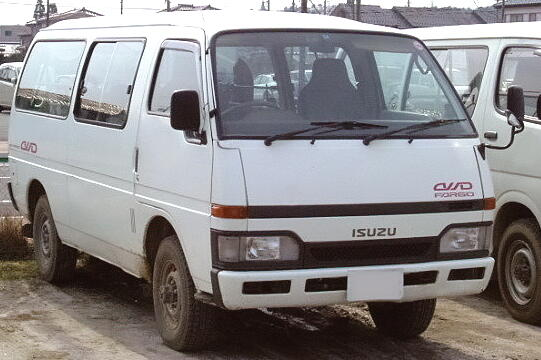

Overview
- Also called: Bedford Midi; Chevrolet WFR (Colombia); GME Midi (Spain); Holden Shuttle (Australia); Isuzu Midi; Isuzu WFR (Europe and NZ); Vauxhall Midi (United Kingdom); Bedford Seta (Portugal)
- Production: 1980–1995
- Assembly: Japan: Fujisawa, Kanagawa (Fujisawa Plant); Tunisia: Kairouan (IMM); United Kingdom: Luton (Luton plant)

Body and chassis
- Body style: 2-door cab forward pickup 3-door van
- Layout: Front-engine, rear-wheel drive Front-engine, four-wheel drive

Powertrain
- Transmission: 4-speed manual transmission 5-speed manual transmission 3-speed automatic transmission 4-speed automatic transmission

Dimensions
- Wheelbase: SWB: 2,350 mm (93 in); LWB: 2,690 mm (106 in)
- Length: SWB: 4,350 mm (171 in); LWB: 4,690 mm (185 in)
- Width: 1,690 mm (67 in)
- Height: Low roof: 1,950 mm (77 in); High roof: 2,185 mm (86.0 in)

Chronology
- Successor: Opel/Vauxhall Arena (European models)

The first-generation Isuzu Fargo was introduced in December 1980 with a 1.6- and 1.8-litre petrol engines, and a 1.8-litre diesel engine. A 2.0-litre diesel was also available, but originally only in the wagon version. The commercial (van) version gained this option beginning in August 1981. Designed very much in the mould of contemporary Japanese vehicles of the time, it featured an underfloor engine.

=== Japanese market timeline ===
The 1.8-litre options were dropped in March 1982, both replaced by 2.0-litre engines. In July 1982, the luxury-oriented 9-seater LS Wagon was introduced, featuring a standard sunroof among other features. At the same time, the column shifter was retired and a floor-mounted shifter became standard across the line. In November 1983, diesels became available with part-time four-wheel drive. In January 1984, turbodiesel engines were introduced in the Wagon LF model, followed by the addition of optional four-wheel drive on wagons in November of that year.

In January 1986, the Fargo received a facelift, with changes to the headlights (now somewhat wider and with a more trapezoidal shape) and the instrument panel. One year later, an automatic transmission became available on rear-wheel drive variants. In September 1987, the naturally aspirated diesel wagons were discontinued, leaving only turbodiesels for these noncommercial versions. In October 1988, a short-lived cab-forward pickup (truck) body style was added; it was soon replaced by the more popular Isuzu Faster trucks.

In January 1991, the 2.4-litre 4FG1 diesel engine introduced, replacing the earlier 1.8- and 2.0-litre units. Design changes were also made, to both the interior and exterior. In August 1993, the 2.4-litre 4FG1-T turbodiesel standardised across the range. Three-point rear seatbelts were now fitted to models fitted with rear seats and the air conditioning unit is now chlorofluorocarbon free (CFC).

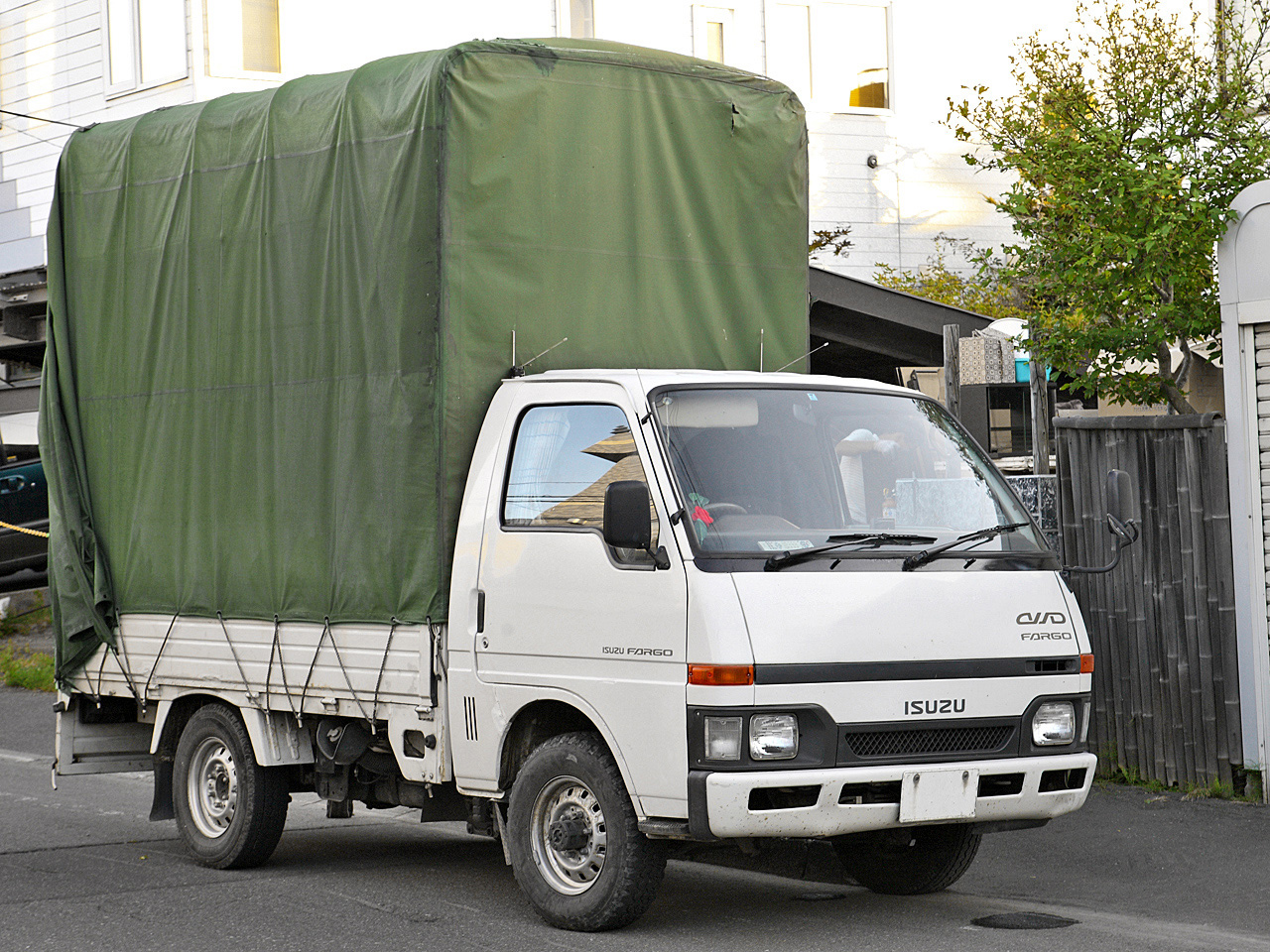
1991–1995 Isuzu Fargo truck

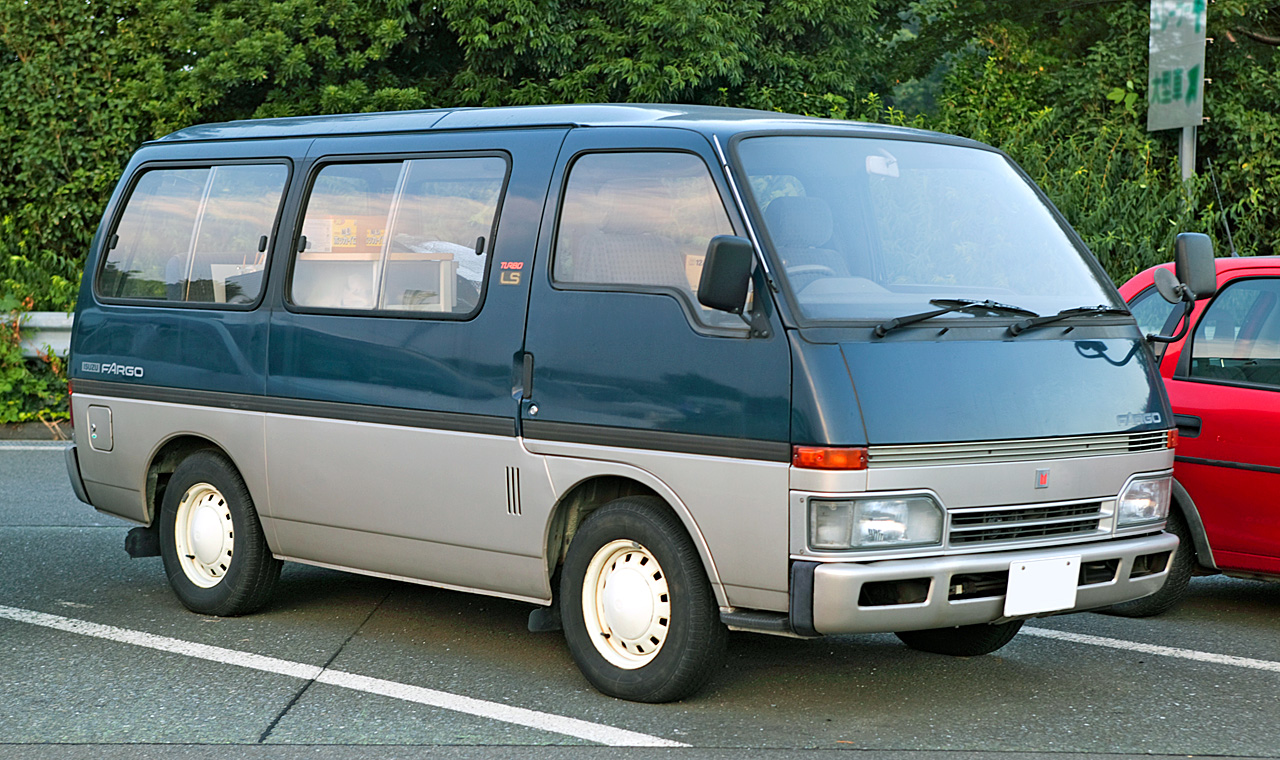
1993–1995 Isuzu Fargo LS van

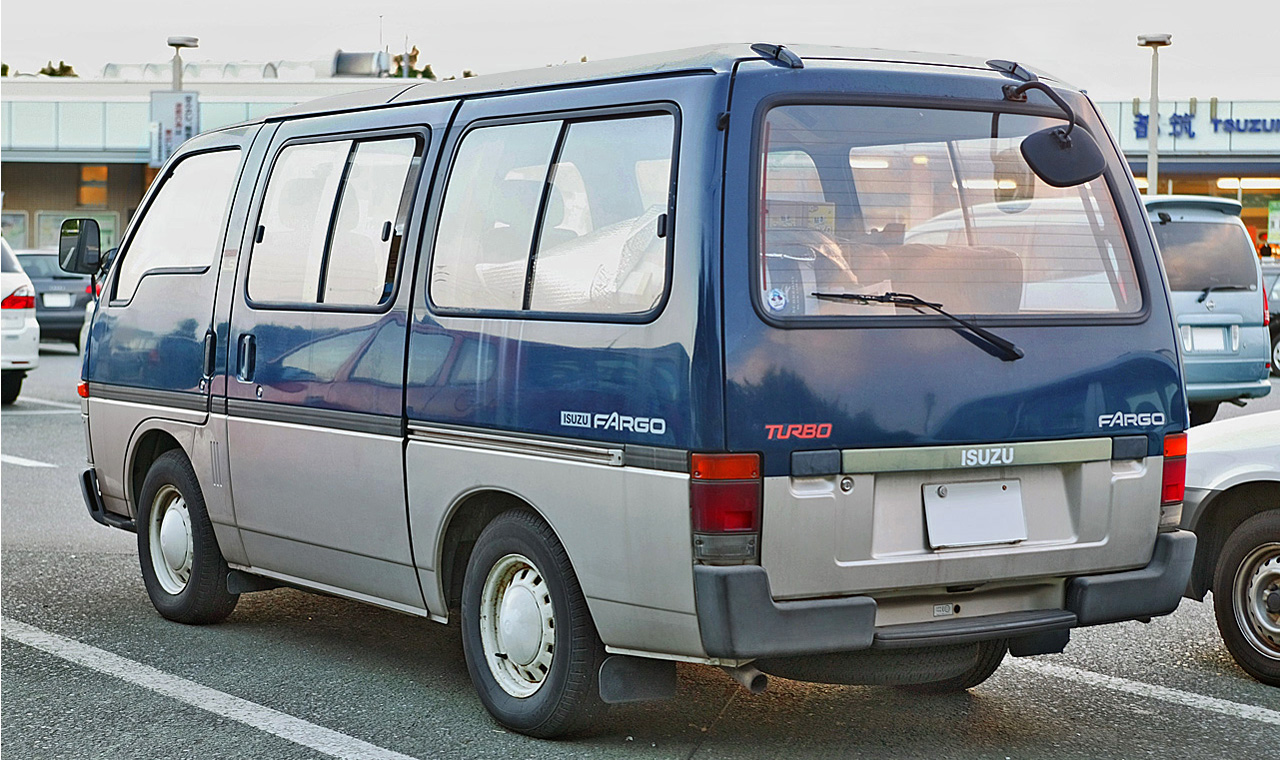
1993–1995 Isuzu Fargo LS van

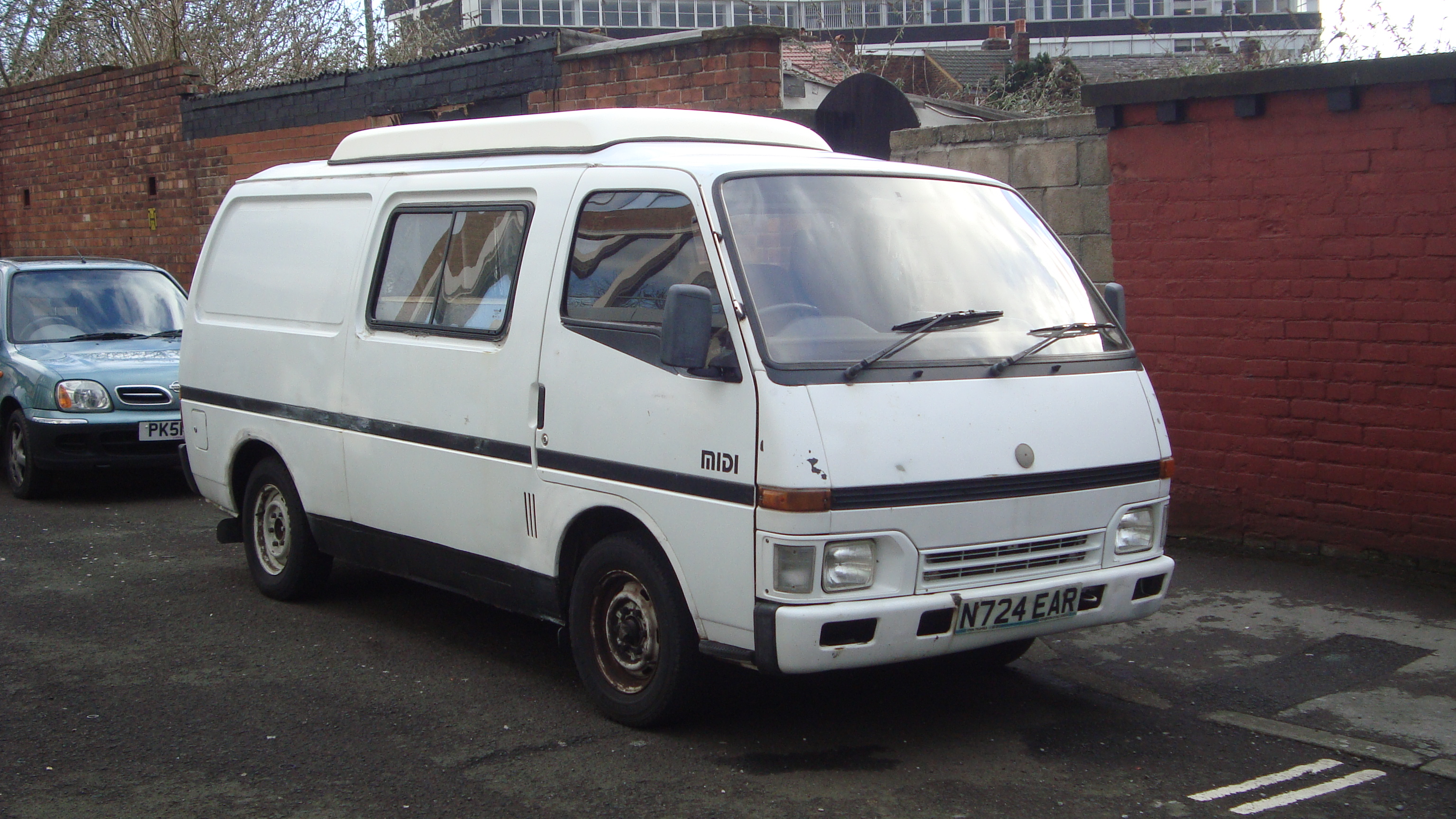
Vauxhall Midi (United Kingdom)

Vauxhall Albany, an upmarket version of the Bedford/Vauxhall Midi (United Kingdom)

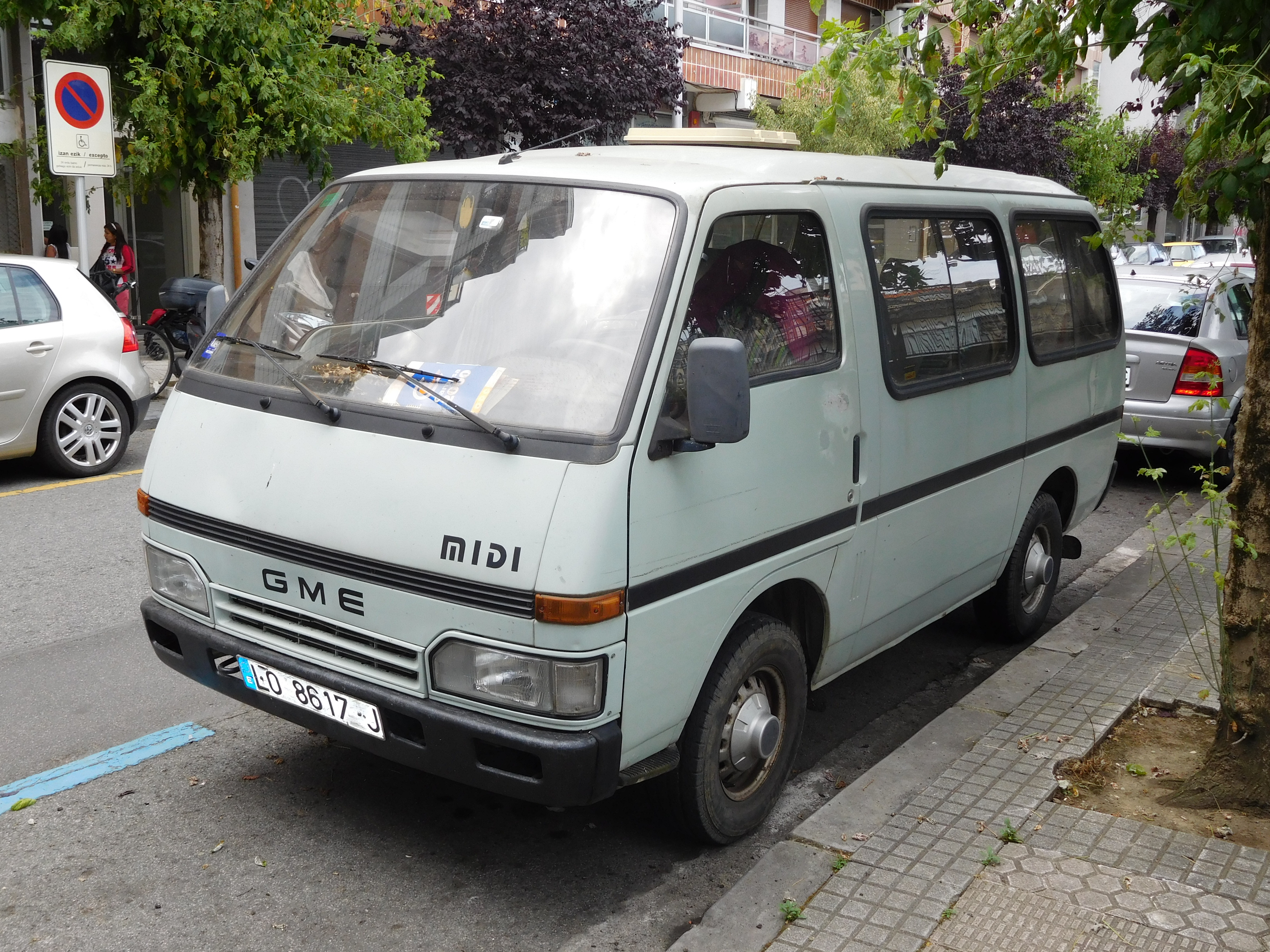
GME Midi (Spain)

=== Bedford Midi / Vauxhall Midi ===
General Motors-owned Vauxhall Motors offered a version of the Fargo as the Bedford Midi between 1985 and 1994. Following the sale of the Bedford Vehicles to AWD, the Bedford Midi was rebadged as the Vauxhall Midi. Versions sold in continental Europe and Ireland were sold under various names, including Bedford Seta (in Portugal), General Motors Midi, GME Midi (in Spain), and Isuzu Midi. Between 1983 and 1988, Industries Mécaniques Maghrébines (IMM) produced the Isuzu Midi at its Kairouan, Tunisia, manufacturing facility.

Built in Luton, the Midi brought few changes to the Japanese Fargo and replaced the old Bedford CF van. This was very much a stop-gap design to replace the old CF range, but a true CF replacement never came. The van also signified the end of Bedford, and its own designs as GM used other companies designs it co owned as a cheaper option. Talks were held with Freight Rover during 1985 to produce the Sherpa 300 series van under licence; the idea was abandoned by the end of 1986.

Also, concerns arose over its crashworthiness in this same issue, following a test on the Japanese-built WFR. Engines offered were both petrol (1.8- and 2.0-litre) and diesel (2.0-, 2.2-, or 2.4-litre turbo). The Midi could be ordered with either an old fashioned, column-mounted gear change allowing a third central passenger seat in the front, or with a conventional floor shift, and was available in short and long wheelbases with a choice of standard or high roof lines. A minibus version, named the Albany, was also produced.

The Midi was also restyled in 1989 and given a new dashboard panel and seating, together with new door trims and front end fascia. The engine range remained much the same. While production ceased in 1994, SWB models were replaced by the Vauxhall Arena, while the LWB models were replaced in 1997 by the Vauxhall Movano, both of which were based on Renault products.

=== Holden Shuttle ===
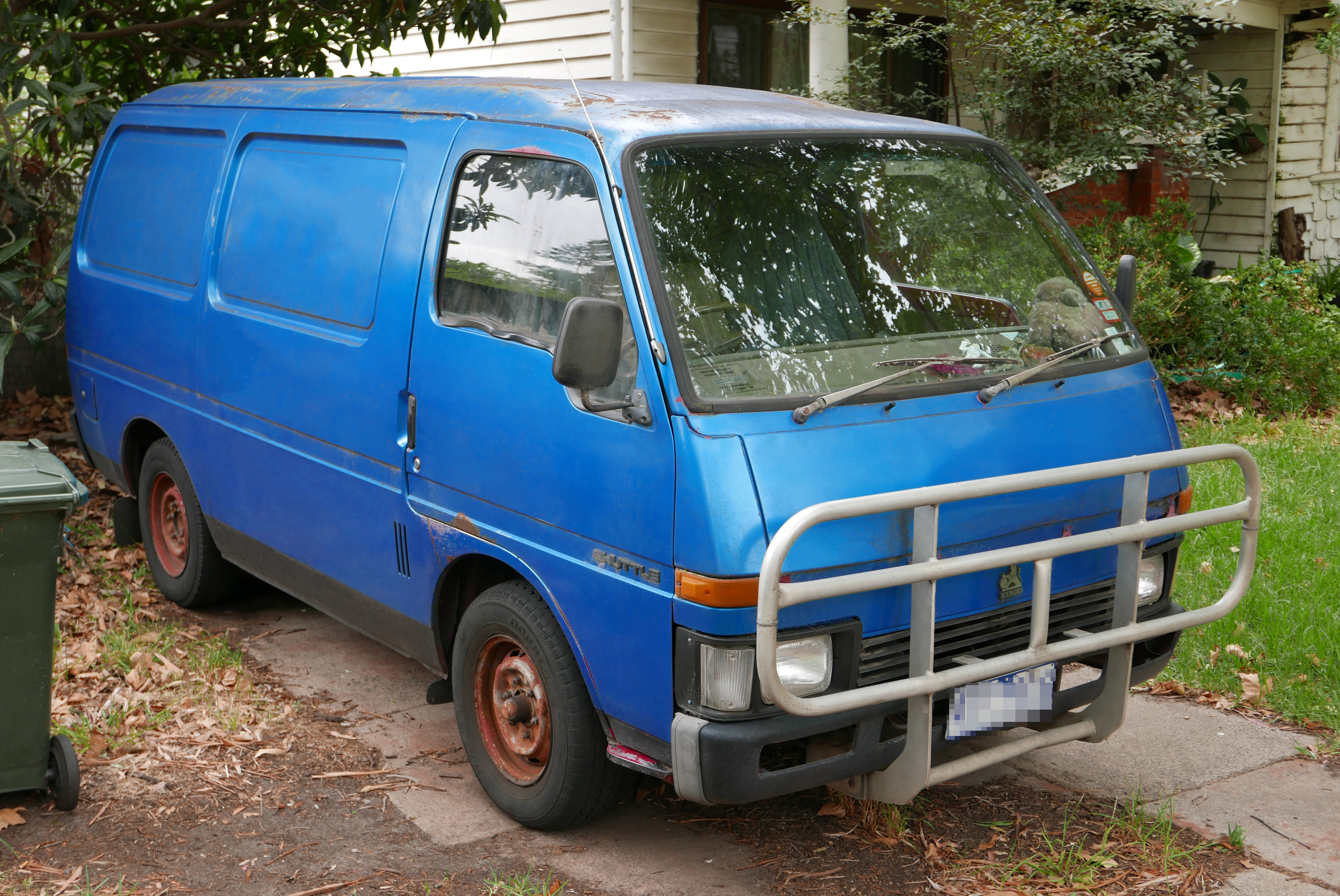
Holden Shuttle

General Motors' (GM) Australian subsidiary, Holden released the Isuzu Fargo van in February 1982 as the WFR series Holden Shuttle. The original release Shuttle was available in short and long wheelbase guises, in combination with either low or high roofs, all available with or without side cargo windows.

Two engines were initially offered: a 1.8-litre 4ZB1 petrol engine rated at 65 kW (87 hp), and a 2.0-litre 4FC1 diesel putting out 44 kW (59 hp). In 1986, the 1.8 petrol was withdrawn and replaced by the 2.0 litre 4ZC1 petrol producing 69 kW (93 hp). All three engines were coupled with a four speed manual transmission.

The single, cargo-carrying model was accompanied by the limited edition LS—a highly specified 9-seater people-mover variant in October 1982. Only 250 were built for Australian consumption; however, in August 1983, Holden introduced the LT 9-seater people mover. The lower-specification LT was not equipped with many of the LS Shuttle's luxury features, including the dual-zone air conditioning.

An AM/FM radio with compact cassette player and a digital clock were standard on the LT, with single zone air conditioning available as an option. Both the LS and LT were powered exclusively by the petrol engine.

The Shuttle was subject to several minor facelifts and running changes over its production run. In the middle of 1983, a centre front seat was added. This consisted of two outer bucket seats and a centre bench seat, giving the impression of a single bench.

June 1985 had the model range restructured, with the five-speed manual transmission from the LS and LT models now standard on the base model. A facelifted model came in June 1986, involving the relocation of badging, re shaped headlamps, and newly designed steel wheels for the base Shuttle.

This refresh coincided with a reduced line up; Holden deleted the diesel and long wheelbase options. From December 1987, a four speed automatic transmission option was made available, and the LT people mover variant was removed—transforming the Shuttle into a single model range. Holden discontinued the Shuttle in 1990, and opted not to replace it with another model. The Shuttle's immediate predecessor were the Bedford CF vans sourced from the United Kingdom. These Bedford vans were not however, distributed under the "Holden" brand.

== Second generation (1995–2001) ==
Second generation
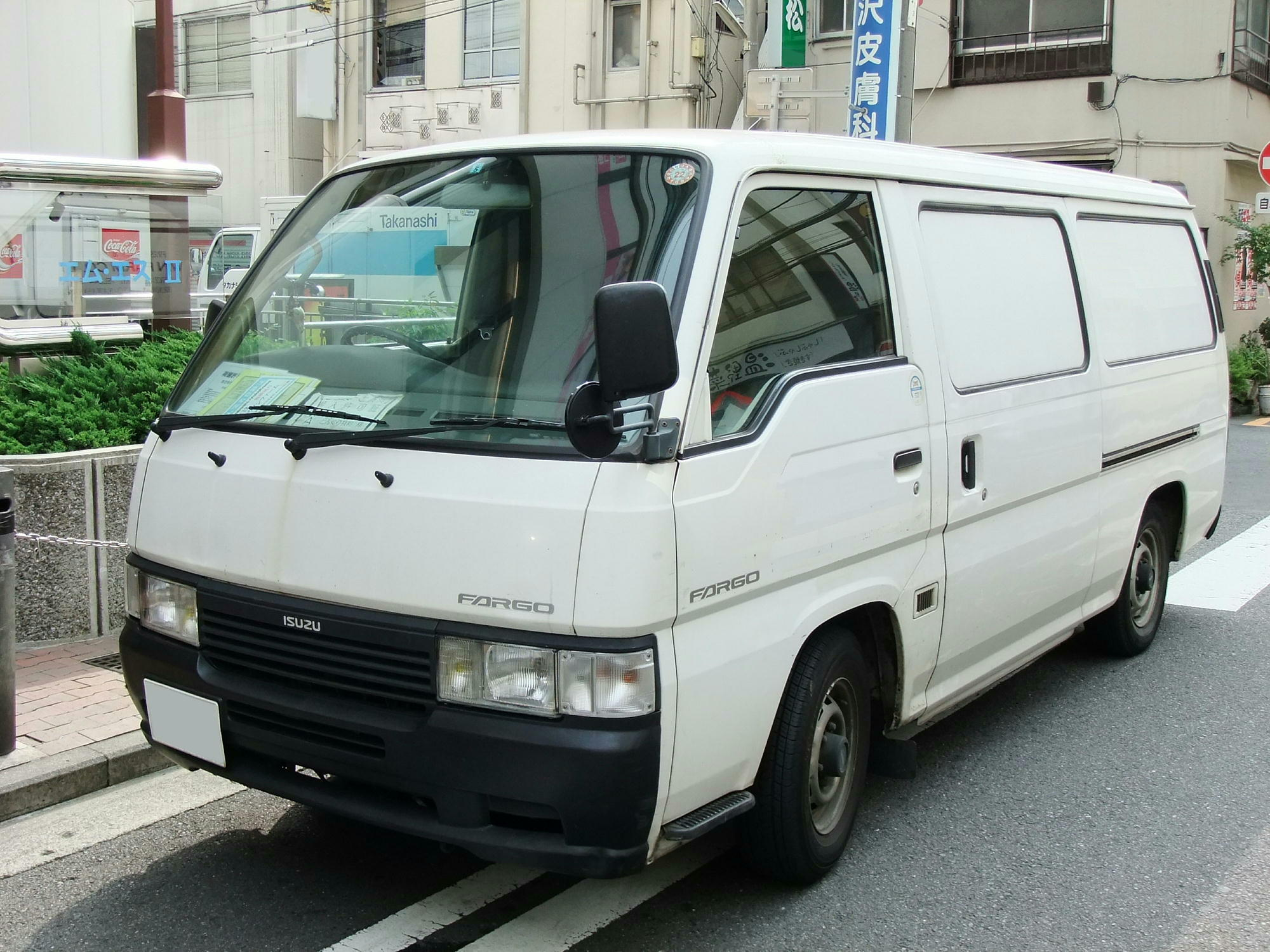

Overview
- Manufacturer: Isuzu
- Also called: Nissan Caravan/Urvan/Homy
- Production: 1995–2001
- Assembly: Japan: Fujisawa, Kanagawa (Fujisawa Plant)

Body and chassis
- Body style: 3-door van

Chronology
- Successor: Isuzu Como

- August 1995: All new model, now a badge-engineered Nissan Caravan/Urvan (E24) van.
- June 1999: Modified gasoline engine
- May 2001: Discontinuation
