= VAS =

VAS or Vas may refer to:

== Places ==
- Vas County, a county in Hungary
- Vas County (former), a former county of the Kingdom of Hungary
- Vas, Kostel, a village in Slovenia
- Vas, Veneto, a frazione of Quero Vas, Italy

== People ==
=== Surname ===
- Abdul Vas (born 1981), Venezuelan artist
- Anukreethy Vas (born 1998), Indian model and beauty pageant winner
- Imre Vas (born 1966), Hungarian jurist and politician
- János Vas (born 1984), Hungarian ice hockey player
- Joseph Vas (born 1955), American politician
- Márton Vas (born 1980), Hungarian ice hockey player
- Robert Vas (1931–1978), Hungarian film director

=== Given name ===
- Vas Blackwood (born 1962), British actor
- Vas Coleman (born 1999), professionally known as Yung Bans, American rapper and songwriter
- Vas J Morgan (born 1988), English television personality
- Vas Nuñez (born 1995), Hong Kong footballer

== Science and medicine ==
- Vas (moth), a genus of moths in the family Erebidae
- Vas deferens, connecting the left and right epididymis to the ejaculatory ducts in male anatomy
- Vaccine-associated sarcoma, a type of malignant tumor found in cats
- Victoria Archaeological Survey, a government organization in Victoria, Australia
- Visual analogue scale, a psychometric response scale
- Vitamin A supplementation

== Technology ==
- Value-added service, a telecommunications industry term
- Vector addition system, a mathematical modeling language
- Vehicle-activated sign
- Virtual address space
- Bedford VAS, a British chassis for buses and coaches produced between 1963 and 1987

== Other uses ==
- Left Alliance (Finland) (Finnish: Vasemmistoliitto), a political party in Finland
- Vas (band), a musical group
- Victory at Sea, a 1952 documentary television series
- Victory at Sea (game), a set of naval wargames rules
- Visual Arts Scotland
