= Bedford TM =

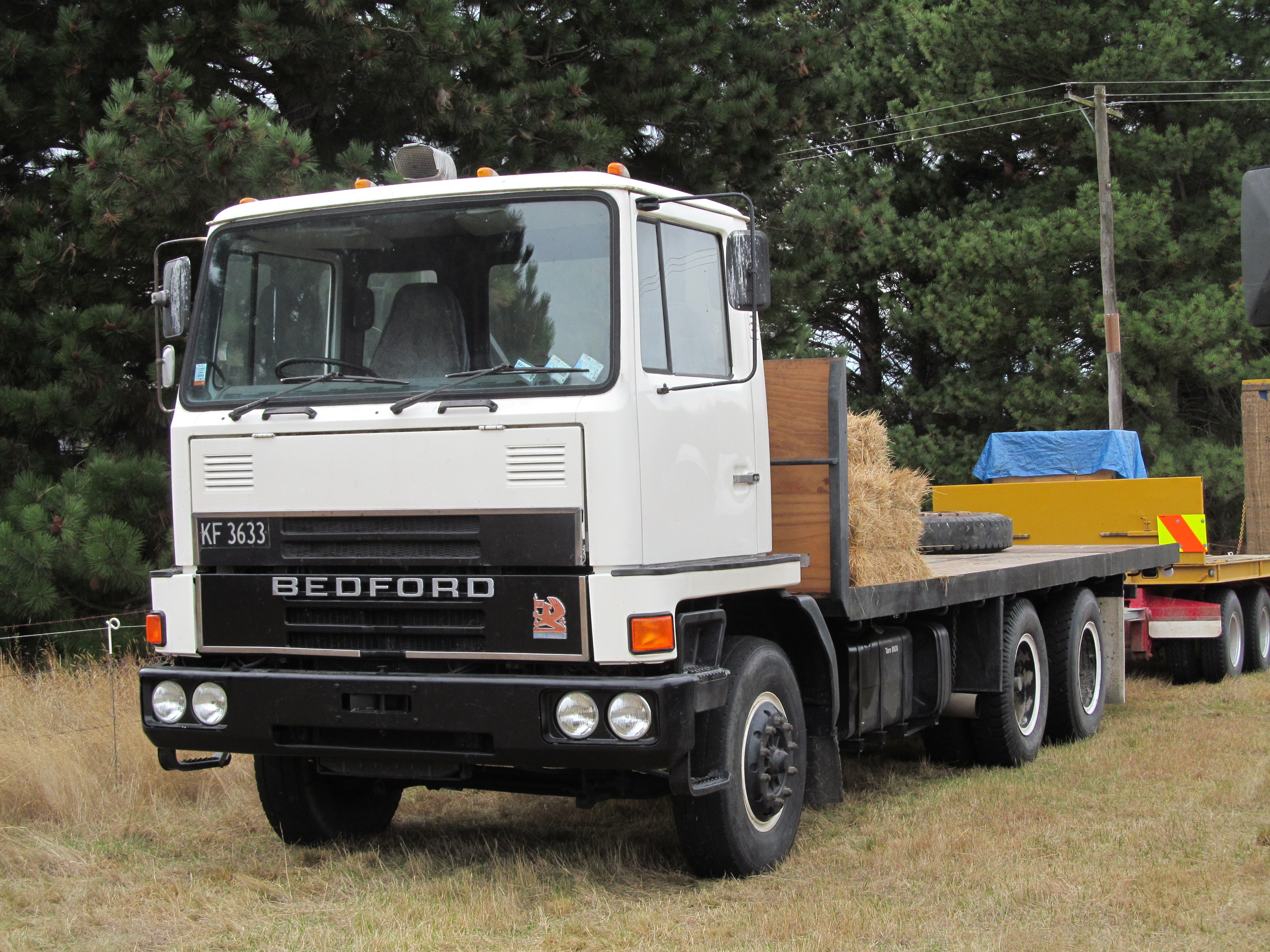

Overview
- Manufacturer: Bedford
- Production: 1974-1986; 1988-1992 (AWD Trucks)
- Assembly: Dunstable

Body and chassis
- Class: Commercial vehicle
- Body style: Chassis cab Tractor unit

Powertrain
- Engine: Bedford; Cummins; Detroit Diesel Caterpillar Inc. (Multidrive Only)
- Transmission: Eaton; Fuller; Spicer

The Bedford TM was a heavy goods vehicle manufactured by Bedford Vehicles between 1974 and 1986. Until the TM, Bedford had been building mostly low-specification short-haul distribution trucks such as the Bedford TK and KM. In view of the increasing popularity of high cabs in the maximum-weight long-distance category, such as the Leyland Marathon, Scania L110 and Volvo F88, Bedford designed the TM as a competitor.

== History ==
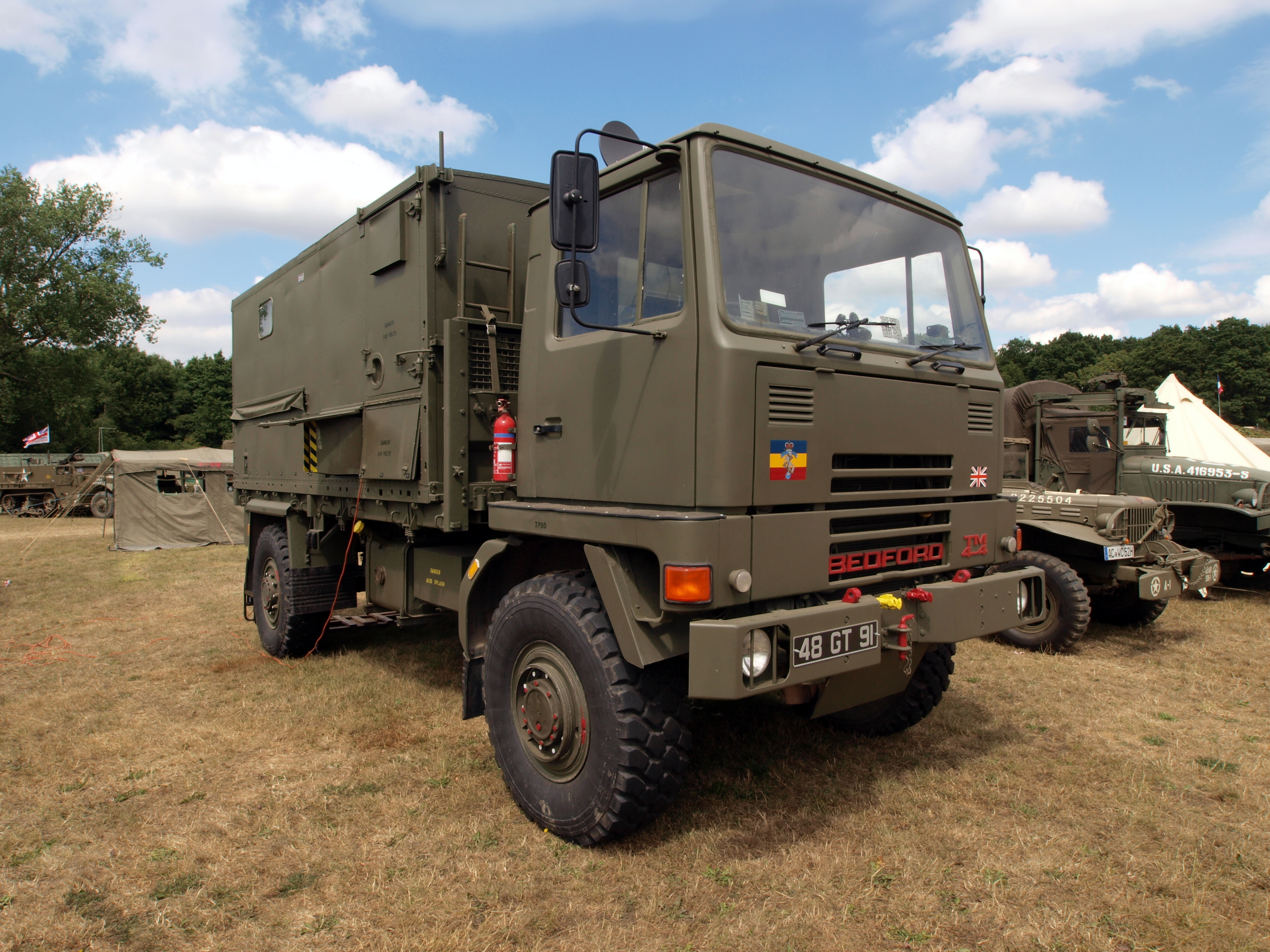
British Army Bedford TM

The TM was introduced in 1974. A thorough update in 1982 left the appearance mostly untouched, perhaps to the detriment of sales of what was a substantially new model. Improvements included the new Detroit Diesel Series 92 engine, a new chassis, many new engine and transmission options, and a variety of other updated fittings. The Fuller transmissions now received a new telescopic shift mechanism, allowing the cabin floor to be sealed. The cab was counterbalanced so as to allow one-man tilting, and two front flaps allowed access to check on vitals. Production ceased in 1986 with the closure of the Bedford company.

== Powertrain ==
Through its lifespan, it was available with a Bedford 500 turbo engine also known as the 8.2 Blue, a Detroit Diesel two-stroke V6 and V8 or a Cummins L10, coupled to either a Fuller or Spicer transmission, and a SOMA rear axle (dropped after the 1982 facelift). The Detroit engine was not a successful choice in the UK. Because of its high-revving characteristics, it proved unpopular with drivers, who were used to slow revving, long stroke, UK diesels. It was also disliked by operators because of its poor fuel economy.

== Variants ==
Available as either an articulated tractor unit, or as a rigid, in either wide or narrow day and sleeper cabs, the TM was actually a highly competent vehicle, and over the years was a common sight with some of the larger UK operators. It offered new standards of comfort and refinement especially for a Bedford. The British Army purchased thousands of four-wheel drive and six-wheel drive variants, some of which remained in use in 2010.

AWD tried to market a 6x4 version under the Multidrive brand, targeting it to construction markets, although only a few were built, some of which were sold to the MoD (which deployed them into Operation Desert Storm) and the Central Military Command in Dubai. The Multidrive brand was later sold to Caterpillar, that started producing the Multidrive M8-Series.
