= Bedford QL =

British military truck family

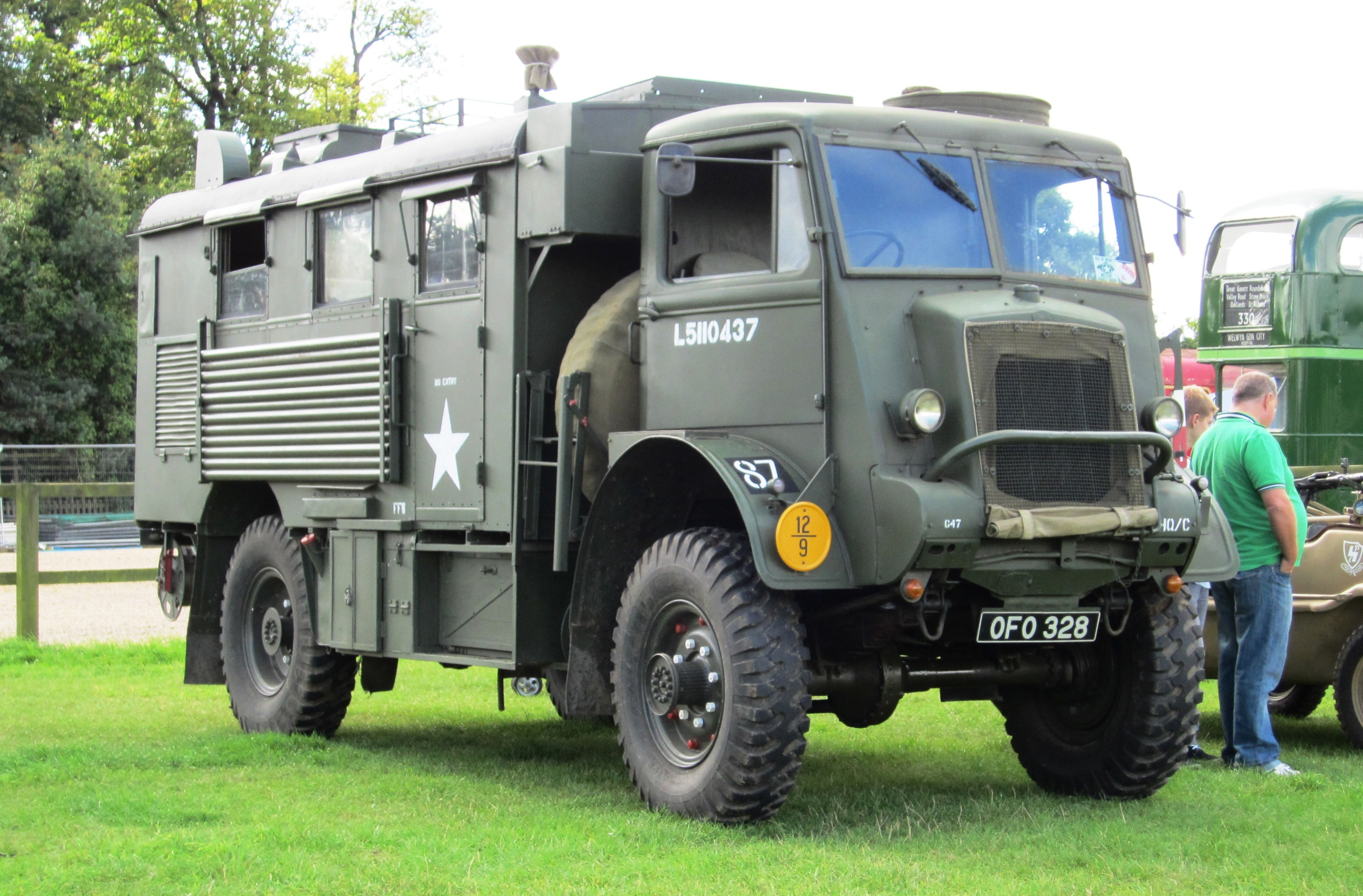
- A QLR on show
- Place of origin: England

Service history
- Used by: British Armed Forces
- Wars: World War II

Production history
- Manufacturer: Bedford
- Produced: 1941-1945
- No. built: 52,247
- Variants: QL1, QLB, QLC, QLD, QLR, QLT & QLW

Specifications
- Mass: 7,225 lb (3,277 kg) (empty); 15,400 lb (6,985 kg) (loaded)
- Length: 5.99 m (19 ft 8 in)
- Width: 2.26 m (7 ft 5 in)
- Height: 10 feet / 2.54m
- Crew: 1 + 11 passengers
- Armour: none
- Engine: Bedford, 6-cyl 3,519 cc (214.7 cu in) petrol 72 hp (54 kW)
- Payload capacity: 3 tons
- Suspension: Wheel, 4x4
- Operational range: 156 mi (250 km)

The Bedford QL was a series of trucks manufactured by Bedford for use by the British Armed Forces in World War II.

== History ==
At the outbreak of World War II, Bedford was contracted by the War Office to produce a 3 ton 4×4 general service truck. A pilot model was ready in February 1940 and quantity production started in March 1941. The Bedford QL was in production from 1941 to 1945 and was Bedford's first vehicle series built for the military. A total of 52,247 were produced.

== Variants ==
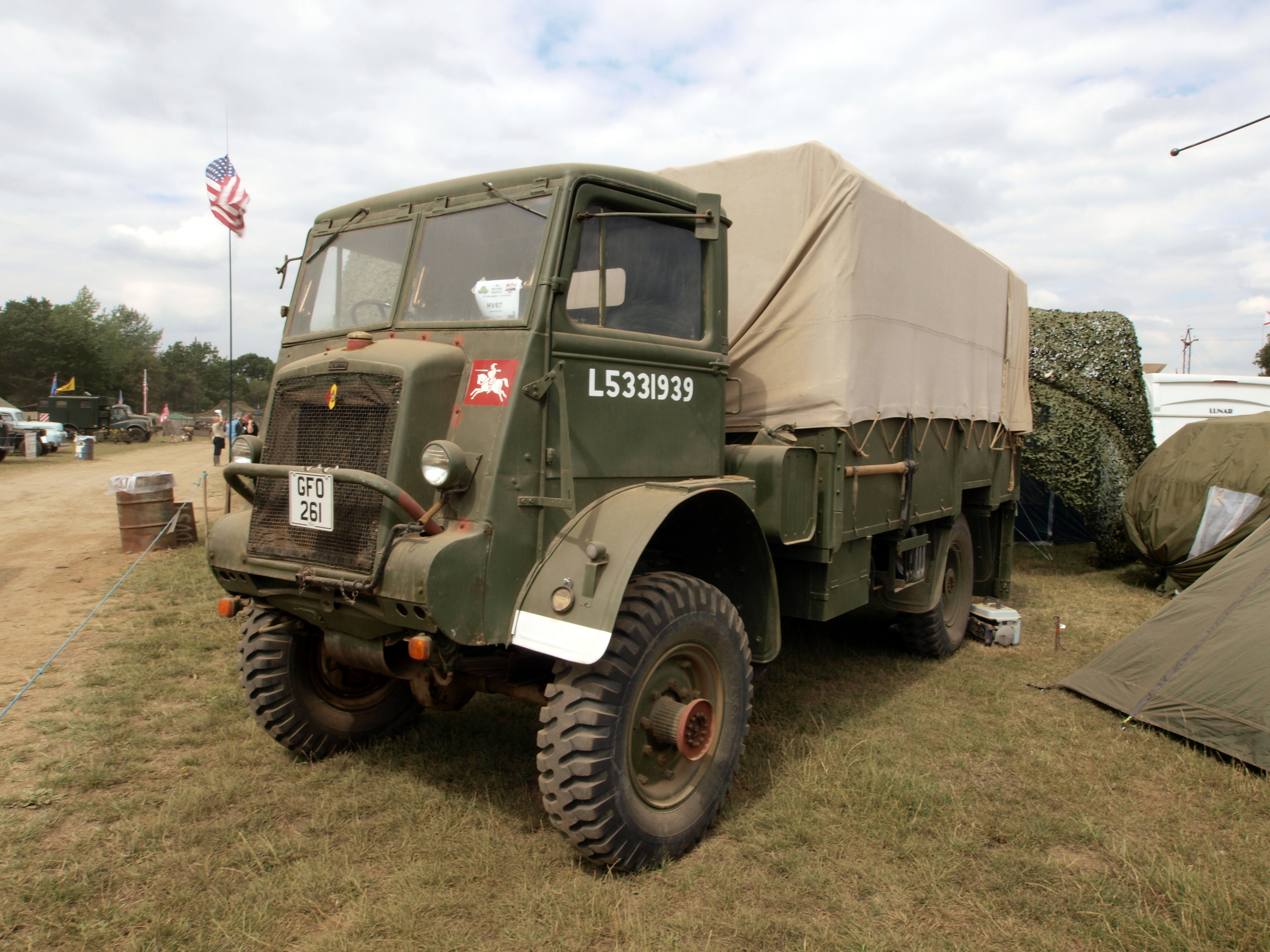
QLD

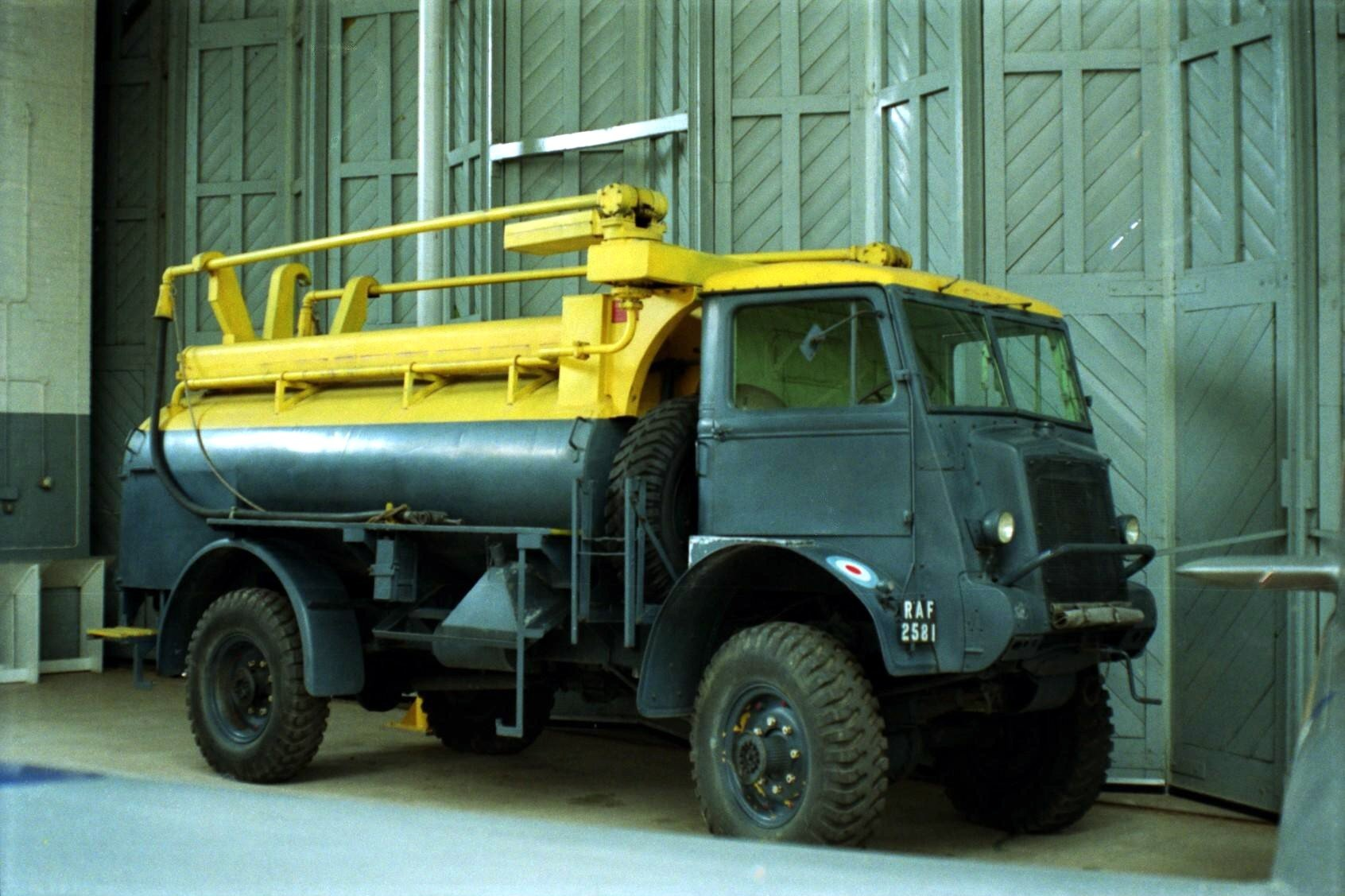
Preserved RAF QL refuelling tanker at IWM Duxford

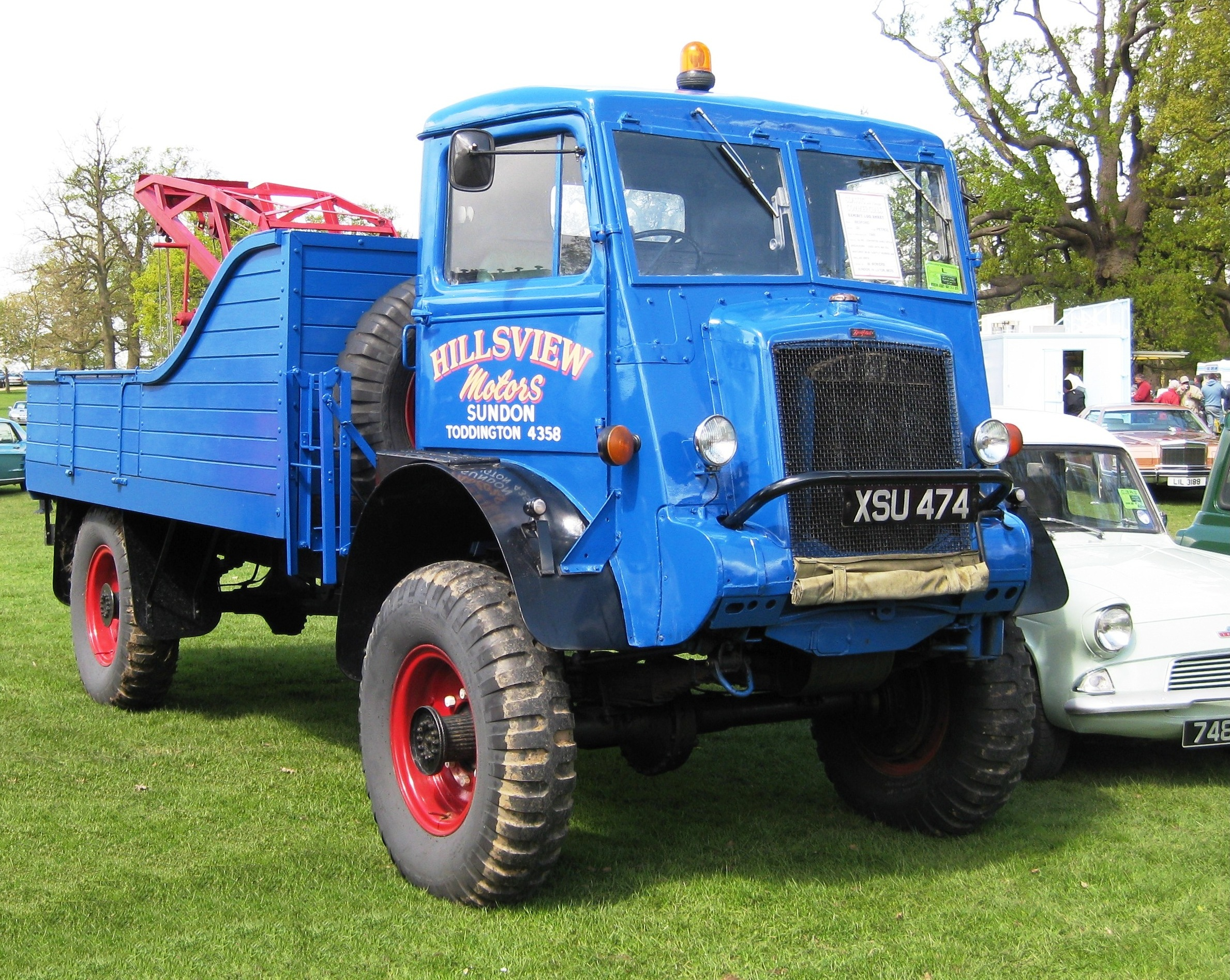
Bedford QL Breakdown Truck

QL1
Prototype.
QLB
Bofors gun tractor. Approximately 5,500 QLBs were built.

Several QLBs were fitted with shortened GS bodies and recovery cranes to be used as wreckers by the Danish Army (Used until late 1960s).

QLC
Fire engine.
Signals vehicle.
Petrol tanker.
QLD
General service cargo truck and was the most numerous version in the series.

Machinery.
Kitchen.
Battery storage.

QLR
Signals vehicle. Originally mounted on the QLC chassis/cab, special QLR chassis were soon put into production, which differed from the standard type in having special electrical equipment, radio suppression, fitment of a 660 W auxiliary generator driven by the transfer case power-take-off and, like the QLT, two 16 gallon petrol tanks instead of one behind the cab. The interior furniture, partitioning and radio equipment varied with the different functions. On vehicles installed for the wireless role, a tent could be erected at the rear. Between the cab and main body were lockers for aerial masts and other equipment. Beneath the body were further lockers and racks for cable drums, batteries, tyre chains, 20 gallon drinking water tank, rectifier box, tools, fuel tank for the auxiliary engine, jerrycans and other items. The body shells were produced by Duple, Lagonda, Mulliner, Tickford and others. A revised body was introduced during 1944 for the Command High and Low Power and Wireless High Power roles. This body had an improved L-shaped tent which could be erected alongside the left-hand side and rear of the body.
QLT
Troop carrier. From August 1941 and until the end of WW II more than 3,300 QLTs were produced.
QLW
Air portable tipper.
Lorry, 3 ton, GS Bedford half-track (Bedford-Bren)
Following the fall of Singapore, rubber was scarce and so, at the request of the Ministry of Supply, a Bedford QL was adapted using a Carden Lloyd suspension taken from a Bren Gun Carrier. While the Bedford-Bren was capable of impressive feats of tractive power (which could have been easily produced in its own right as a prime mover) British authorities, unlike the Americans and Germans, did not favour the half-track. The shortage of rubber was not as severe as anticipated and official interest in the project waned. Not only did this British parallel to the German Maultier not go into production, the single prototype was converted back into an all-wheel vehicle.
Lorry, 3 ton, 4 x 4, Bedford, experimental (Bedford Giraffe)
An attempt to make a motor vehicle capable of deep wading for river crossings and amphibious landing, the Bedford Giraffe was developed as insurance against the shallow wading kits under development not proving effective in deeper water. As a 'plan B', Vauxhall adapted a Bedford GL by mounting its engine, cab and gearbox on an elevated girder frame some seven feet high, with a chain drive transmitting power to the propshaft. The ungainly but effective vehicle demonstrated it was a viable solution should hastily extemporised waterproofing kits fail but they proved effective and so no specialised type was required.
