= Bedford Vehicles =

Brand of vehicle produced by Vauxhall Motors

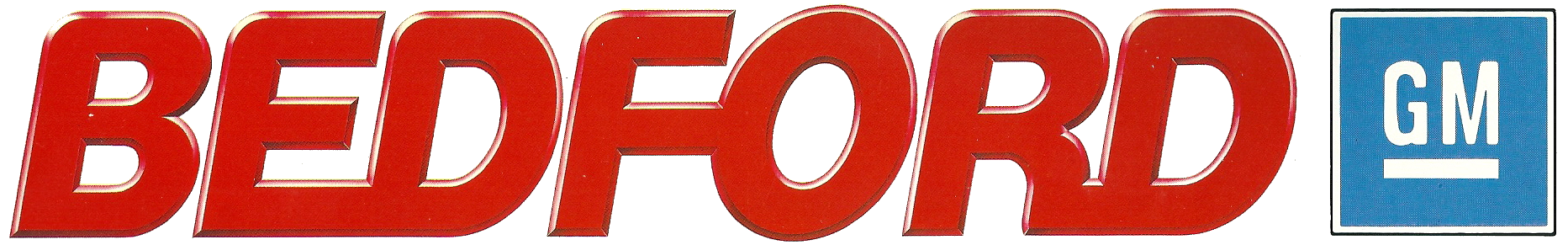
- Type: Division
- Industry: Automotive
- Founded: 1931; 95 years ago
- Founder: Vauxhall Motors
- Defunct: 1986; 40 years ago
- Fate: Divested into IBC Vehicles and AWD Trucks
- Successor: AWD Trucks; IBC Vehicles
- Headquarters: Luton, England
- Area served: Worldwide
- Products: Bus chassis Military vehicles Trucks; Light commercial vehicles
- Parent: Vauxhall Motors

Bedford Vehicles, usually shortened to just Bedford, was a brand of vehicle manufactured by Vauxhall Motors, then a subsidiary of multinational corporation General Motors. Established in April 1931, Bedford Vehicles was set up to build commercial vehicles. The company was a leading international lorry brand, with substantial export sales of light, medium, and heavy lorries throughout the world.

Bedford's core heavy trucks business was divested by General Motors (GM) as AWD Trucks in 1987, whilst the Bedford brand continued to be used on light commercial vehicles and car-derived vans based on Vauxhall/Opel, Isuzu and Suzuki designs. The brand was retired in 1990.

The van manufacturing plant of Bedford, part of Vauxhall Luton, was closed in March 2025.

== History ==
Until 1925, General Motors assembled trucks in Britain from parts manufactured at its Canadian works. This enabled them to import vehicles into Britain under Imperial Preference, which favoured products from the British Empire as far as import duties were concerned. Such trucks were marketed as "British Chevrolet".

In November 1925, GM purchased Vauxhall Motors with production transferred from Hendon to Luton, Vauxhall's headquarters, production commencing there in 1929. The brand was retired in May 1990.

=== 1930s ===
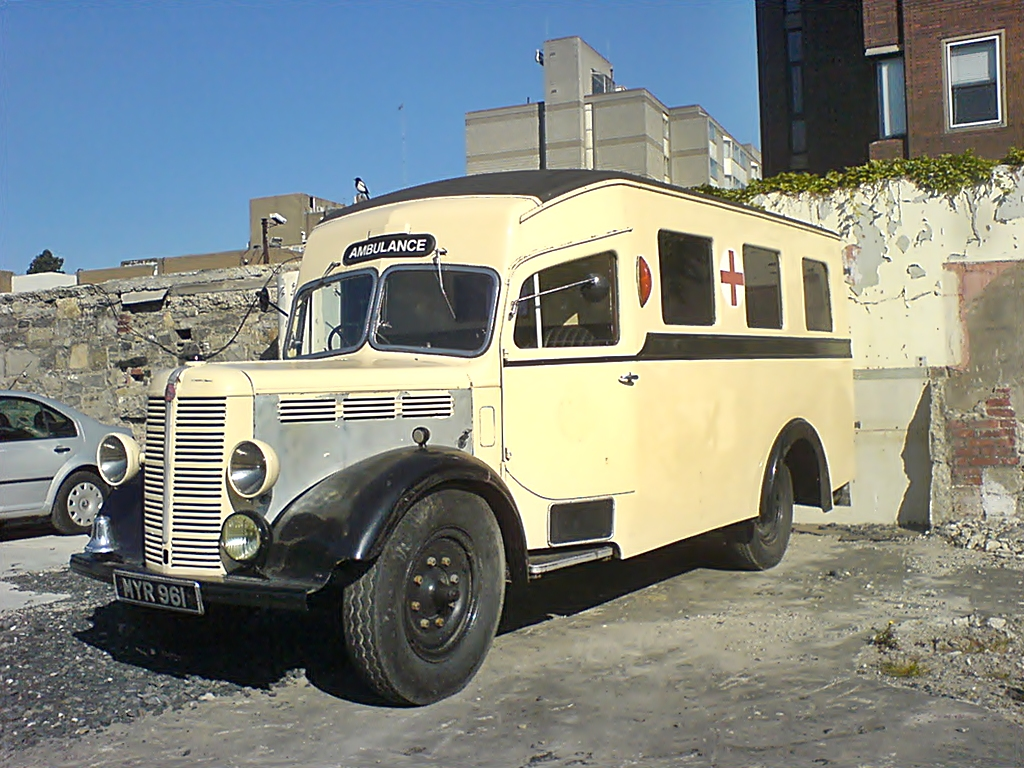
Bedford ambulance

The AC and LQ models were produced at Luton from 1929 to 1931, and styled as the "Chevrolet Bedford", taking the name from the county town of Bedfordshire, in which Luton is located. The AC was bodied as a light van (12 cwt), and the LQ in a wide variety of roles, including a lorry, ambulance, van and bus versions. The name "Chevrolet" was dropped, and the first Bedford was produced in April 1931. This vehicle, a 2-ton lorry, was virtually indistinguishable from its LQ Chevrolet predecessor, apart from detail styling of the radiator, and was available as the WHG with a 10 feet 11 inches (3,330 mm) wheelbase, or as the WLG with a longer wheelbase of 13 feet 1 inch (3,990 mm). However, the Chevrolet LQ and AC continued in production alongside the new product for a further year. In August 1931, a bus chassis was added to the range, and was designated WHB and WLB.

A large part of Bedford's original success in breaking into the UK and British Empire markets lay in the overhead-valve (OHV) six-cylinder Chevrolet engine, now known as Chevrolet Stovebolt engine – well ahead of its time, this smooth running inline six-cylinder engine formed the basis of Bedford and Vauxhall petrol engines almost until the marque ceased building trucks and buses.

In April 1932, a 30 cwt lorry was introduced, together with a 12 cwt light delivery van, designated as the WS and VYC models respectively. Bedford continued to develop its share of the light transport market, with the introduction of the 8 cwt ASYC and ASXC vans, a close derivative of the Vauxhall Light Six car. The AS series of vans continued in production until 1939.

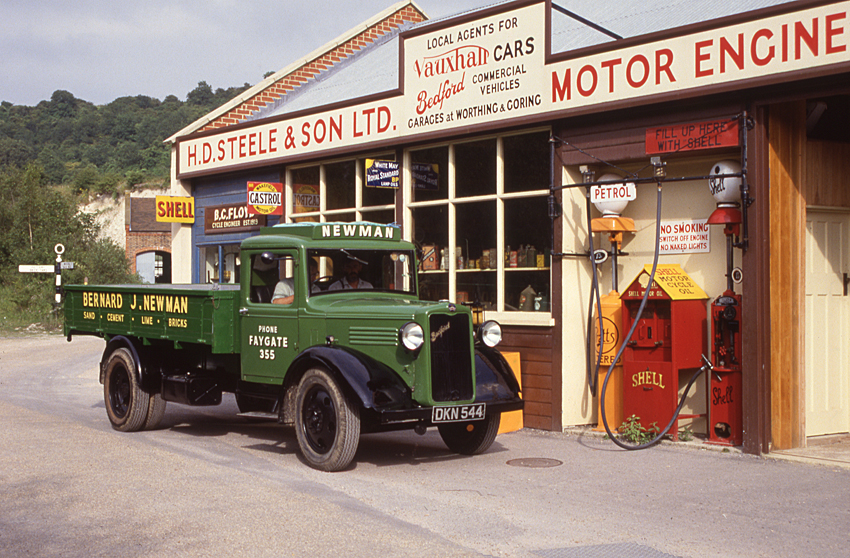
1936 Bedford WTL lorry at Amberley Working Museum

Bedford introduced the 3 ton WT series in November 1933. Again, a short wheelbase WHT (9 feet 3 inches (2,820 mm)), or long wheelbase WLG (13 feet 1 inch (3,990 mm)) version was offered. A change in design of the WLG produced the WTL, with its cab, internal combustion engine and radiator moved forward to allow a 14 feet (4.3 m) bodylength. In 1935, the WTB bus version appeared, and the WS and VYC models were updated – the latter being redesignated BYC as it was fitted with the engine and synchromesh gearbox of the Big Six Vauxhall cars. The 5–6 cwt HC light van was introduced in 1938, based on the Vauxhall Ten car, and the WT and WS acquired a newly styled grill.

Mid -1939 saw a complete revamp of Bedfords, with only the HC van continuing in production. The new range consisted of the K (30–40 cwt), MS and ML (2–3 ton), OS and OL (3–4 ton), OS/40 and OL/40 (5 ton) series, and the OB bus. Also on offer was a new 10–12 cwt van, the JC, derived from the new J Model Vauxhall car. Many of the trucks sold by Bedford between June and September 1939 were requisitioned for military use on the outbreak of World War II; many were abandoned after the retreat from Dunkirk, rendered useless to the enemy by removing the engine oil drain plug and running the engine. Because the German armed forces in 1940 were, contrary to their popular image, desperately short of motor transport, many of these captured Bedfords were repaired and pressed into service alongside Opel Blitz (also part of GM) trucks by the German armed forces – although the Bedfords mainly filled second-line roles, including civil defence.

Production of the new range ceased, apart from a few examples made for essential civilian duties, when Bedford went onto a war footing. Production resumed in 1945.

=== World War II ===
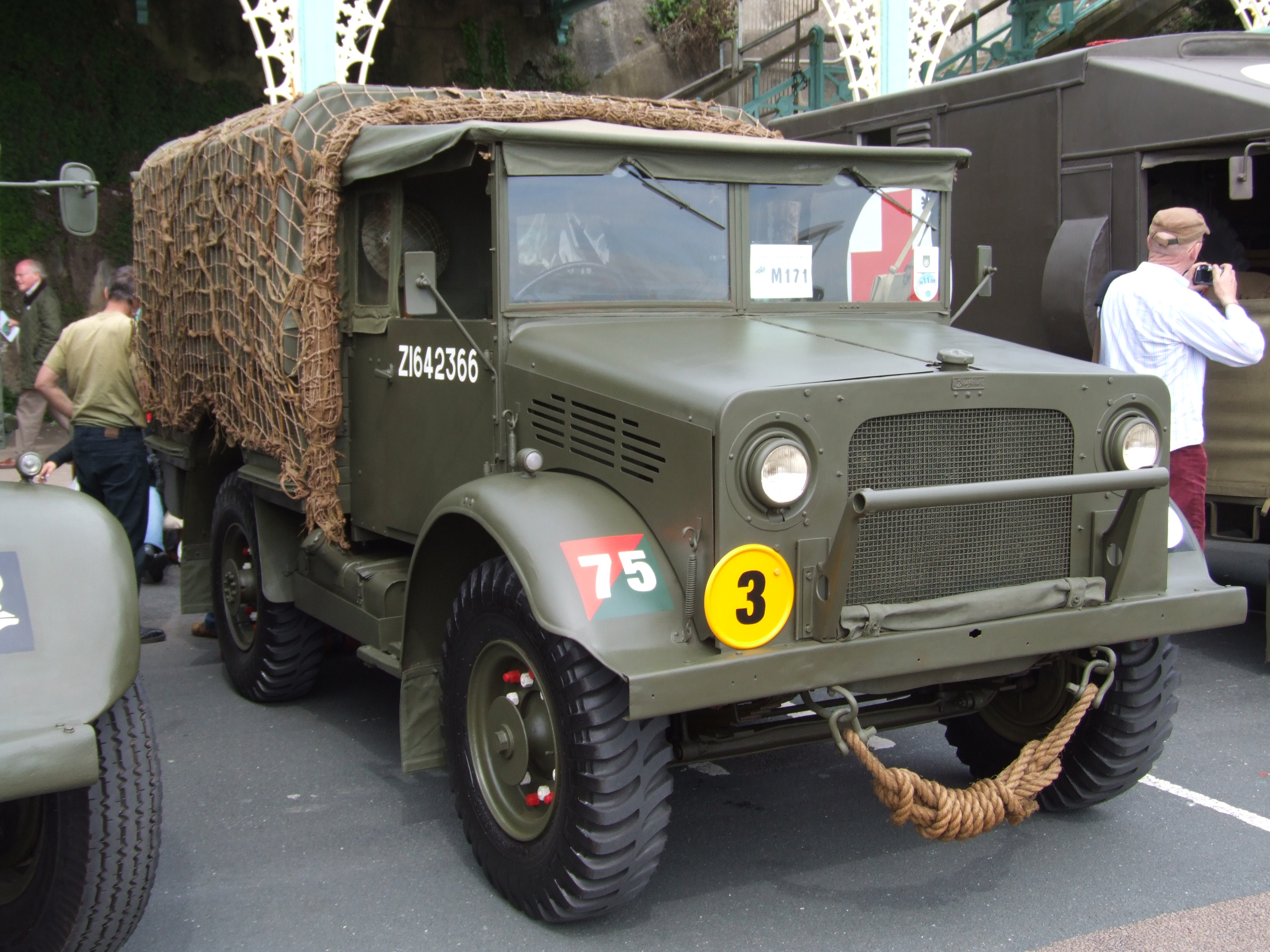
1943 Bedford MW utility vehicle

In 1935, Bedford began the development of a 15 cwt truck for the British War Office. This entered service as the MW in 1939, and 65,995 examples had been built by the end of the war in 1945. The MW appeared in a wide range of roles, as a water tanker, general duties truck, personnel carrier, petrol tanker, wireless truck and anti-aircraft gun tractor – among others.

The War Office designated 15 cwt vehicles, such as the MW, as trucks, and larger vehicles as lorries.

The 1939 K-, M-, and O-series lorries were quickly redesigned for military use. This was largely a matter of styling, involving a sloping bonnet with a flat front with headlights incorporated and a crash bar to protect the radiator in a minor collision. The military versions were designated OX and OY series, and again were put to a wide range of tasks, including mobile canteens, tankers, general purpose lorries, and a version with a Tasker semi-trailer used by the Royal Air Force to transport dismantled or damaged aircraft. This variant was popularly known as the Queen Mary. A number of Bedford OXD 1.5 ton chassis were converted to make the Bedford OXA armoured vehicle. A total of 72,385 OY and 24,429 OX lorries were built. The Armadillo was an OY fitted for airfield defence with Lewis guns and an ex-aircraft COW 37 mm gun.

Bedford supplied numerous trucks and tanks to the Soviet Union during World War II.

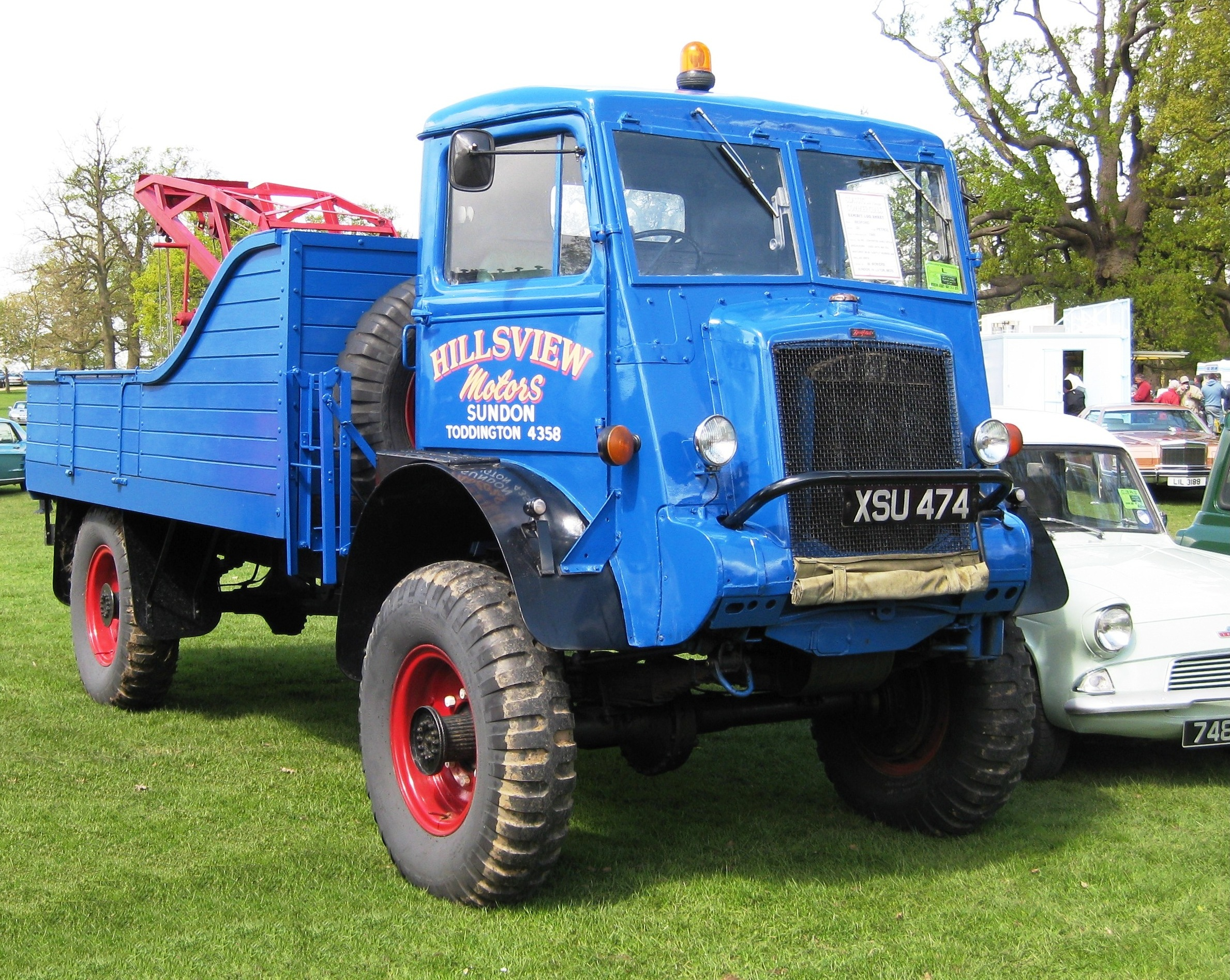
The war-time Bedford QL, with the driver perched above the engine in a forward control cab, foreshadowed post-war truck designs.

A radical departure from Bedford's design norms came in October 1939, with the development of a four-wheel drive, forward control lorry, which entered service in March 1941 as the QL, quickly nicknamed the "Queen Lizzie". As with the MW and OY / OX models, the QL went on to serve in a large number of roles, such as artillery tractor, gun porter, command vehicle, wireless lorry and petrol tanker, as well as the troop-carrying QLD, the most common variant. An experimental version used the track unit of a Bren gun carrier (or Universal Carrier), as an answer to the German half-track vehicles, which had superior cross-country capability. Production ran at around 12,000 units per year between 1942 and 1944. Many QLs and other Bedford World War II military vehicles served with the British Army, and other forces into the 1960s, and many others were purchased for civilian use after the war.

After the Dunkirk evacuation in June 1940, the British Army had around 100 tanks, most of which were obsolete and inferior to the German tanks of the day. Vauxhall Motors was given one year to design and produce a suitable heavy tank. In May 1941, the Churchill tank derived from work on the A22 tank with Harland & Wolff went into production at Luton, some 5,640 units and 2,000 spare engines being produced at Luton, and other sites under contract to Vauxhall. The resultant need to continue truck production brought about the development of the new Bedford Dunstable plant, which came online in 1942.

For wartime production the OB was temporarily replaced by the "utility" OWB, with which Bedford became the only British manufacturer authorised to build single-deck buses during hostilities.

Apart from vehicle manufacture during World War II, Vauxhall Motors produced steel helmets, RP-3 rocket bodies, and components for Frank Whittle's top-secret jet engine.

=== 1950s ===
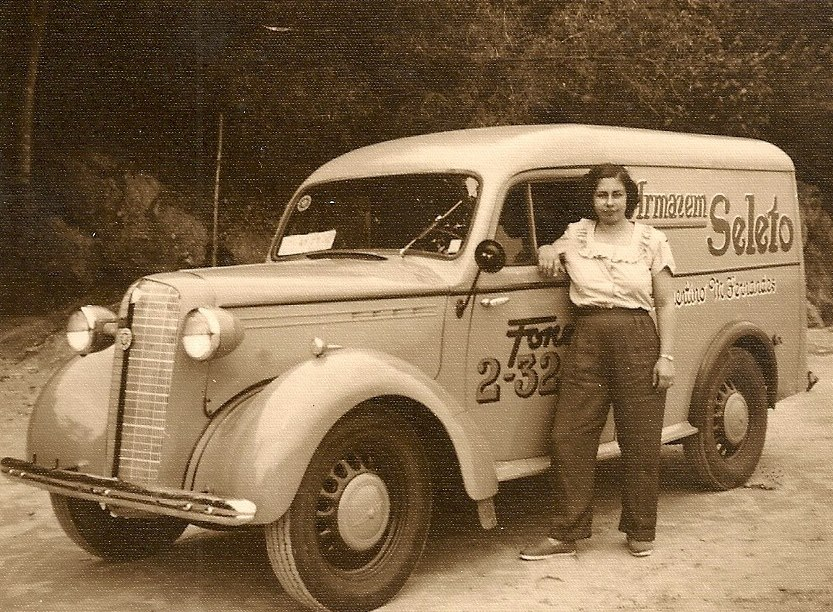
Bedford PC Van 1950

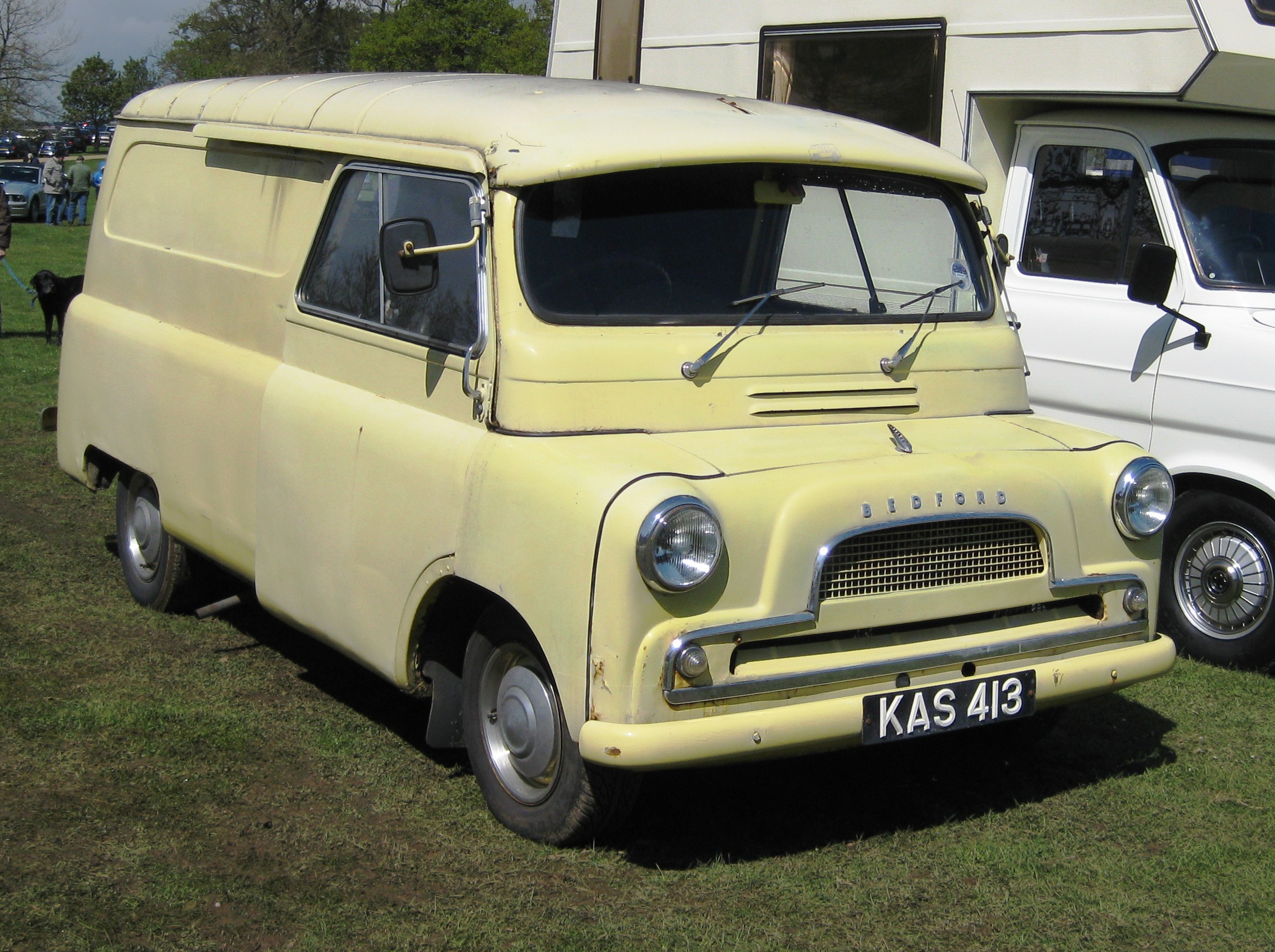
A Bedford CA type new in 1959

The HC 5–6 cwt van continued briefly after the war, and the JC 10–12 cwt was fitted with the column gear change; and engine from the Vauxhall L Model Wyvern in late 1948; and became the PC. 1952 saw the launch of the Bedford CA light commercial, signifying the end of the road for the outmoded HC and JC models. The CA was a range of vans and pick-ups similar in concept and size to (although pre-dating) the Ford Transit of 1965. These were semi-forward control, having a short bonnet with the rear of the engine protruding into the cab. Engines were the Vauxhall-based 1,508 cubic centimetres (92.0 cu in) OHV in-line four petrol engine, with the option of a Perkins 4/99 or 4/108 diesel engine later on. Performance was adequate for the time, a maximum speed of 60 miles per hour (97 km/h) being attainable with the petrol engine, and offering fuel economy of 25 miles per imperial gallon (11 L/100 km; 21 mpg_{‑US}). The van initially featured a three-speed column gearchange, changing later on to a four-speed column change.

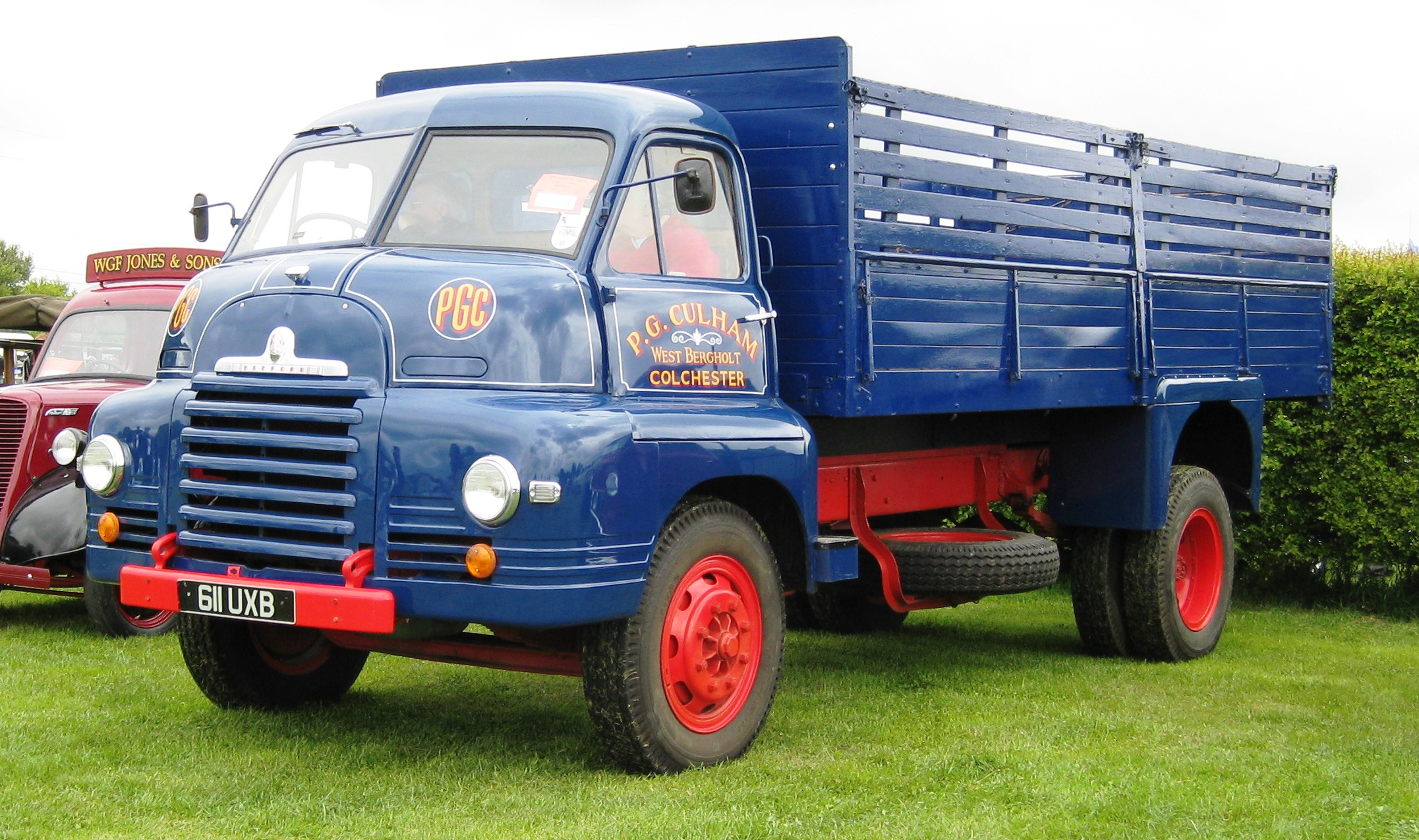
Bedford S

The CA was a huge seller both at home and in various overseas markets. The standard panel van was available in short- and long-wheelbase forms, and was also sold as chassis cab / chassis cowl, and became a popular basis for ice-cream vans, ambulances and camper vans. Known affectionately as "the Tilley", the CA enjoyed a very long production span, with only minor tweaks throughout its life, including the replacement of the two piece windscreen of earlier models with a single sheet. Production ended in 1969.

The CA was replaced by the CF, a highly redesigned vehicle, albeit architecturally similar, but rather larger, using new overhead camshaft (OHC) engines, which was to have a much harder time proving itself thanks to the Ford Transit.

Perhaps the major event of the 1950s was the transfer of all non-car based commercial vehicle manufacture to the former Vauxhall shadow factory at Boscombe Road, Dunstable. Bedford Dunstable plant, dating originally from 1942, was extensively rebuilt and extended between 1955 and 1957, when all production lines were said to be over a mile long. Subsequently, all commercial vehicle manufacture would be concentrated there, with only vans and car-based commercials remaining at the Luton plant. Production of the Bedford commercial vehicle range remained there until production ceased in the 1980s.

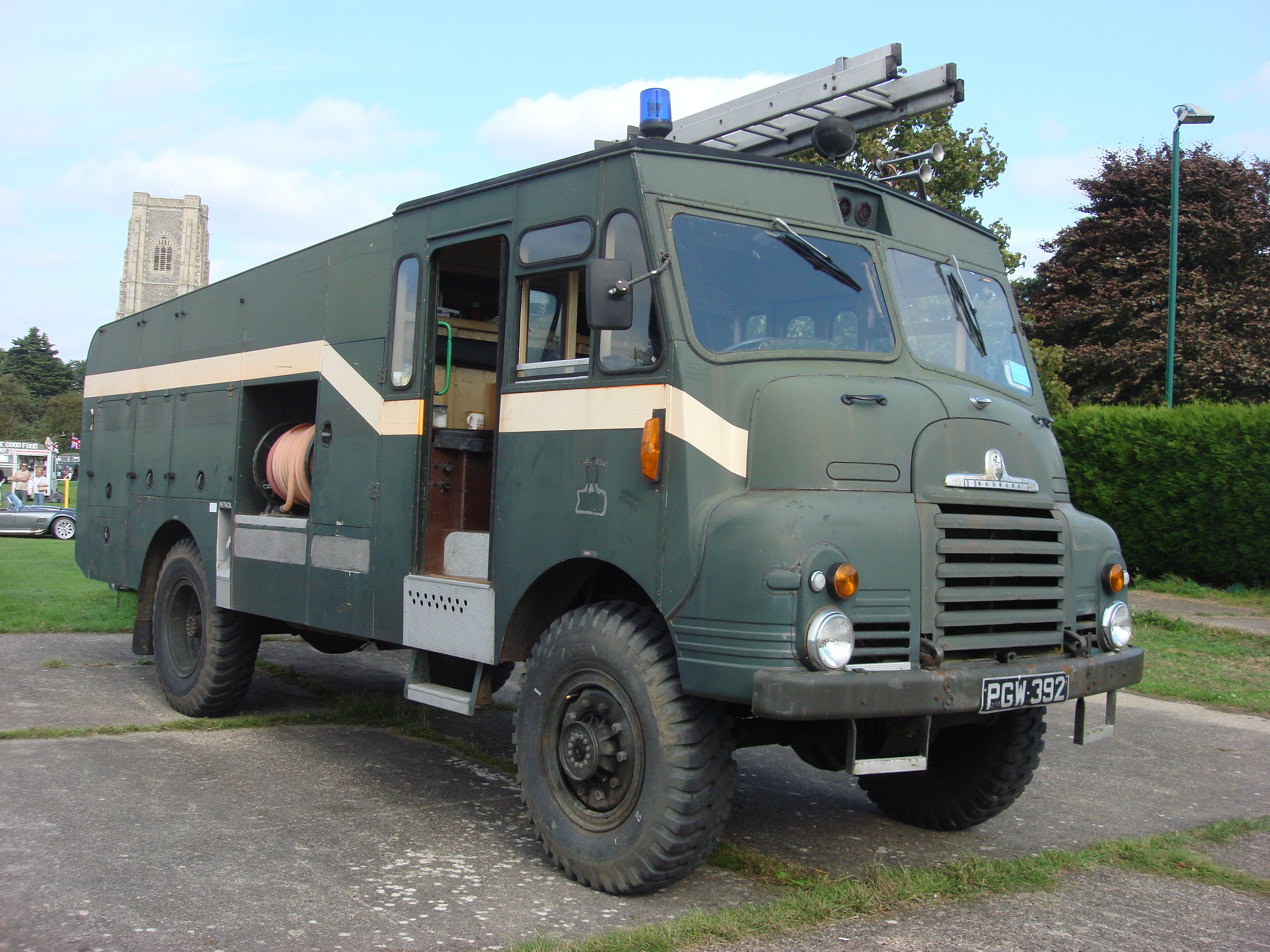
Green Goddess fire engine

The 1950s also saw the launch of the popular S type trucks, the so-called Big Bedfords, which brought Bedford into the 7-ton range. The S series was immortalised in RL form – a four-wheel drive, high ground clearance version, as the Green Goddess emergency fire tender, used by the Auxiliary Fire Service until 1968, then until 2004 over 1,000 were held in reserve by the Home Office for use in the event of fire-service industrial action or other serious emergencies. They were disposed of by the Home Office in 2005. Several have found new homes in African countries that lack a developed fire-fighting service, such as Kenya. The C series of 1957 was a forward-control derivative of the S series, and outwardly very similar to it.

These vehicles were available in rigid and tractor units, with either petrol or diesel engines. The UK military were a huge customer for Bedford RLs using a 4.9-litre straight six petrol engine. Many RLs found their way into the armed forces of Commonwealth countries and later into civilian use.

Alongside the S series trucks, the SB bus was released in 1950, and immediately became a big seller in India, Pakistan, Australia, New Zealand and Africa, as well as in the UK. The SB chassis was also used as a basis for specialised vehicles, such as mobile libraries, fire engines, and civil defence control units. The largest fleet of SB buses in the world belonged to New Zealand Railways Road Services, with 1,280 SB buses built between 1954 and 1981.

The Bedford TK range replaced the S type in 1959, but the RL continued in production until 1969, when it was replaced by the M type, which used the basic cab of the TK and the mechanicals of the RL with minimal changes.

The pre-war K, M and O types continued in production alongside the heavier S types until 1953. Vauxhall had already gone for a transatlantic styling with its E Model Wyvern and Velox saloons, and Bedford followed suit with its mid-range of trucks in 1953. Designated as the TA series, the new range were mechanically very similar to their predecessors, but featured a new Chevrolet-inspired cab. The 'T' designation meant "truck", so the range is generally referred to as the A series. Numbers 2, 3, 4 and 5; as in A2, etc., identified the weight rating. A factory-fitted Perkins diesel engine was an option. The TA (A) series was updated in 1957, and became the TJ, or J series.

The Bedford TJ normal control light truck was introduced in 1958, available with either petrol or diesel engines. Although never a big seller in the home market (with the exception of Post Office Telephones), it was a big export earner in developing countries, due to its basic layout and specification, and remained in production (for export markets only) until production of Bedford vehicles ceased.

=== 1960s and 1970s ===
The Bedford TK range was produced in large numbers since 1959, and served as the basis for a variety of derivatives including fire engines, military vehicles, horse-boxes, tippers, flat-bed trucks, and other specialist utility vehicles. A Post Office Telephones version used for installing telegraph poles was known as the Pole Erection Unit. The British Armed Forces still use four-wheel drive Bedford MKs – a variant of the TK.

Available with four and six-cylinder petrol and diesel engines, the TK was the quintessential light truck in the UK through most of the 1960s and 1970s, competing with the similar Ford D series. It was available in rigid form, and as a light tractor unit, normally using the Scammell coupling form of trailer attachment.

The Bedford KM was a similar vehicle, using the same cab, but with a slightly restyled front end, and was marketed for heavier-duty applications than the TK, i.e. 16 tons and over. Many developing countries still use ageing Bedfords every day, their robust nature and simple engineering endearing them as highly useful vehicles in demanding terrain.

From 1961 to 1968, General Motors Argentina manufactured Bedford trucks and truck-based buses in a plant at San Martín, Buenos Aires.

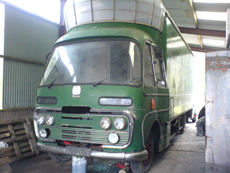
1967 Bedford SB mobile cinema

In 1967, a Bedford SB3 chassis with Plaxton's Panorama cab was used in the construction of seven custom mobile cinema units that toured British factories for the Ministry of Technology to "raise standards". The body was custom fabricated from extruded aluminium by Coventry Steel Caravans. One of these restored units is used as a vintage mobile cinema. The vehicle dubbed The Reel History Bus was used in the BBC Two television series, Reel History of Britain showing little known or totally unseen archive film of historical events, to the surviving participants and their families on board. They showed their reaction and interviewed audience members about their often newly jogged memories of events. The Vintage Mobile Cinema has appeared on The One Show and George Clarke's Small Spaces, and continues to appear around the UK.

The smaller Bedford CF was less successful, competing directly with the market-dominating Ford Transit, although used by many of Britain's major utility companies, including British Telecom and British Gas plc. However, the CF was much less popular with fleet operators than the Transit, which was more popular with its drivers and seen as cheaper to operate and maintain. Part of the reason for the CF's relative unpopularity was the use of the slant 4 SOHC petrol engine from the FD and FE Vauxhall Victor – which was notoriously rough running, had high fuel consumption, and was susceptible to cam belt breakage. However, the CF became very popular as a base of special-bodied ice cream vans and mobile shops. The later CF2 used the more reliable Opel Ascona engine.

In Australia, the GM subsidiary of Holden began assembling the CF series with in-line six-cylinder engines borrowed from their passenger car range, in competition against Ford Australia's version of the Transit van which had been re-engineered to accommodate in-line six-cylinder engines from the local Ford Falcon.

Bedford's smallest products, car-derived vans, were the Bedford HA van, which substantially outlived the Vauxhall Viva HA on which it was based, and the Bedford Chevanne, a short-lived variant of the Vauxhall Chevette. An estate conversion of the HA van by Martin Walter was marketed as the Bedford Beagle. This was further developed into a camper van, the Roma, again by Martin Walter.

The company also made a number of bus chassis, its low price catering for the cheaper end of the coach market.

During the 1970s, the Bedford HA derived BTV (Basic Transport Vehicle) was produced in many countries and sold under different names such as "Compadre" (Honduras), "Chato" (Guatemala), "Cherito" (El Salvador), "Amigo" (Costa Rica), and "Pinolero" (Nicaragua).

=== 1980s ===
The TK/KM/MK range remained the mainstay of production throughout the 1960s and 1970s, but with little serious product investment the range became increasingly outdated. In 1982, the TL range was introduced almost completely replacing the TK, although its military equivalents continued in production for the UK Ministry of Defence. In reality a long overdue update of the TK, the TL was never as popular as the model range it succeeded. This was largely due to more modern products offered by other companies (increasingly from the likes of Volvo, MAN and Mercedes-Benz).

The Bedford TM was the largest of all the modern Bedfords, with payloads available up to 42 tonnes GTW permissible. The TM was available with either GM or Detroit Diesel engines and enjoyed a small but loyal customer base, but could never compete with the volume producers, primarily Volvo and Scania, even in its home market. Turkey's Genoto assembled Bedfords under license.

A major blow came when Bedford failed to win a UK Ministry of Defence contract to produce the standard 4–ton 4x4 GS (general service) truck for the British forces – although in extensive tests the Bedford candidate had been the equal of the Leyland (later Leyland DAF) candidate, and the British Army expressed a preference to continue the trusted relationship with Bedford trucks. The reasons for this decision were seen by many as political, as the Army 4–tonner contract was seen by the Thatcher government as essential for the long-term survival of Leyland, and for the formation of Leyland DAF. The implications of the decision were also noted by GM in Detroit, who had already been refused permission to buy the Land Rover division of British Leyland, which they had intended to operate in tandem with the Bedford Truck division as a major force in the military and civilian off-roader market.

In addition to this setback, by the middle of the decade, the more technologically advanced competition from other truck manufacturers was eating heavily into sales. In reality, the Bedford truck range, still largely based on the 1960 TK range, had become increasingly outdated when compared with the opposition, leading to a deep decline in non-military sales. It was therefore announced by GM that Bedford would stop production of all commercial vehicles, and the Dunstable plant would close in 1986.

From there on in, the Bedford name continued as badge engineering on smaller light commercials only. The HA compact van finally ceased production in 1983, having been kept in production largely due to continuing large orders from British utility companies such as British Rail and the GPO. It was replaced by the Vauxhall Astra-based "Astravan" and the later high-roof "Astramax" variant which were later rebranded as Vauxhalls. The CF van was facelifted in 1982 and was given Opel engines and continued until 1986. In 1985, the IBC Vehicles venture was founded which spawned the Suzuki Carry based Bedford Rascal microvan and Isuzu Fargo based Bedford Midi van range – later to be called the Vauxhall Midi.

=== Isuzu and IBC ===
Bedford's first partnership with Isuzu came in 1976 when it marketed a rebadged version of the Isuzu Faster pickup truck as the Bedford KB. The vehicle was never a strong seller in Britain, (subsequent generations were badged as the Bedford/Vauxhall Brava), but it did pave the way for further collaboration – culminating in the IBC venture.

In 1986, the Bedford van factory in Luton was reorganised as a joint venture with Isuzu. The resulting company, IBC Vehicles, produced a locally built version of the Isuzu Fargo in 1985 (badged as the Bedford Midi).

In 1991, this was followed by a European version of the Isuzu MU Wizard called the Frontera, and a rebadged Renault Trafic van called the Arena, sold under the Vauxhall and Opel brand names. The Bedford name was dropped completely, as were all of its preceding range apart from the Midi, which was sold for a few years as the Bedford Seta (in Portugal).

In 1998, GM bought Isuzu out of the IBC partnership. The plant now operates as GMM Luton, and at first built the Renault Trafic which was badge engineered as a Vivaro under the Vauxhall and Opel marques, currently it builds a licensed version of the Citroën Jumpy.

=== David John Bowes Brown and AWD ===
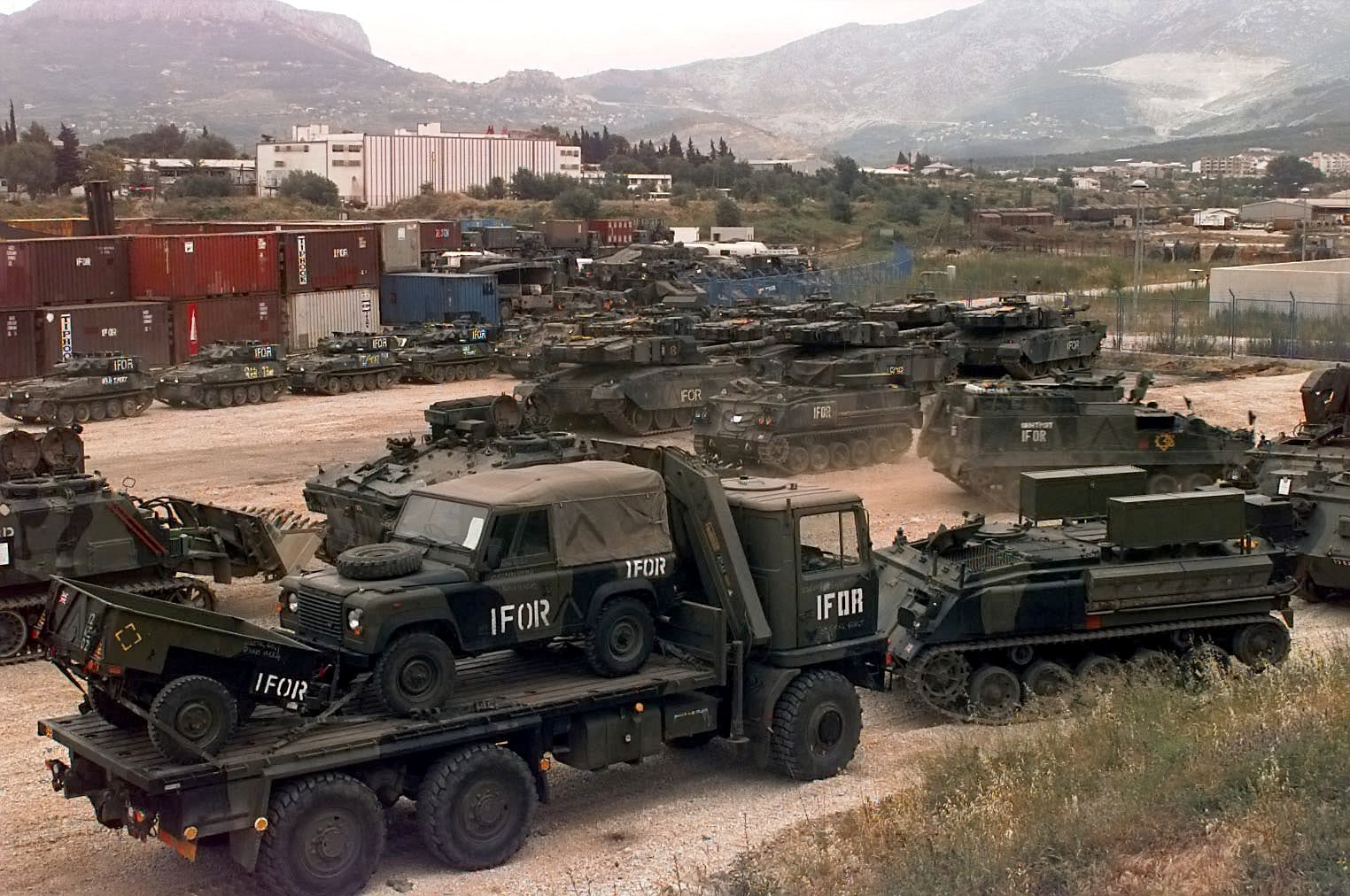
AWD Bedford TM 6-6 (6x6) 14000 kg Truck

The Bedford trucks site in Dunstable and business was sold in 1987 to AWD Trucks, a company owned by David John Bowes Brown. The AWD name was used as GM would only allow the use of the Bedford name for military trucks. David John Bowes Brown was the designer in 1973 of the then DJB D250 Articulated Dump Truck, built in Peterlee, England, by DJB Engineering. DJB was renamed Artix in 1985 when the trucks were rebadged as Caterpillar. Artix itself was sold to Caterpillar in 1996.

AWD continued with the TL and TM range, and was still producing the TJ series for export. The AWD Bedford TK (a rebadged and modernised version of the Bedford TK / MK range) was also produced and supplied to the British military. Due to cheaper competition and the virtual collapse of the UK market in which AWD competed in 1989/90, the company went into receivership in 1992 and was bought by dealer network Marshall of Cambridge. The name was finally retired in 1998, becoming Marshall Special Vehicles, producer of various military vehicles.

== Logo ==
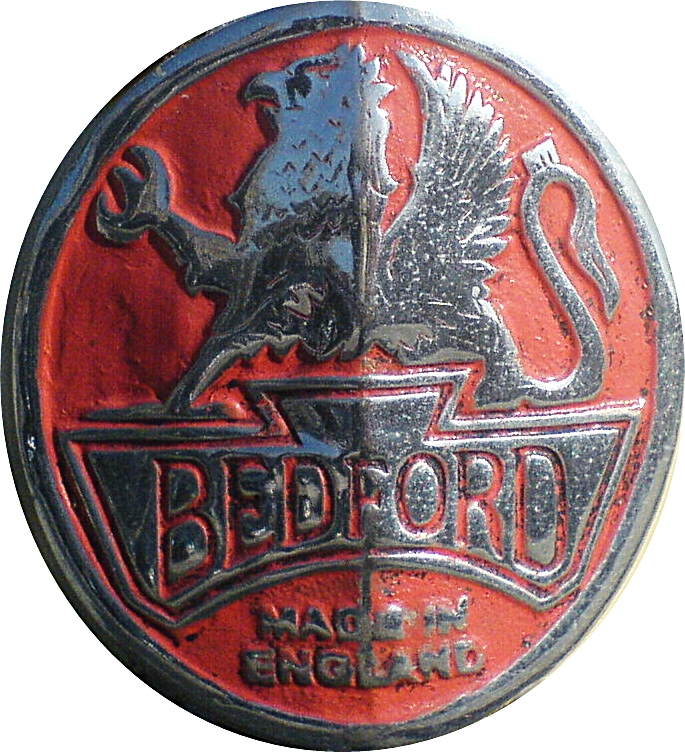
An older version of the Bedford badge with Griffin logo

Bedford used the Griffin logo of Vauxhall Motors, derived from the heraldic crest of Falkes de Breauté, who was granted the Manor of Luton by King John. By marriage, he acquired property in London, known as Fulk's Hall, which over time, came to be the locality of Vauxhall, the original home of Vauxhall Motors. The griffin returned to Luton in 1903 when Vauxhall Motors moved there. The Bedford version of the logo differed from the Vauxhall version in that the Griffin did not hold a flag – although later versions of the logo showed the Griffin holding a flag carrying a letter "B" (for Bedford) instead of a "V".

== Products ==
List of products produced at Bedford / IBC Vehicles Luton:

=== Bedford models ===
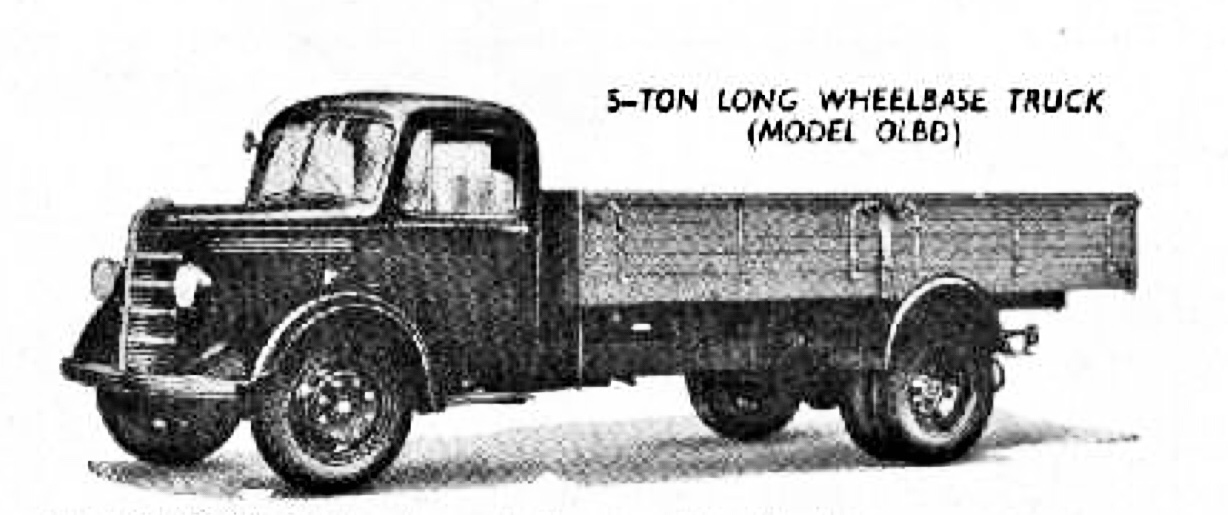
Bedford OLBD 5t (1948)

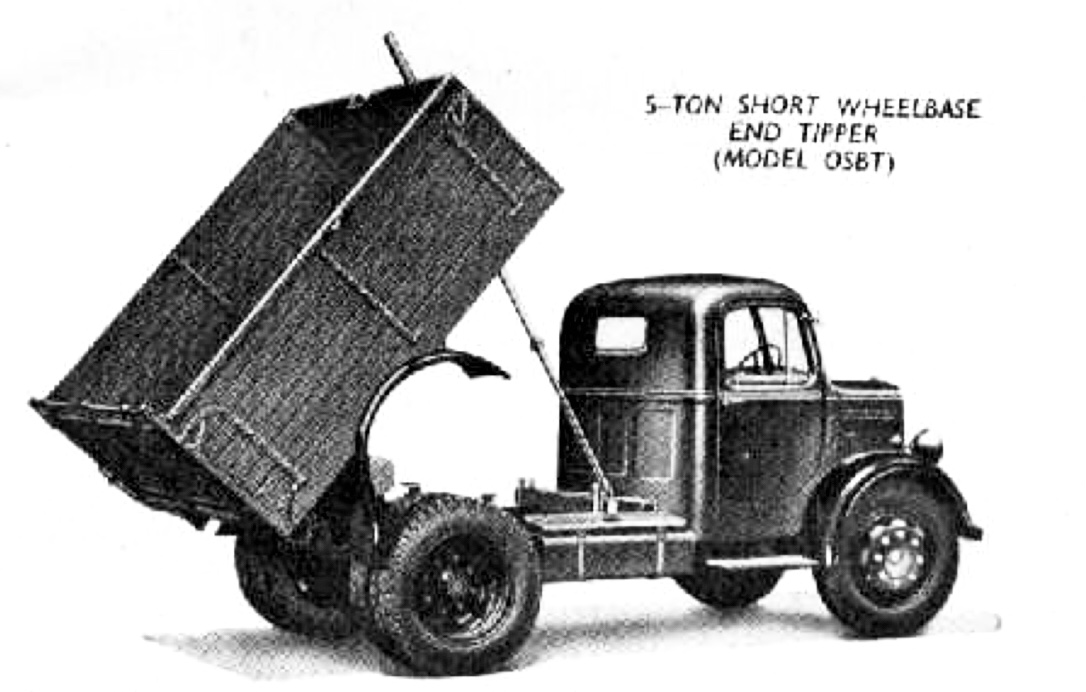
Bedford OSBT 5t (1948)

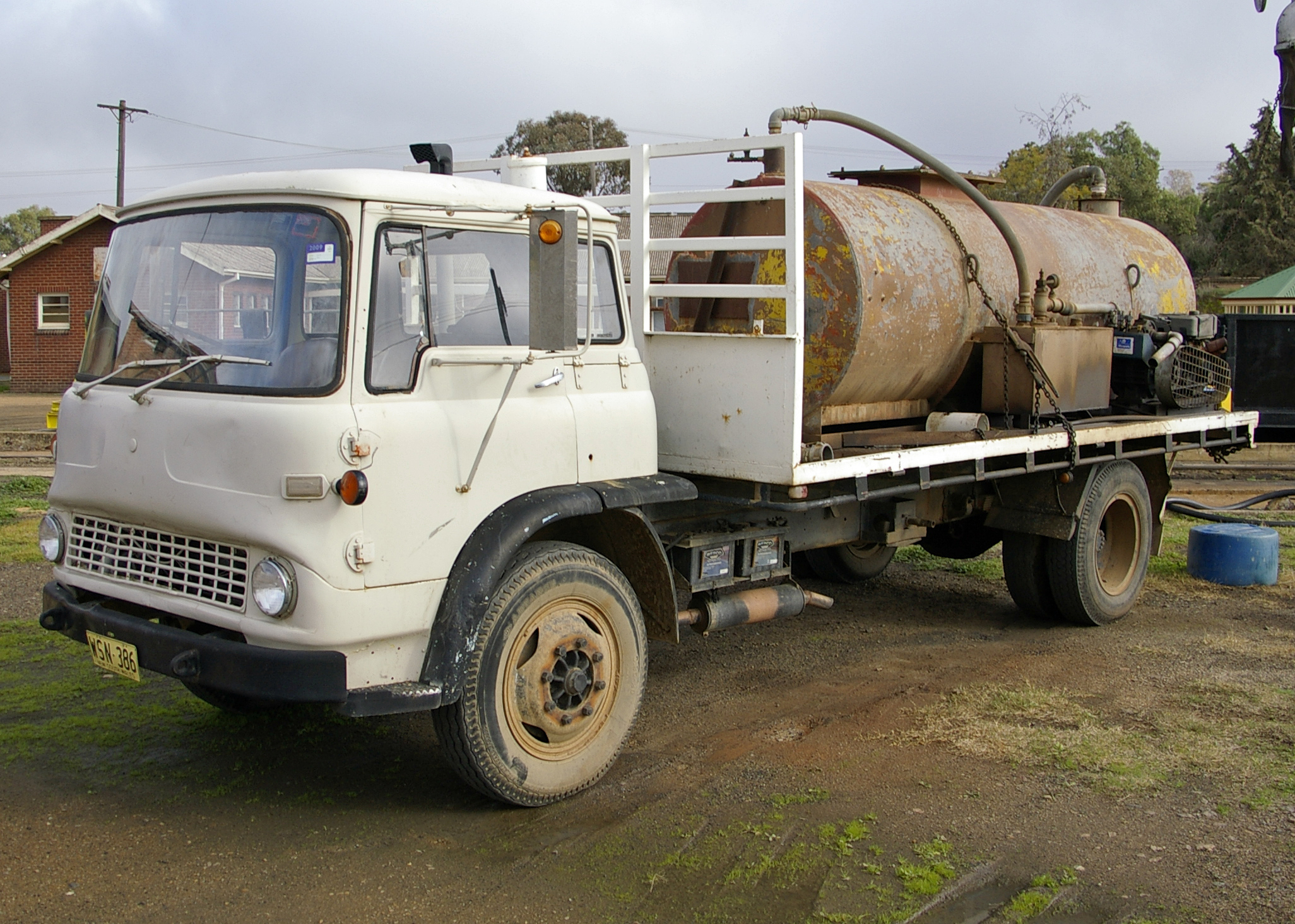
Bedford TK

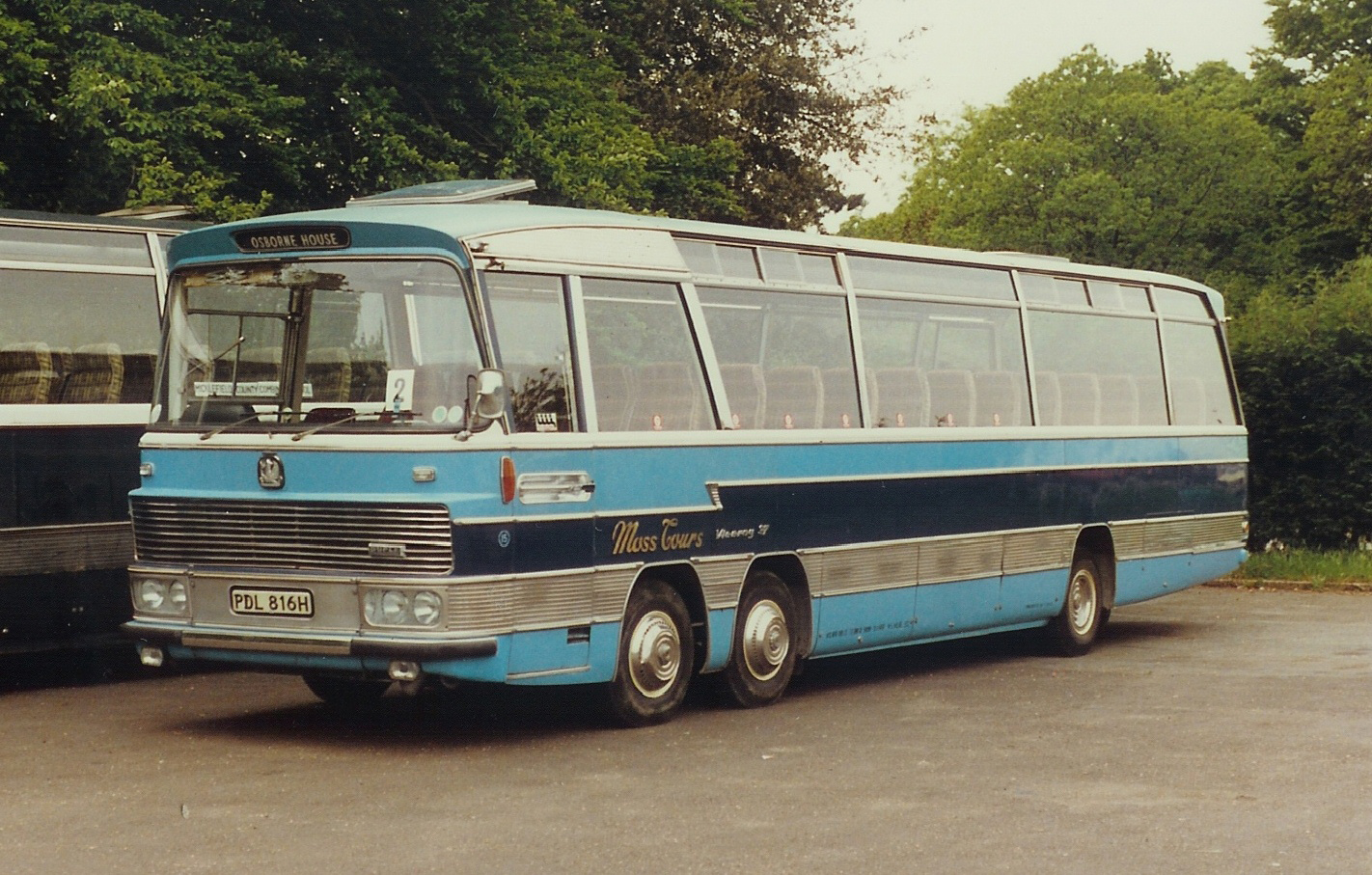
Bedford VAL

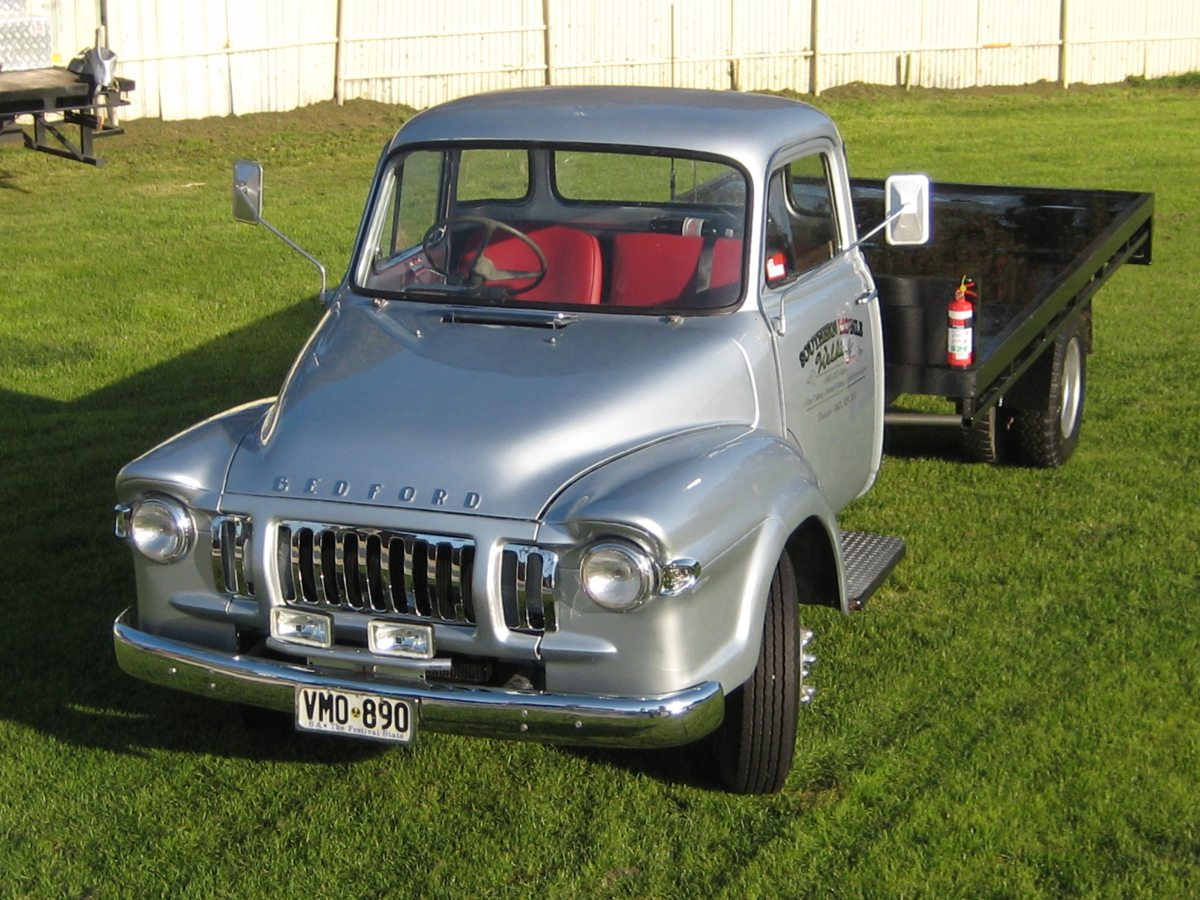
Bedford TJ J3

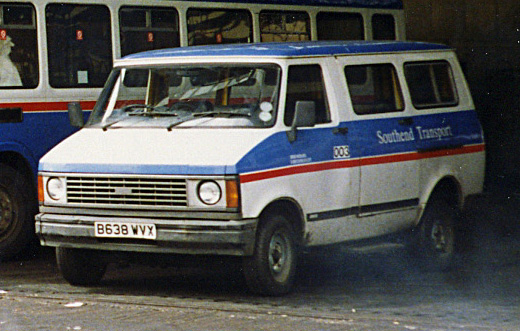
1985 CF series 2

Very approximately in size order

- Rascal
- HA (Note: based on Vauxhall Viva)
- Beagle (Note: estate version of HA; see Vauxhall Viva, above)
- Chevanne (Note: based on Vauxhall Chevette)
- Astra (Note: based on Vauxhall Astra Mk 1 then Mk2 estate)
- Astramax (Note: high-cube version of Mk2 Astra shape)
- Midi
- Brava
- CA
- CF (Note: and Opel Bedford Blitz)
- Dormobile
- MW
- W series
- K series
- M series
- O series
  - Range includes OSA, OSB, OLA, OLB, OSS, OB
- A series
- D series
- QL
- S series
- ML (Note: lorry and bus)
- OB (Note: bus)
- JJL
- SB
- VAS
- RL
- TK
- TJ (Note: J0 (often referred to as JO) and J1-J6)
- TL
- RK
- MK
- MJ
- KM
- VAL
- VAM
- Y series (Note: buses, vertical mid-engine)
  - Eight metres
    - YMP/S
  - Ten metres
    - YRQ
    - YLQ
    - YMQ
    - YMP
  - Eleven metres
    - YRT
    - YMT
    - YNT
  - Twelve metres
    - YNV Venturer
- TM
  - TM 4x4

=== Vauxhall models ===
(some also sold as Opels and other GM brands)

- Vauxhall Midi (a rebadged Isuzu Fargo)
- Vauxhall Astravan (a rebadged Opel Kadett/Astra van
- Vauxhall Astramax (a rebadged Opel Kadett Combo)
- Vauxhall Brava (a rebadged Isuzu Faster)
- Vauxhall Rascal (a rebadged Suzuki Carry)
- Vauxhall Frontera (a rebadged Isuzu MU 4x4 SUV)
- Vauxhall Vivaro (a rebadged variant of the Renault Trafic)

=== Renault models ===
- Renault Trafic (platform-sharing version of Nissan Primastar, Opel Vivaro and Vauxhall Vivaro)

== Bedford bus sales totals 1931–1966 ==
Model	Wheelbase	Normal seating	Introduced	Completed	Home sales	Export sales	total
WHB	10 ft. 11in.	14	7/31	5/33	94	8	102
WLB	13 ft. 1in.	20	7/31	9/35	1431	464	1,895
WTB	13 ft. 11in.	26	1/35	7/39	2,556	664	3,220
OB	14 ft. 6in.	26	8/39	10/39	52	21	73
OWB	14 ft. 6in.	32	1/42	9/45	3,189	209	3,398
OB	14 ft. 6in.	29	10/45	11/50	7,200	5,493	12,693
SB	17 ft. 2in./18 ft.	33/41	10/50		14,050	14,727	28,777*
VAS	13 ft. 8in.	29/30	8/61		698	454	1,152*
VAL	17 ft. 8in.	49/52	8/62		776	128	904*
VAM	16 ft. 1in.	45	8/65				

- The SB, VAS, VAL and VAM sales figures are to June 1965. Later production is not included in these figures.

== Gallery ==
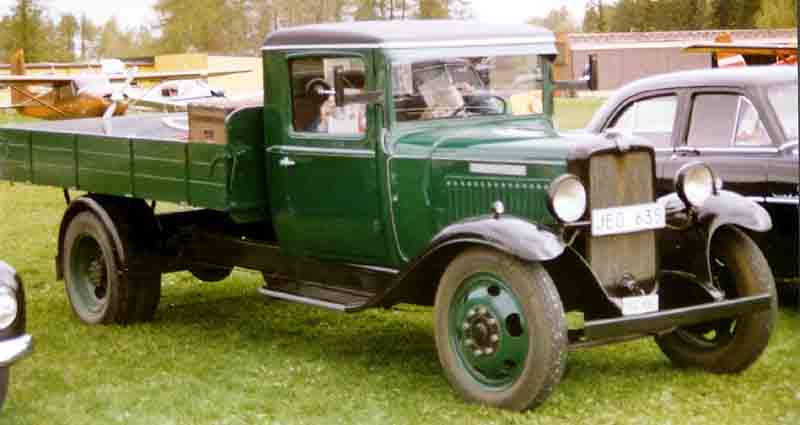
Bedford Six WLG 2.5-ton truck 1932

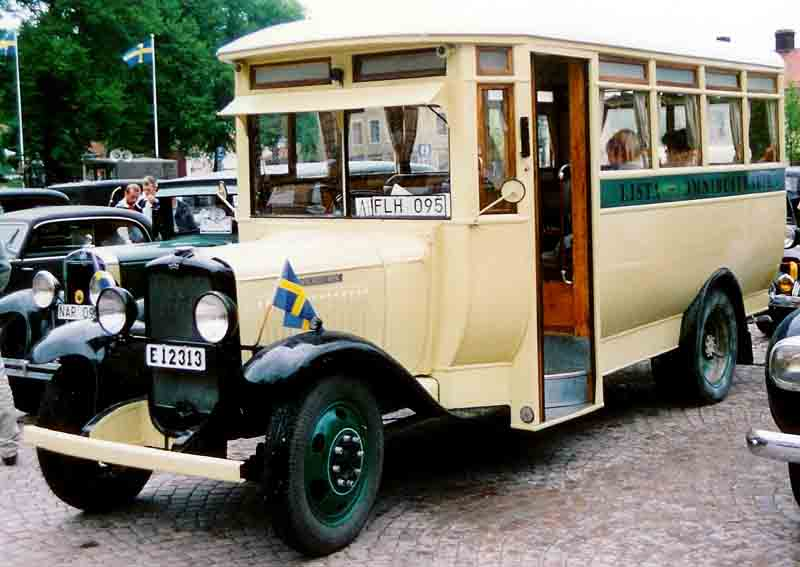
Bedford WLB bus 1932

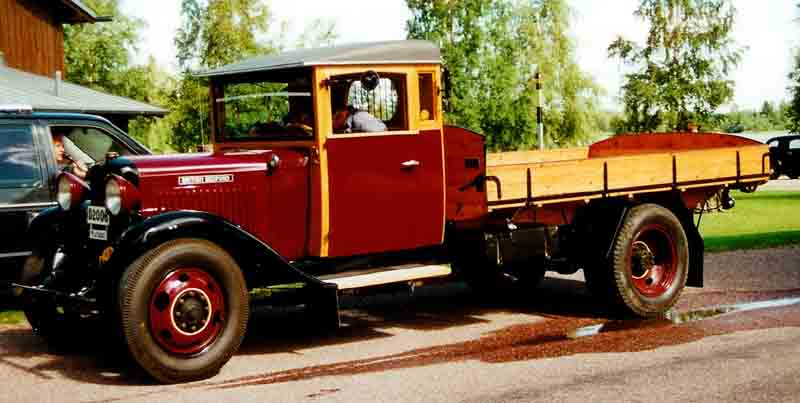
Bedford WLG truck 1933

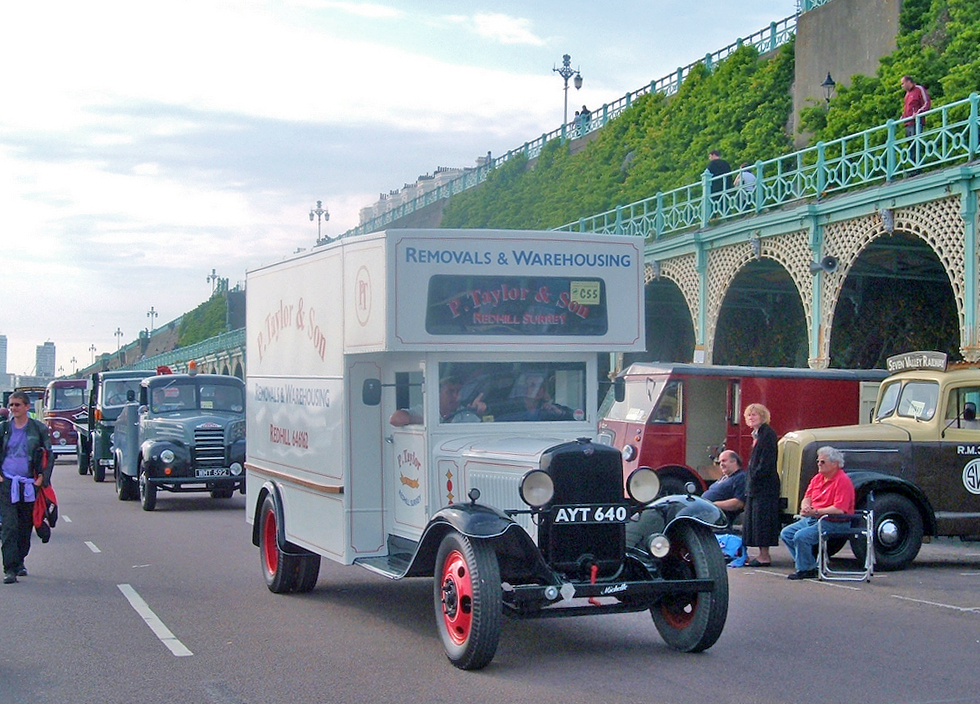
1933 Bedford two-ton Luton van

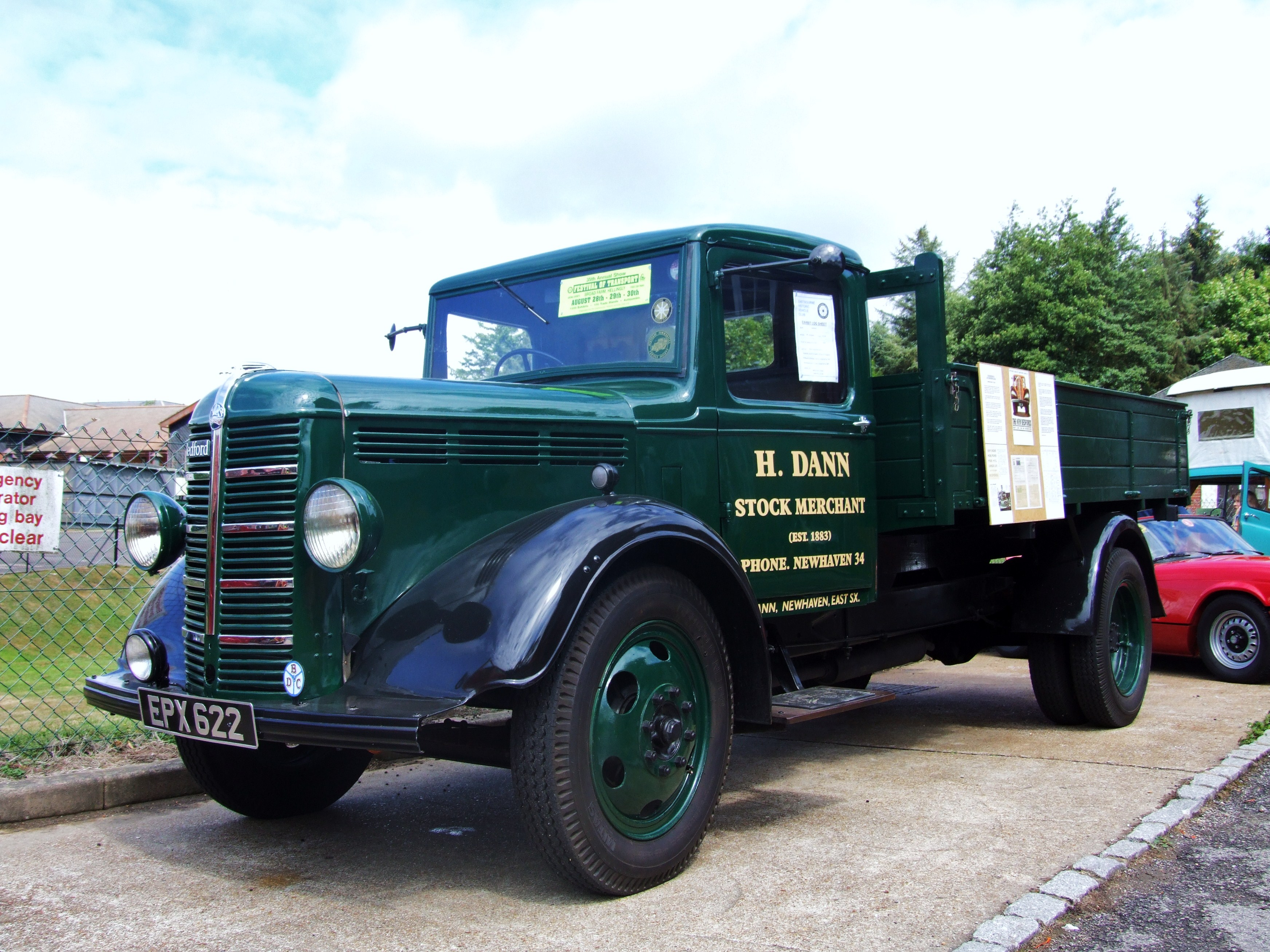
Restored lorry

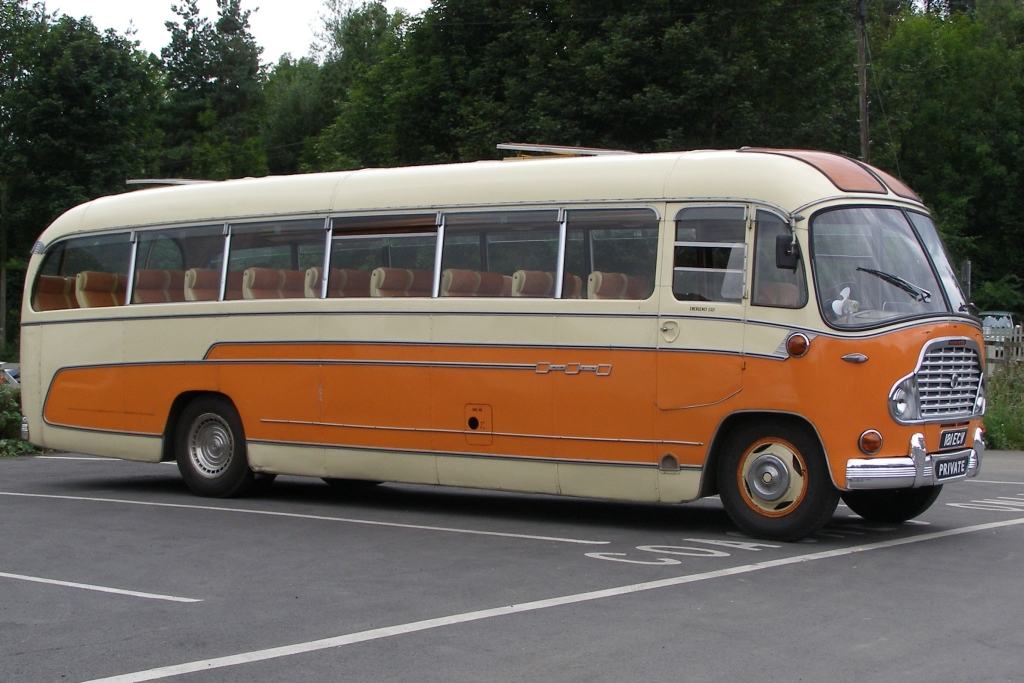
1959 Bedford SB with Duple body

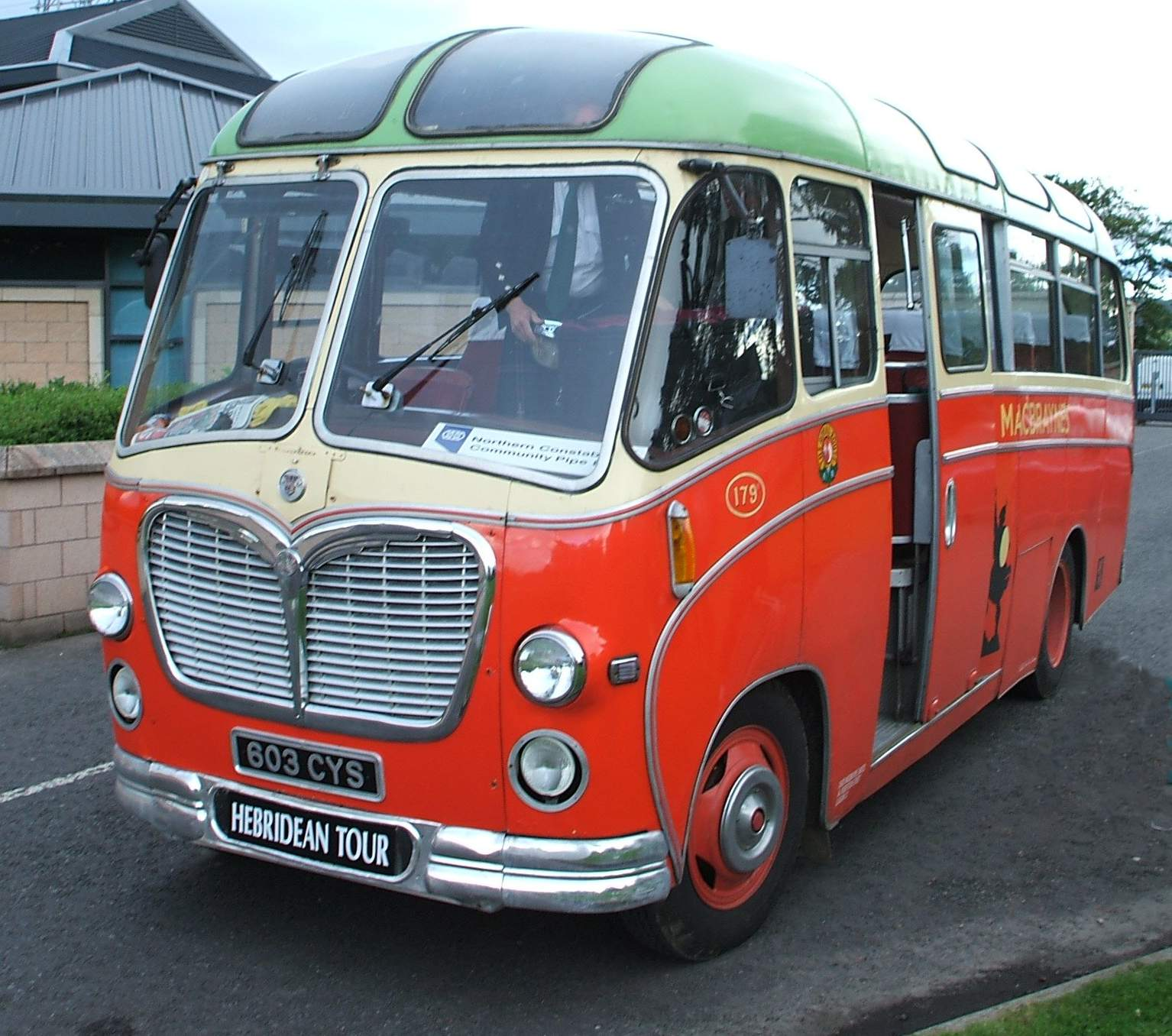
1961 Bedford C with Duple body

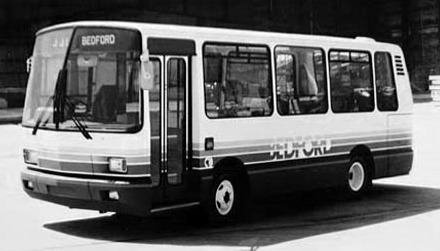
Rare Bedford JJL early midibus

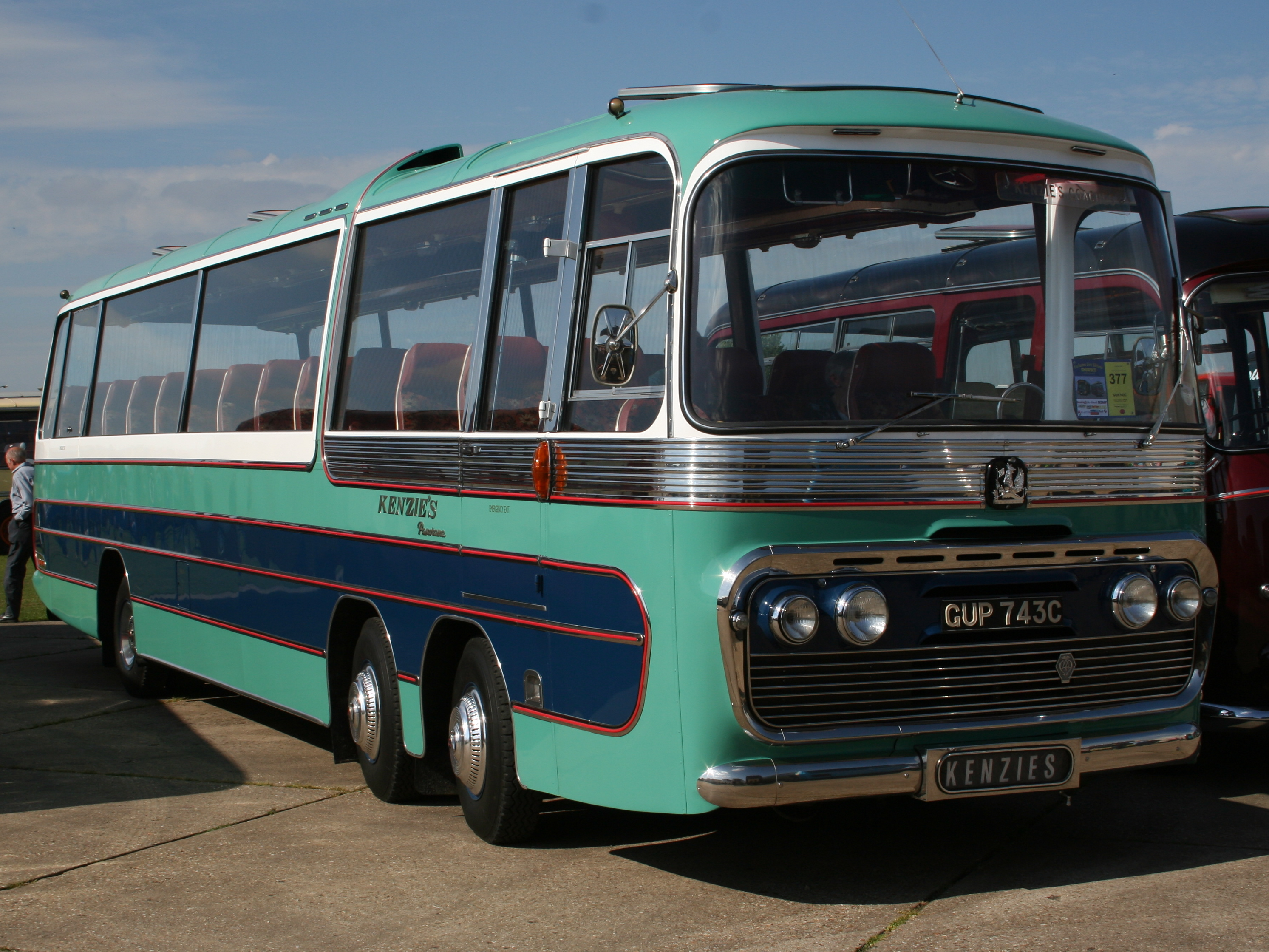
Bedford VAL twin steer coach

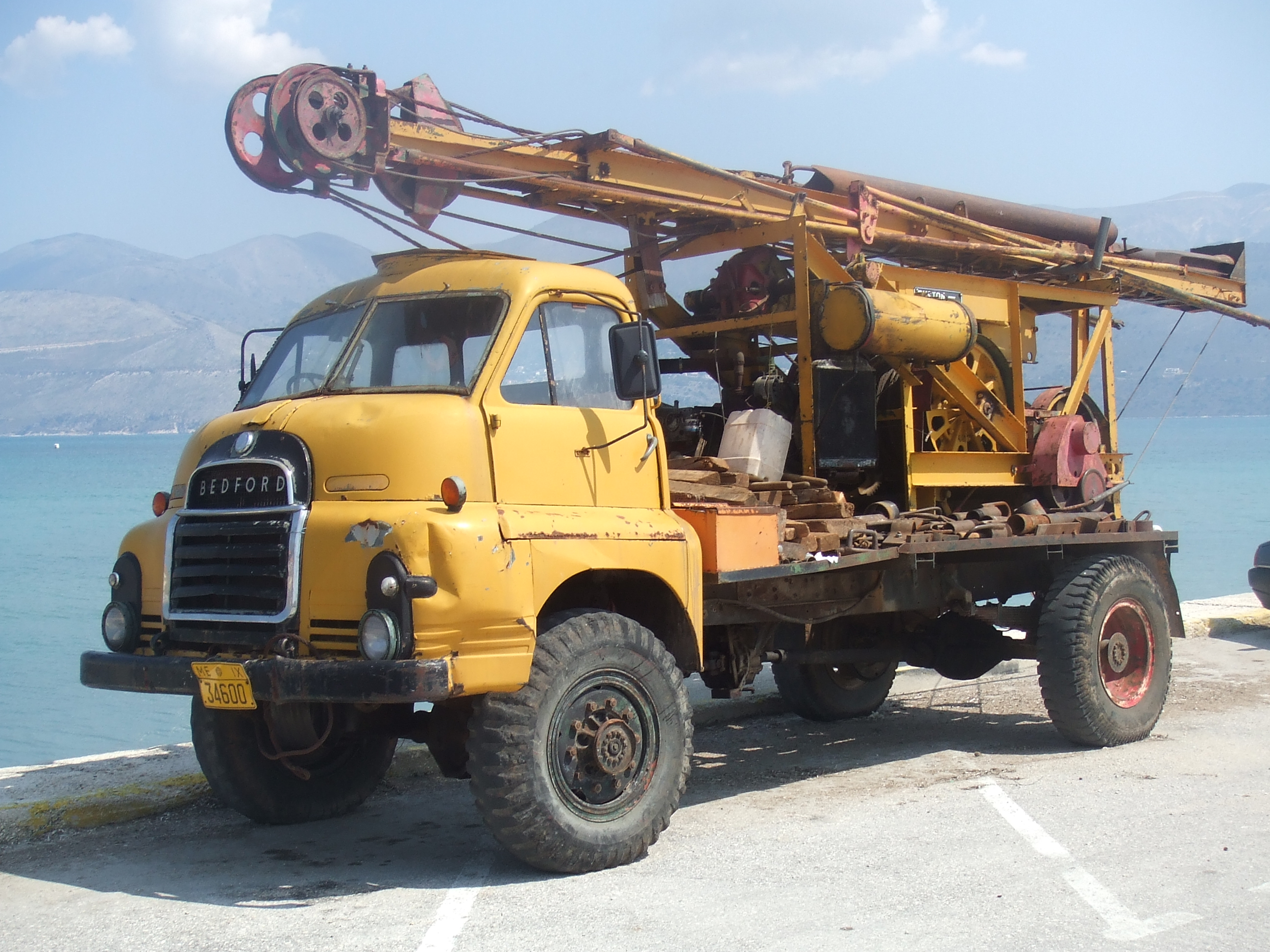
Bedford 4WD chassis cab with a chassis mounted drilling rig by Ruston-Bucyrus

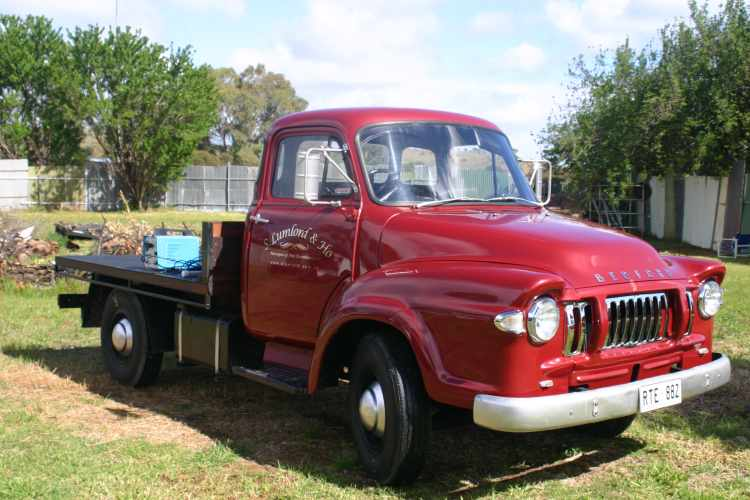
1967 Bedford TJ J1

Bedford fire engine, County Carlow, Ireland

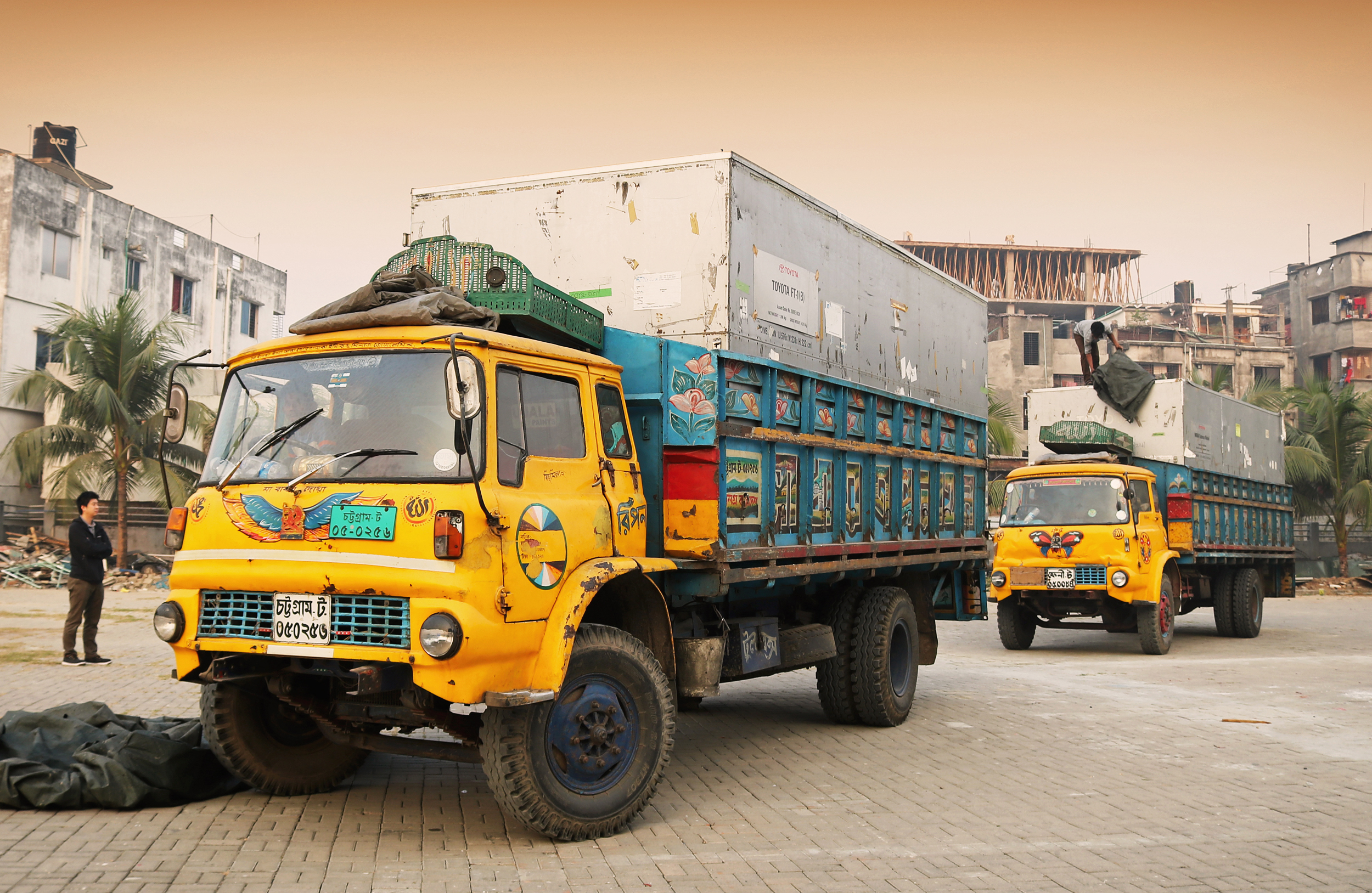
Bedford TK trucks in Bangladesh.

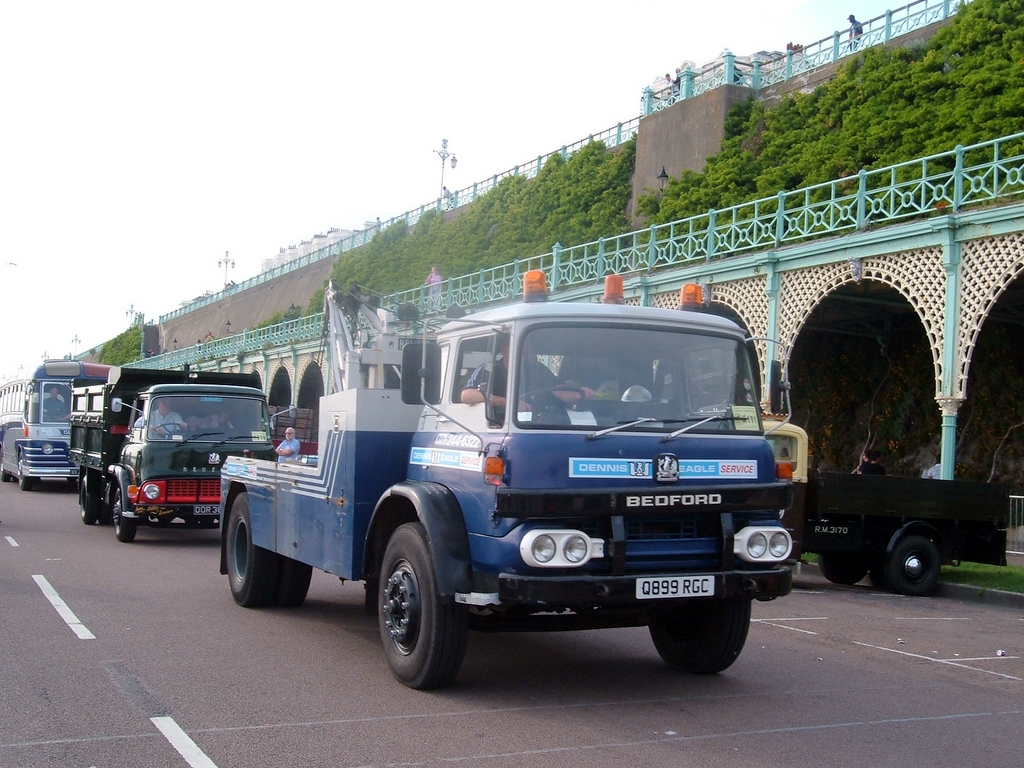
1974 Bedford KM recovery truck

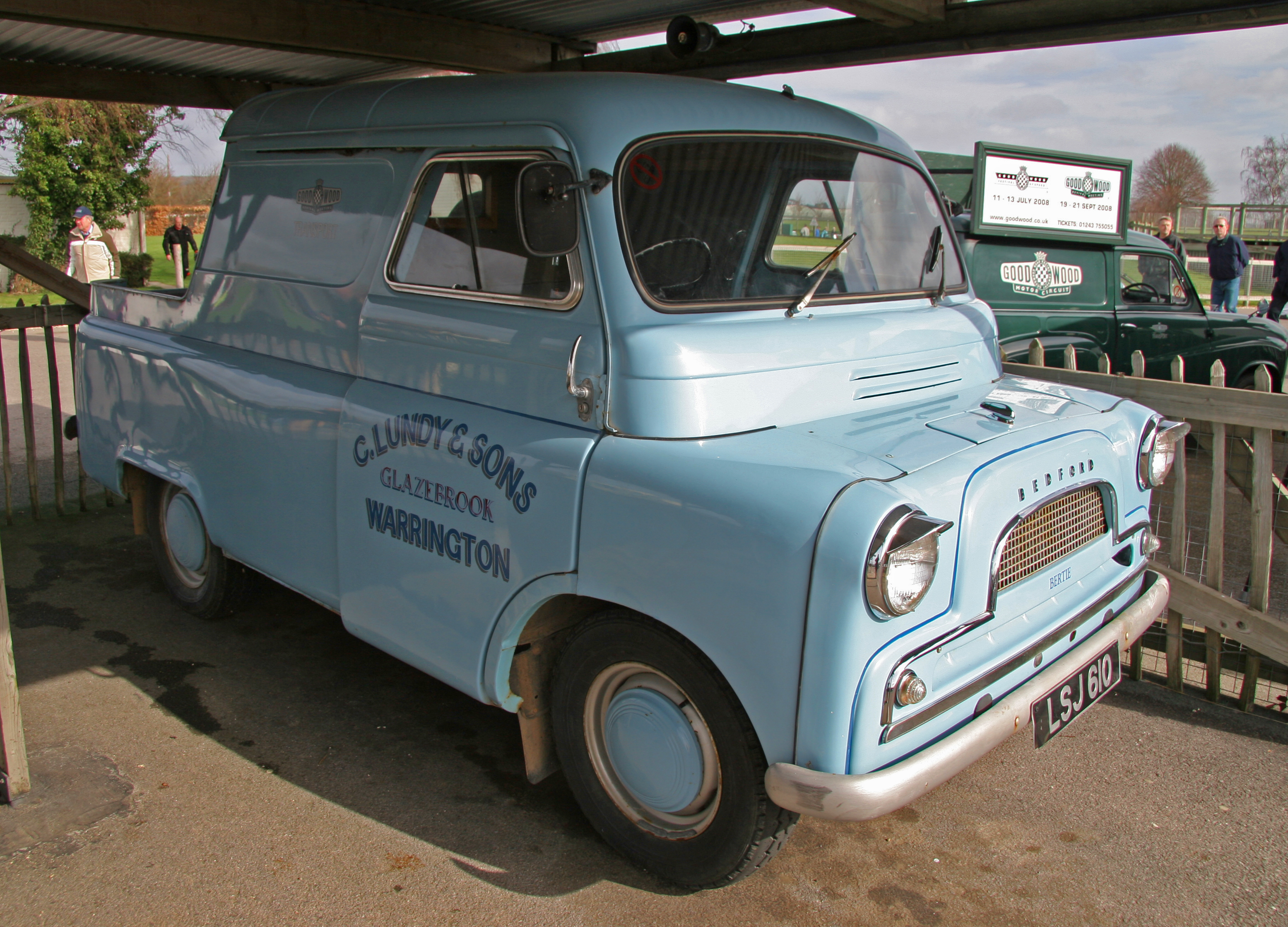
Bedford CA

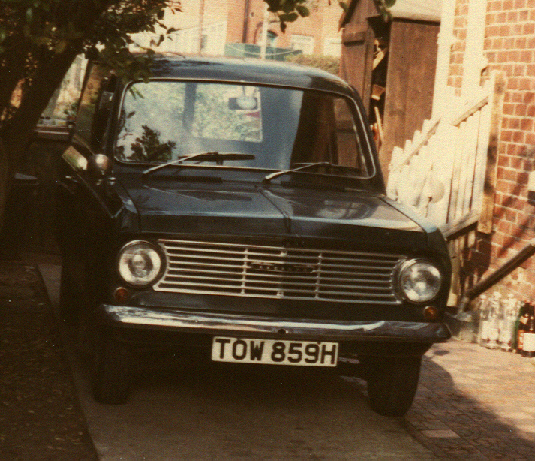
1970 Bedford HA van

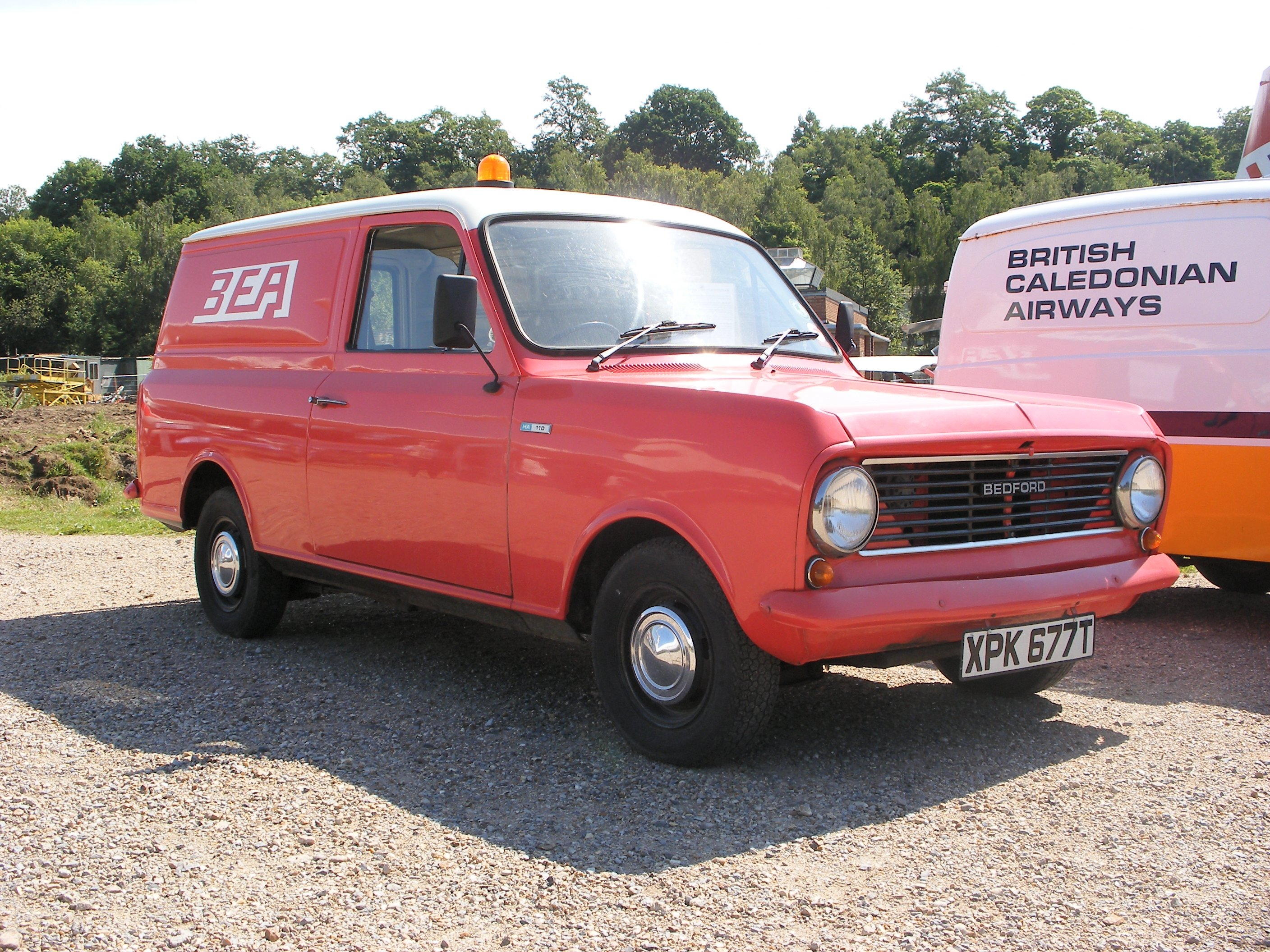
1978 Bedford HA van in BEA livery at Brooklands Museum, Weybridge

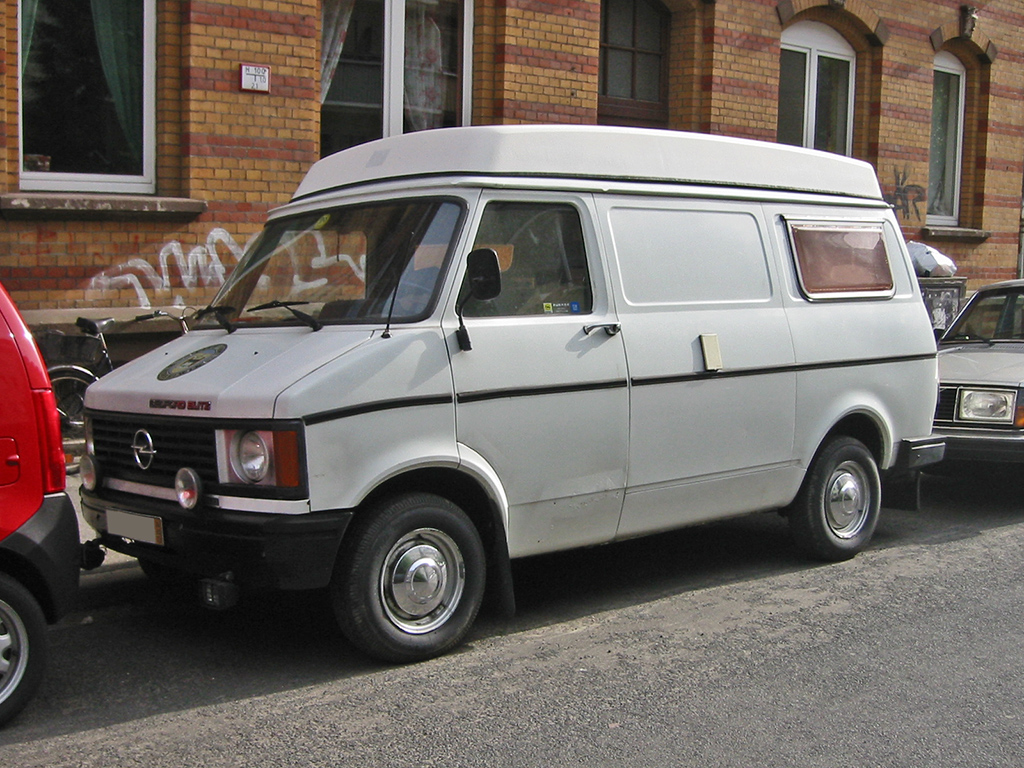
Bedford Blitz (German market name) / Bedford CF (UK designation)
