= Bedford VAS =

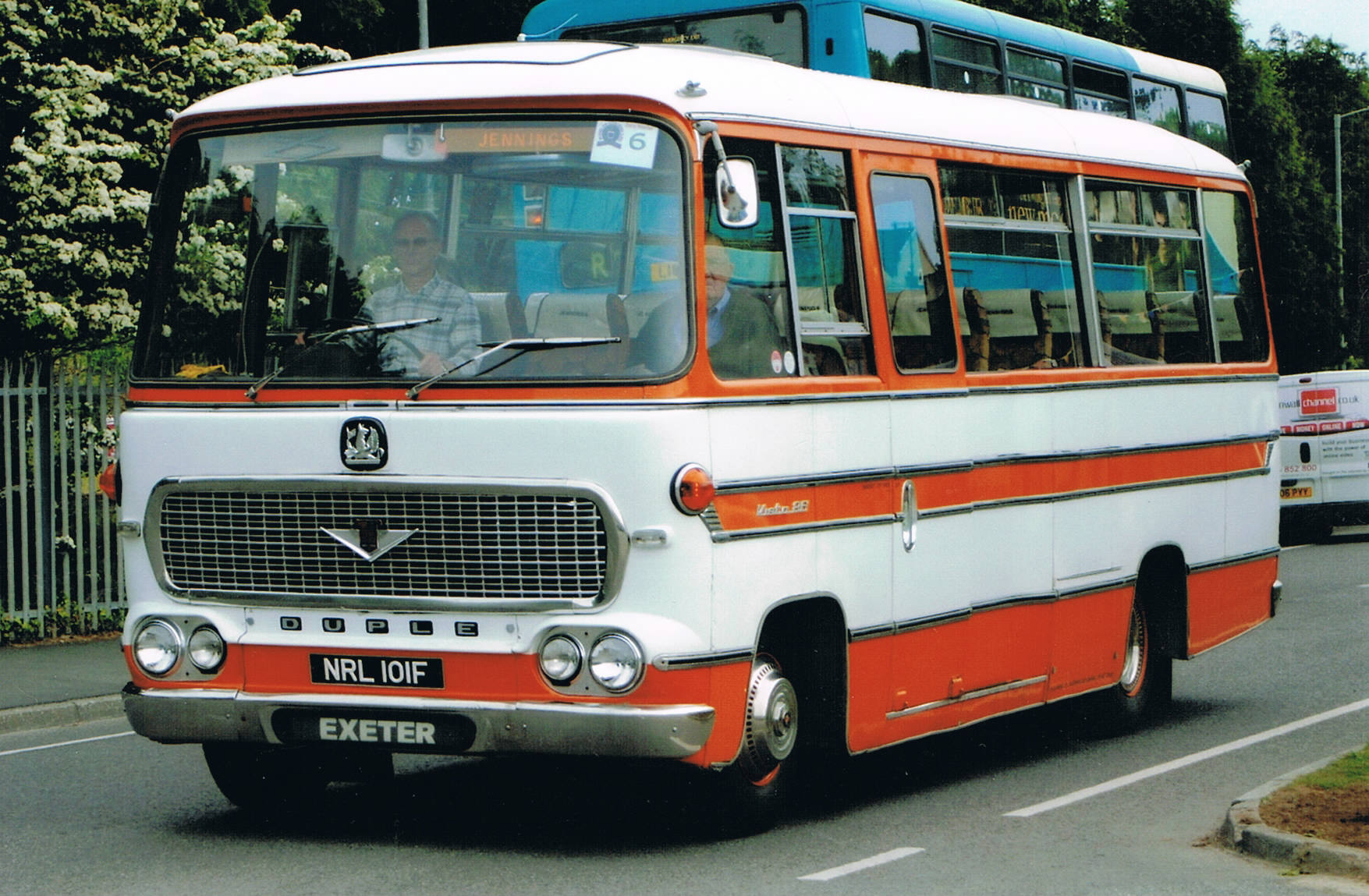
Bedford VAS with Duple Vista 25 bodywork

The Bedford VAS was a commercial vehicle chassis produced by Bedford Vehicles from 1963 until 1987. It was sold as a bare chassis including engine, transmission and driving controls, and was intended to be fitted with a bus or coach body from another manufacturer.

== Background ==
The Bedford subsidiary of Vauxhall Motors had produced rolling chassis suitable for single-deck buses and coaches since 1931, with models such as the WHB, WLB and WTB produced until 1939, to be succeeded by the OB/OWB in 1939 and, during the war, the OWB. The bodies were produced for these by outside coachbuilders such as Duple, and provided up to 32 seats in an overall length of around 24 feet 6 inches (7.47 m). The Bedford SB replaced the OB in 1950, and was longer with a greater seating capacity - typically 33 to 41. However, some operators still felt a need for a smaller vehicle. Consequently, Bedford introduced a new model in 1963, the VAS, which provided an overall length of up to around 23 feet 9 inches (7.24 m) upon which a 29-seat body could be fitted.

== Design ==
The basic layout was similar to the SB model, but the wheelbase was shorter. The chassis frame had two longitudinal main members arched over the front axle; at the rear they were tapered upwards to clear the rear axle. The axles were mounted close to the ends, to give a nominal front overhang of 36.5 inches (930 mm), a wheelbase of 164 inches (4.2 m) and a nominal rear overhang of 37 inches (940 mm). The engine and transmission were mounted above the front axle, with shaft drive to the rear axle. 16-inch (410 mm) road wheels were fitted. The driver's position was alongside the engine, the forward control arrangement.

A choice of two engines was offered, giving rise to numeric suffixes to the model code: the VAS1 used a 300 cu in (4.9 L) diesel engine, and the VAS2 used a 214 cu in (3.51 L) petrol engine. Both had a four-speed synchromesh gearbox, but the ratios differed. In 1967, the VAS1 was replaced by the VAS5, which used a 330 cu in (5.4 L) diesel engine. A 300 cu in (4.9 L) petrol engine was offered from about 1972, and this was model VAS3.

A new system of model codes was introduced by General Motors in 1968. Under this, the first letter (in this case, P) denoted the basic model range; the second letter denoted the engine type; and the third letter the gross weight range for a complete vehicle, which for a VAS was K, denoting 5,700–7,000 kg (5.6–6.9 long tons). Model codes for the VAS (now the P series) were as follows:

Model codes
Original code	Revised code	Engine type
VAS1	–	300 cu in (4.9 L) diesel
VAS2	PDK	214 cu in (3.51 L) petrol
VAS3	PFK	300 cu in (4.9 L) petrol
VAS5	PJK	330 cu in (5.4 L) diesel

== Bodywork ==
Several outside firms constructed bodywork for the VAS, primarily Duple and Plaxton. The short overhang at the front meant that the passenger entrance needed to be placed behind the front axle, as with the SB model. The short rear overhang was less of a problem, and the body builders usually added extension pieces to the rear of the main chassis frame, below which a luggage boot was usually fitted, bringing the overall length to around 23 feet 9 inches (7.24 m). Within this length, up to 29 seats could be accommodated: two alongside the driver, above the nearside front wheel; two behind the driver, opposite the entrance; five rows of four arranged as pairs either side of the central gangway; and a bench seat for five at the back.
