= Bedford TJ =

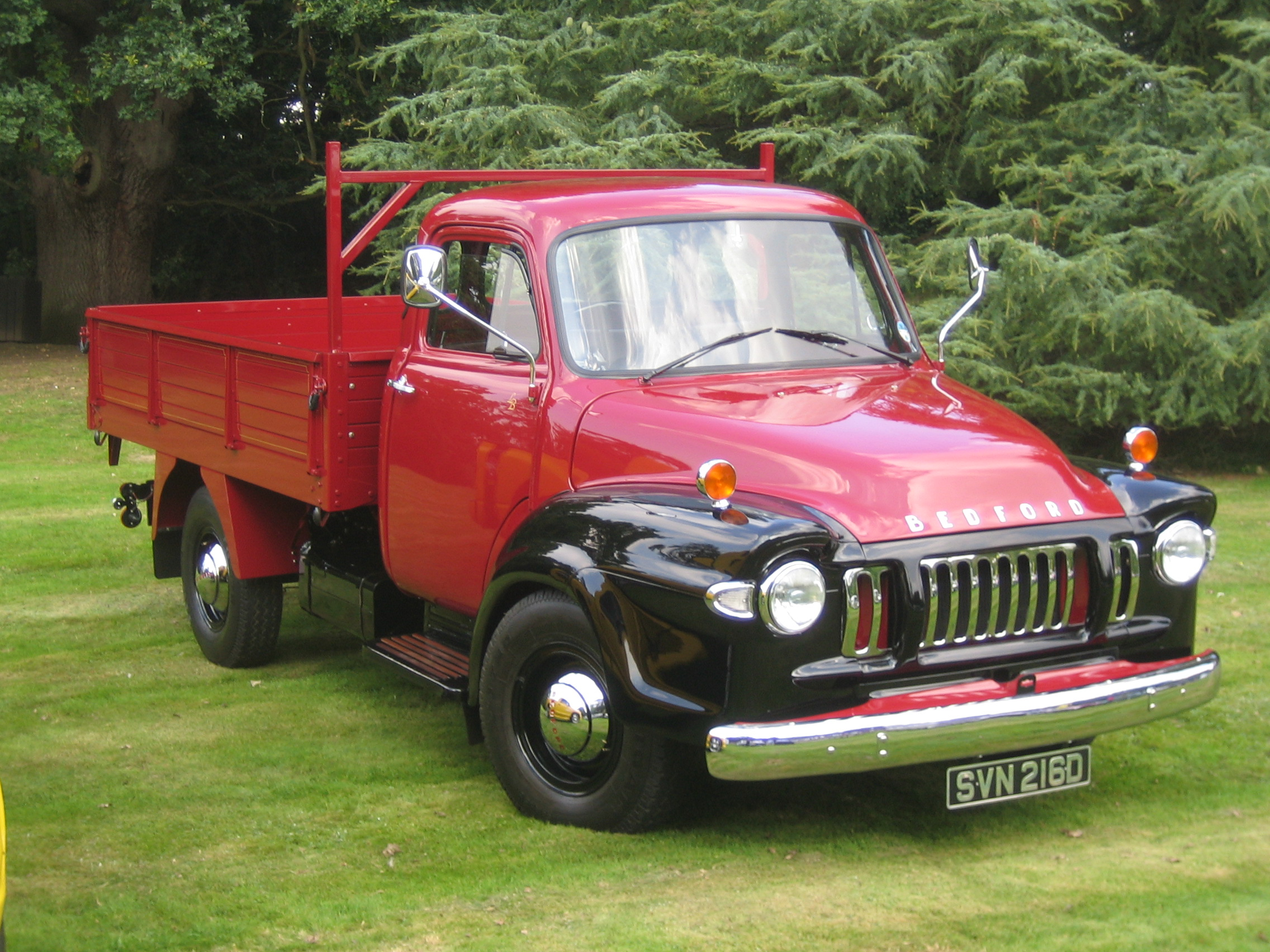
- 1966 Bedford TJ

Overview
- Manufacturer: Bedford; AWD Trucks; Marshall Aerospace & Defence Group
- Also called: AWD-Bedford TJ
- Production: 1958–1998
- Assembly: UK: Dunstable; UK: Cambridge Airport; India: Calcutta (Hindustan Motors); Malaysia: Petaling Jaya (Champion Motors); Nigeria: Apapa (UACN); Argentina: San Martín (GM Argentina)

Body and chassis
- Class: Medium-duty truck
- Related: Bedford TA

Dimensions
- Wheelbase: 101–138 in (2,565–3,505 mm)
- Length: 182–258 in (4,623–6,553 mm)
- Width: 80–90 in (2,032–2,286 mm)
- Height: 78–86 in (1,981–2,184 mm)
- Kerb weight: 3,359–6,655 lb (1,524–3,019 kg)

Chronology
- Predecessor: Bedford TD
- Successor: Bedford KB (for J0)

The Bedford TJ is a truck that was produced by Bedford and its successors from 1958 to 1998, as a replacement for the earlier Bedford A series of medium-duty trucks that were built between 1953 and 1958. The TJ was the last bonneted truck produced by the company, and the last vehicle to be produced to have a relation with Bedford.

== History ==
Production of the Bedford TJ began in 1958 as Bedford’s new bonneted truck model, and was a modernised version of the Bedford TD series, modelled after the Chevrolet Advance Design truck. The TJ truck was produced in many versions, ranging from light pickups to heavy-duty vehicles, with payloads up to 6-8 tons. Unfortunately, due to their relatively dated styling and presumably since bonneted trucks were falling out of favour these years, the TJ series was not very popular in the United Kingdom and did not sell in big numbers, with the exception of the AA and Post Office Telephones. In particular, Holland's Pies in Lancashire used a large fleet of TJ vans well into the 1980s, being notable for being kept in very clean condition and this resulted in the TJ being often called a 'Holland's pie van' around Lancashire.

The lightest versions (J0) shared the same 2,651 cc ohv I6 petrol engine as the Vauxhall Cresta, which offered relatively good performance. Maximum power is 104.5 bhp Gross (78 kW) and torque is 140 lb⋅ft (190 N⋅m) at 2,400 rpm. It sold in relatively good numbers in Britain and export markets throughout the 1960s and 1970s, before being replaced by the Bedford KB in 1976. Heavier variants used the same engine as on the Bedford TD series. In export markets, specifically in countries such as India, Pakistan, Africa and other developing nations, the TJ sold in great numbers due to its reliability and relatively low price compared to the competition. In 1975, the TJ was withdrawn from the UK market and superseded by the Bedford CF.

After 1975, the TJ was offered only for export where it was pretty successful, however, during the 1980s, exports to countries such as Australia and New Zealand stopped since it was clear that these trucks were very outdated, and couldn't compete in the market anymore due to changing emissions and regulations. Nevertheless, it continued production for export to developing countries. In 1987, the Dunstable plant was sold to David J.B. Brown and became AWD Trucks. Production of the TJ continued under the AWD Bedford badge. After Marshall SPV purchased AWD Trucks, production of the TJ series continued, but in limited numbers. The last TJ trucks were built in 1998, when an order was placed for 100 trucks to be exported to Kenya.

=== Nigeria ===
The Bedford TJ was assembled in Bedford's Nigerian plant in Apapa (Tin Can Island) by UACN, a Unilever operation which was 60 percent Nigerian-owned. By the end of the 1970s, the TJ was the most sold Bedford product in Nigeria, which was Bedford's main export market outside of Europe at the time.

=== Pakistan ===
In Pakistan, the J5/6 is very popular and dominated commercial vehicular traffic. It has a cult status among drivers and is known for its power, reliability, and durability. Over half of the trucks in Pakistan are Bedford vehicles.

=== India ===
An Indian company, Hindustan Motors, also produced the larger versions (J5/6) of the vehicle in that country from 1968. Production lasted for three decades, but the vehicle proved to be unable to compete with Tata and Ashok Leyland vehicles and was finally discontinued in 1998.

=== Australia ===
The TJ was widely exported. In Australia they were distributed by Holden.

=== Malaysia ===
Bedford TJ trucks were also produced in Malaysia from knock-down kits until the early 1980s. Towards the end of this period, after Bedford vehicles had lost their market lead, the TJ shared the assembly line with competing trucks from Toyota. As the design aged, Bedford's reputation shrank, the British pound went up, while Britain itself lost much of its standing in Malaysia. GM instead chose to focus more on promoting trucks from corporate stablemate Isuzu in that market. The TJ trucks were replaced by the Isuzu TX.

== Models ==
- J0 (often referred to as JO)
- J1
- J2
- J3
- J4
- J5
- J6

== Chassis codes ==
=== 1958 To June 1967 ===
- J1 30cwt.
- J2S 3ton.
- J2L 3ton. (GVM - 5ton)
- J2LC 3ton (GVM - 4.5ton)
- J3L 4ton.
- J4L 5ton.
- J4E 5ton.
- J4A 8ton tractor.
- J5S 6ton.
- J5L 6ton.
- J6S 7ton.
- J6L 7ton.

A 3rd or 4th number indicates engine type;

- 1 = 300cu. in Diesel
- 2 = 214cu. in Petrol
- 3 = 300cu. in Petrol
- 5 = 330cu. in Diesel
- 7 = 200cu. in Diesel
- 10 =220cu. in Diesel

=== July 1967 onwards ===
Chassis codes changed in July 1967 to ensure Bedford complied with new legislation introduced in the UK (Construction and Use Regulations).

- CDD/CHD 30cwt.
- CDJ/CHJ 3ton.
- CDL/CHL 4ton.
- CFM/CJM 5ton.
- CFN/CJN 6ton.
- CFQ/CJQ 7 ton.

The 3rd letter is for the weight rating, while the 2nd letter indicates engine type;

- D = 214cu. in Petrol
- F = 300cu. in Petrol
- H = 220cu. in Diesel
- J = 330cu. in Diesel

== Engines ==
The engines available included:

Available engines (outputs are gross numbers)
Displacement	Bore x Stroke	Cylinders	Power/rpm	Torque/rpm	Fuel
214.7 cu in (3,519 cc)	3.375 in × 4.00 in (85.7 mm × 101.6 mm)	Inline-six	100 bhp (75 kW) at 3,600	184 lb⋅ft (249 N⋅m) at 1,200	Petrol
300.7 cu in (4,927 cc)	3.875 in × 4.25 in (98.4 mm × 108.0 mm)	Inline-six	133 bhp (99 kW) at 3,000	267 lb⋅ft (362 N⋅m) at 1,200	Petrol
200.5 cu in (3,285 cc)	3.875 in × 4.25 in (98.4 mm × 108.0 mm)	Inline-four	64 bhp (48 kW) at 2,800 (Note: Net figures are 57 bhp (43 kW) at 2,600 rpm and 139 lb⋅ft (188 N⋅m) at 1,400 rpm.)	143 lb⋅ft (194 N⋅m) at 1,400	Diesel
220.5 cu in (3,614 cc)	4.0625 in × 4.25 in (103.2 mm × 108.0 mm)	Inline-four	70 bhp (52 kW) at 2,800	157 lb⋅ft (213 N⋅m) at 1,400	Diesel
300.7 cu in (4,927 cc)	3.875 in × 4.25 in (98.4 mm × 108.0 mm)	Inline-six	97 bhp (72 kW) at 2,800	217 lb⋅ft (294 N⋅m) at 1,400	Diesel
330.7 cu in (5,420 cc)	4.0625 in × 4.25 in (103.2 mm × 108.0 mm)	Inline-six	107 bhp (80 kW) at 2,800	238 lb⋅ft (323 N⋅m) at 1,800	Diesel

== Gallery ==
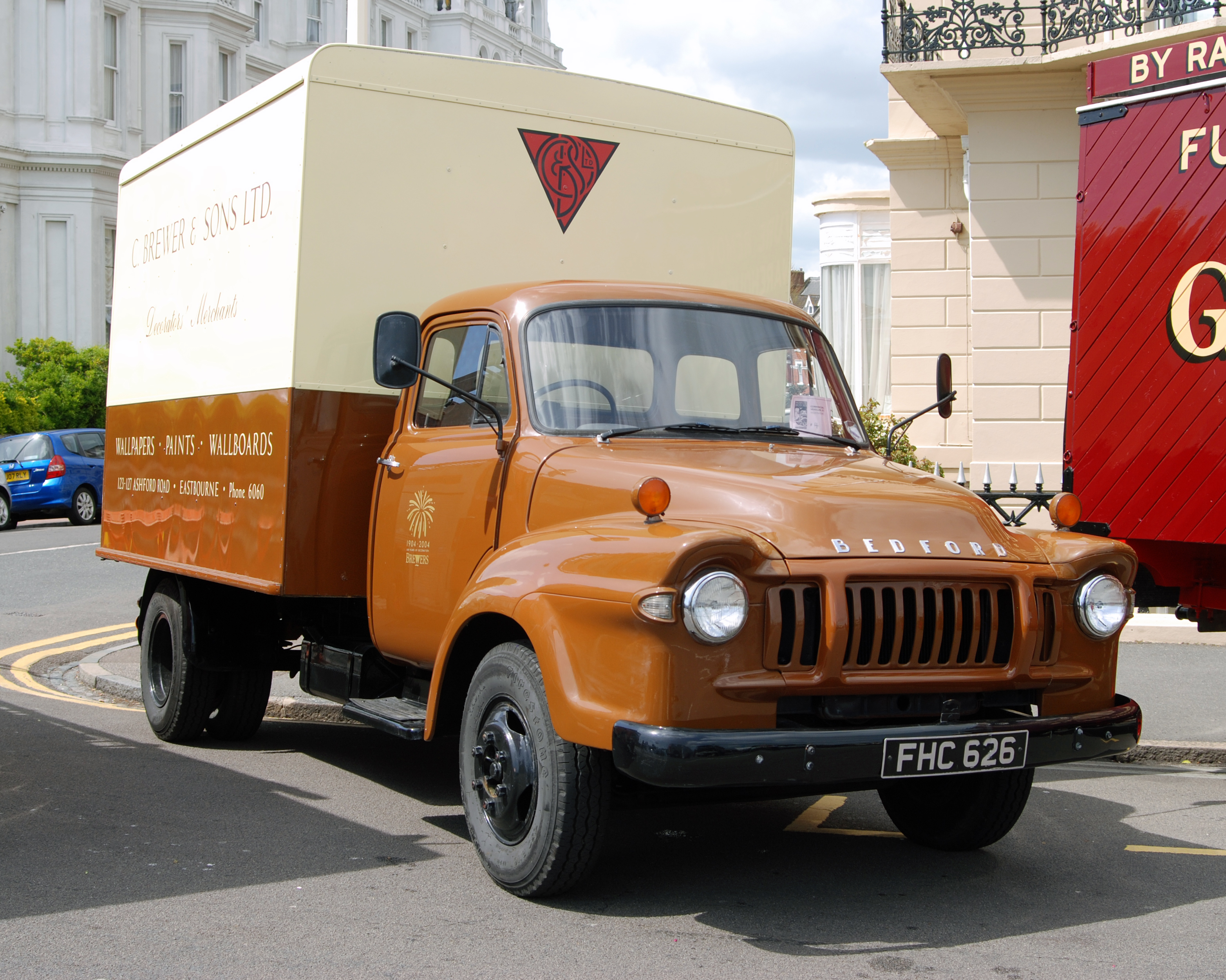
Bedford J5 box truck

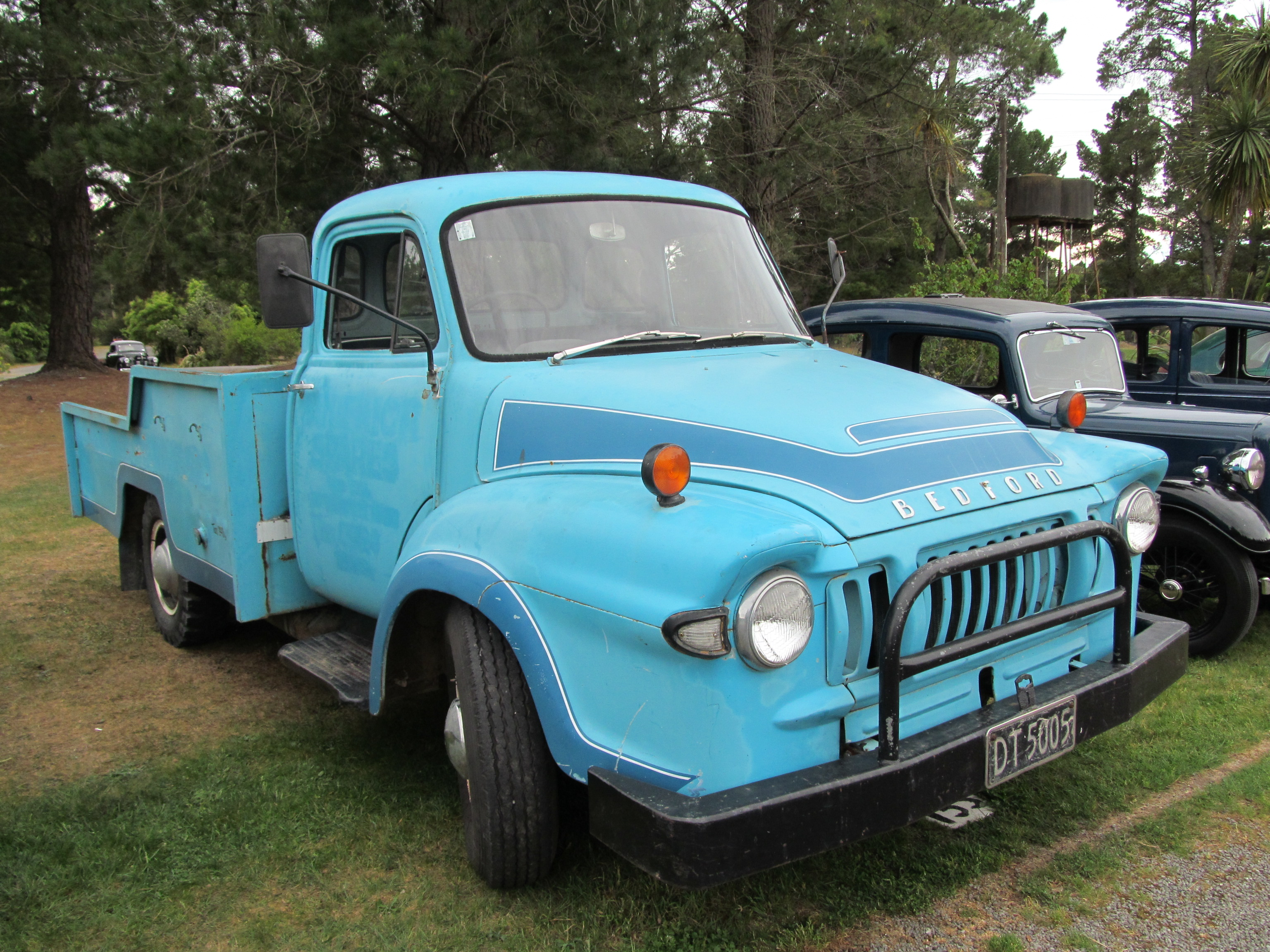
1968 Bedford J1

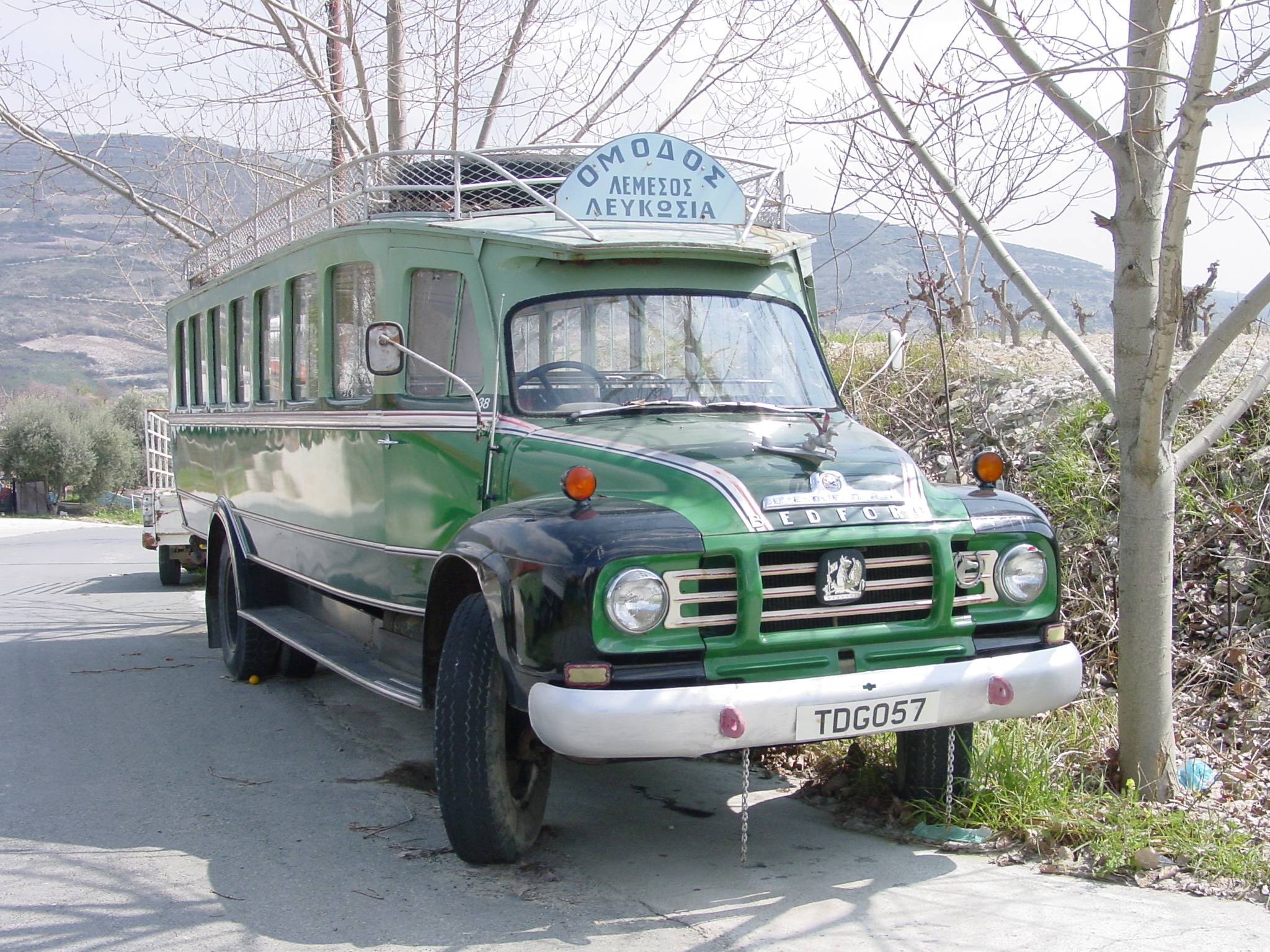
Bedford TJ trucks used as buses in Cyprus

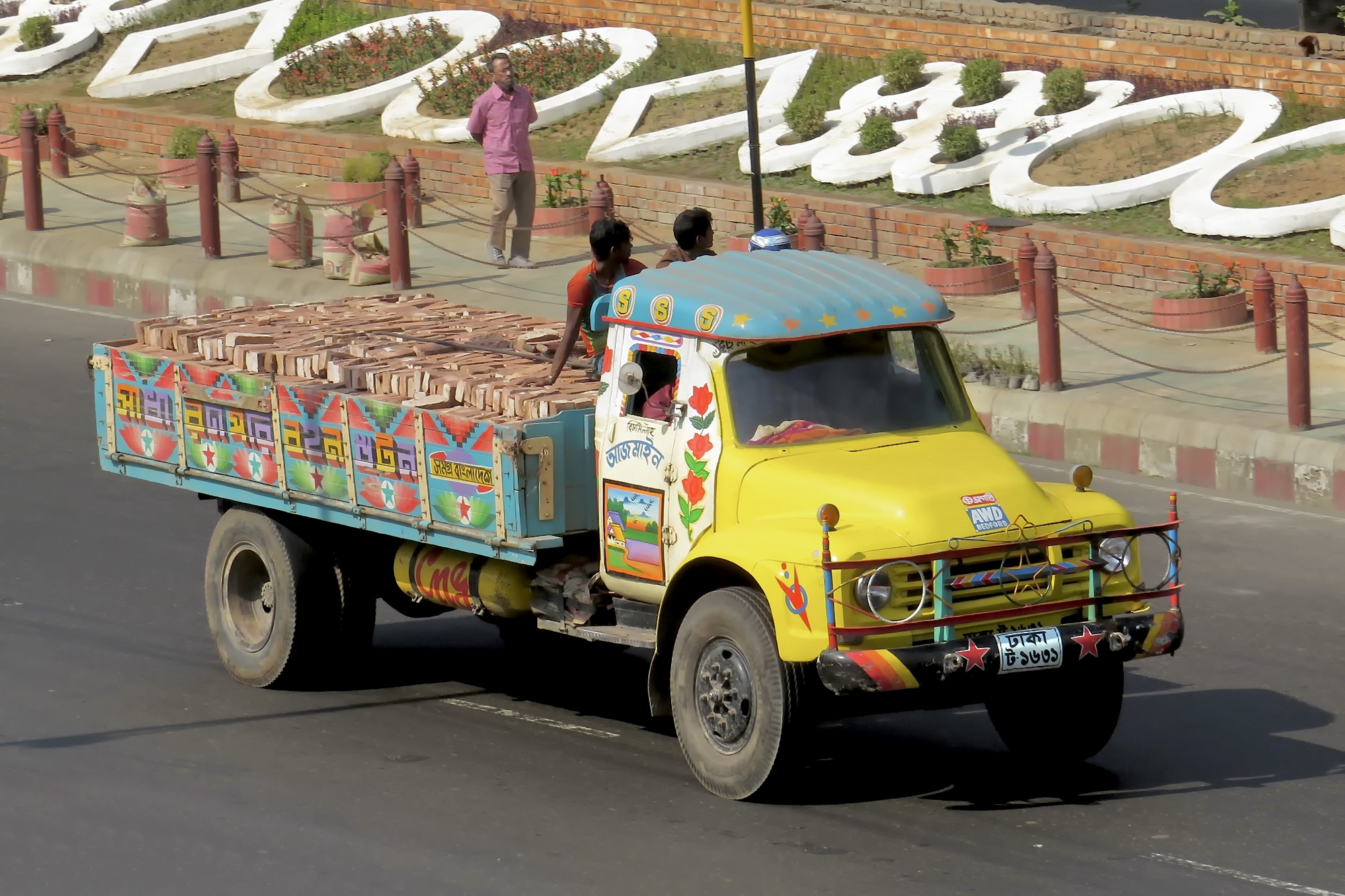
AWD Bedford TJ truck in Bangladesh

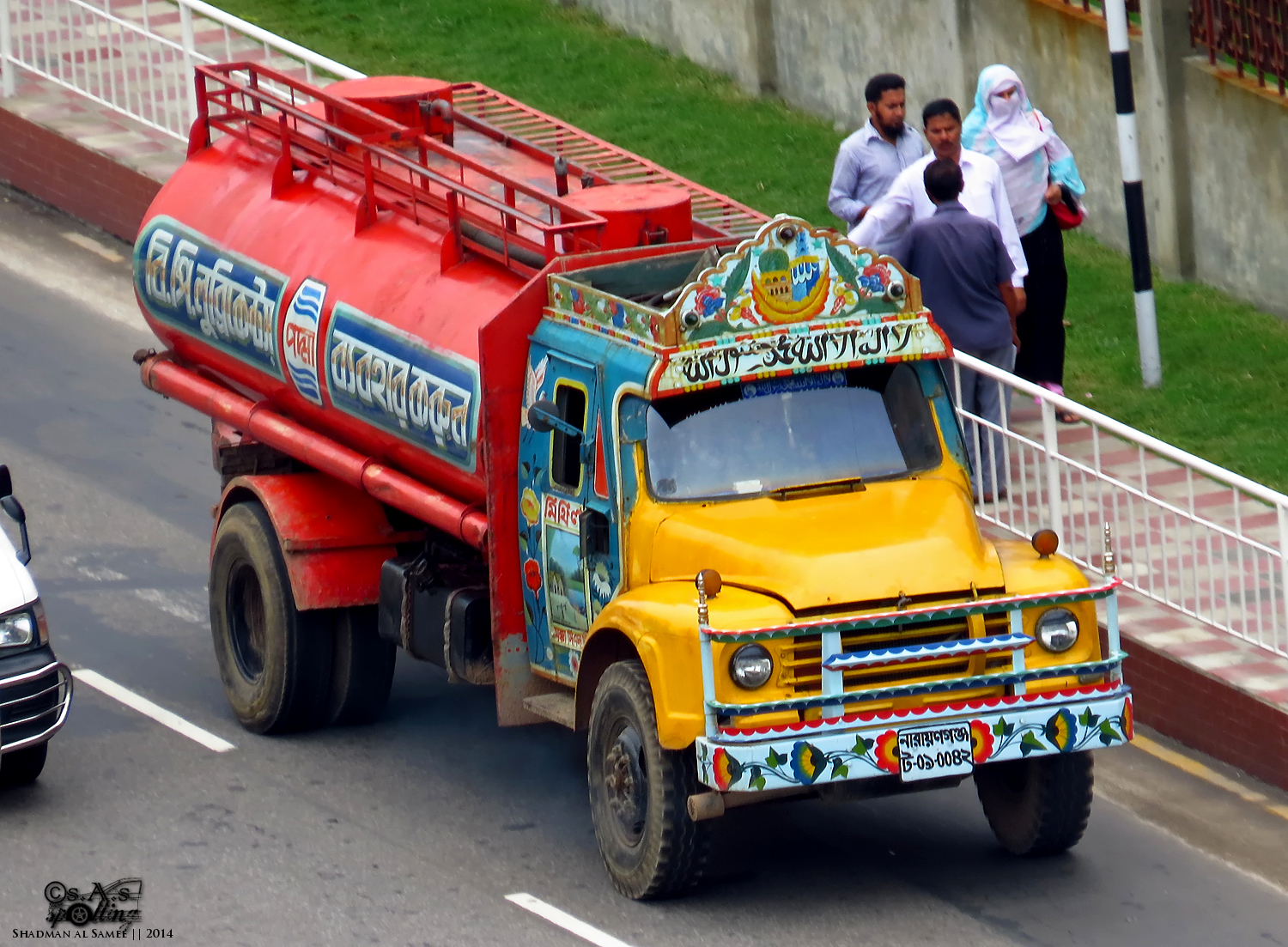
Bedford TJ fuel tanker in Bangladesh.

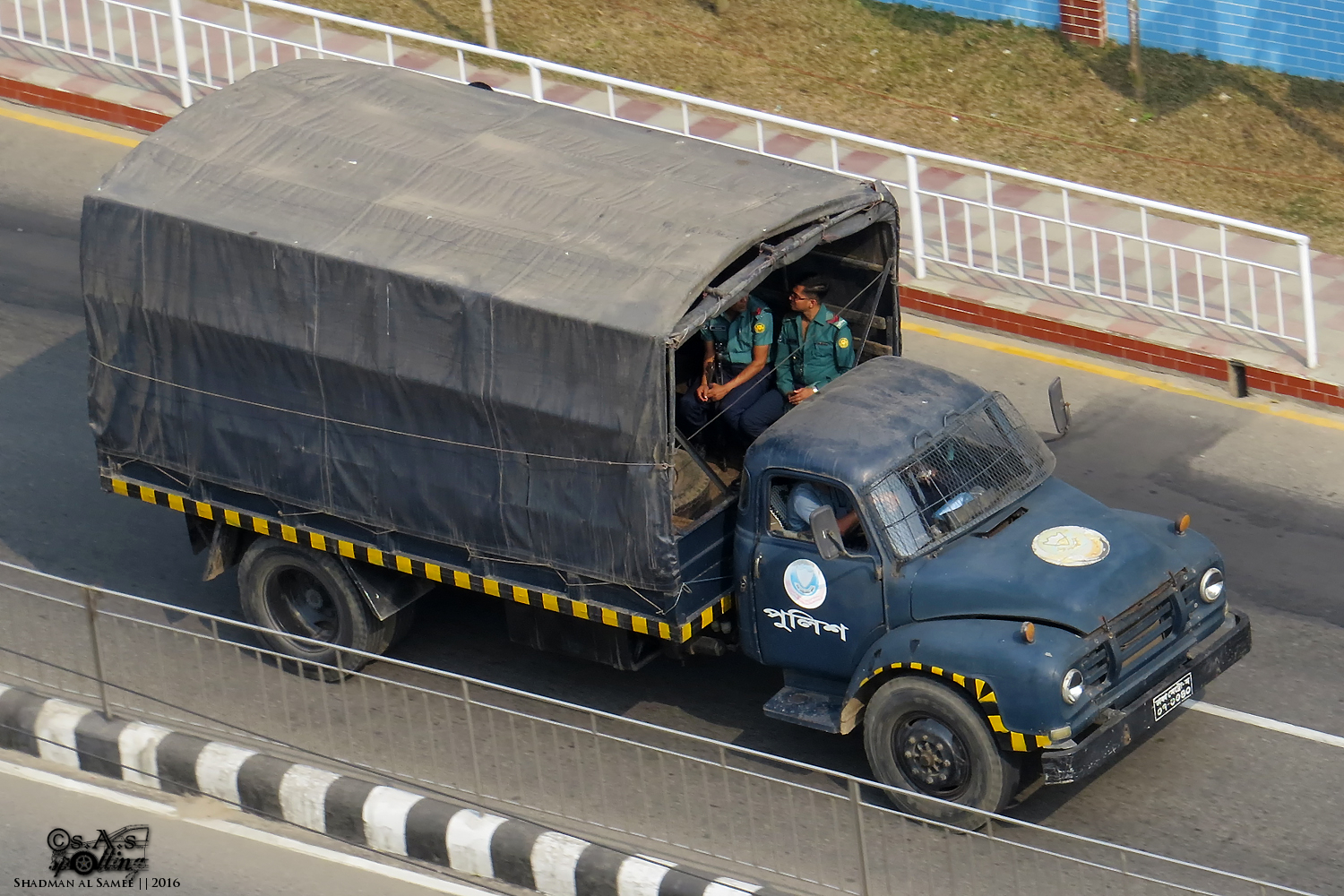
Bedford TJ truck belonging to the Dhaka Metropolitan Police.

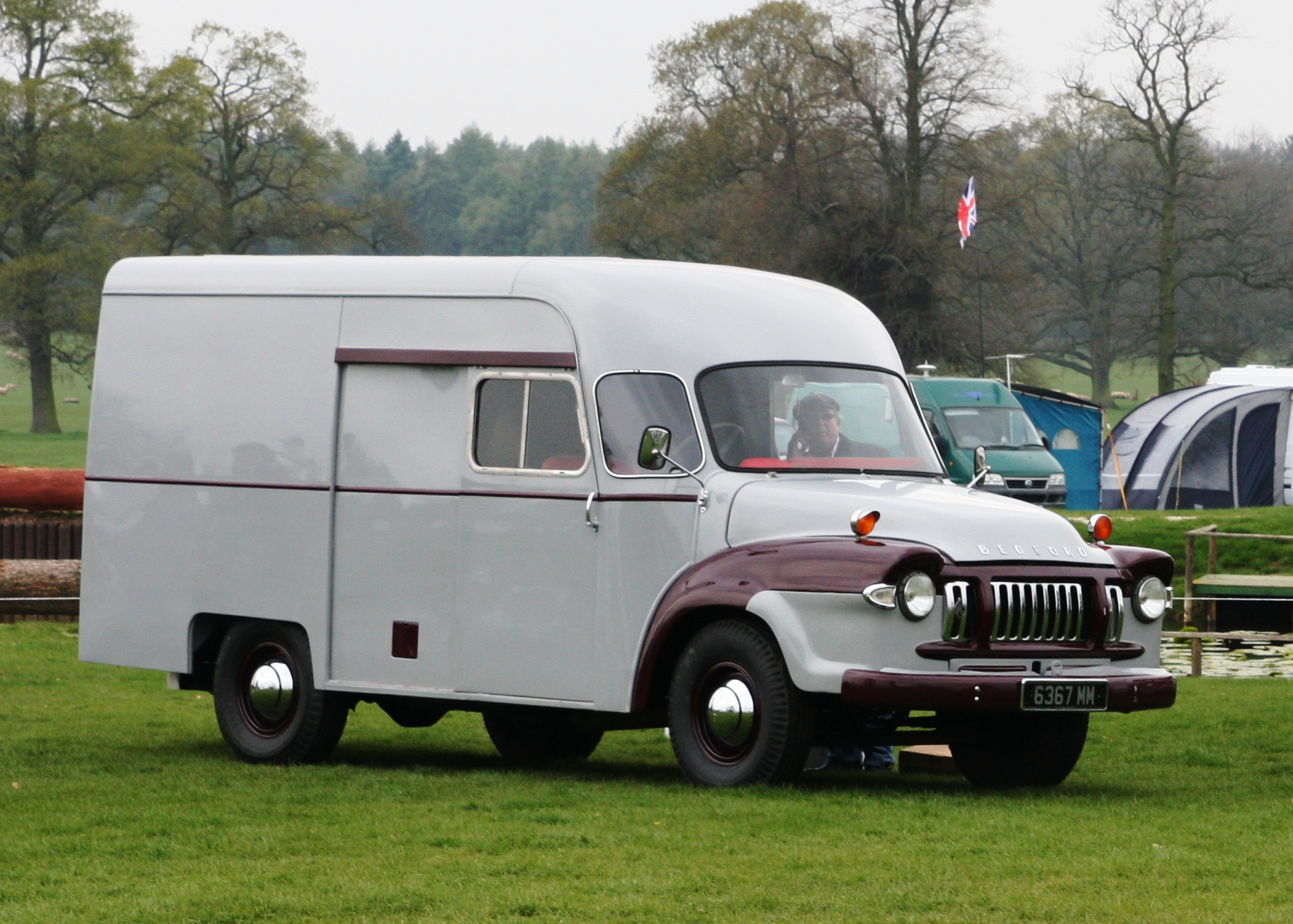
Bedford TJ with walk-through van body

== See also ==
- Customised buses and trucks in Pakistan
