= Stovebolt =

The terminology and the slang usage of Stovebolt refers to three different things:

- A bolt (fastener) with a slotted head, used in the assembly of wood-burning stoves constructed from sheet metal.
- The Chevrolet Stovebolt engine, so called because the valve cover, lifter cover and timing cover, utilizes a fastener that resembles a stovebolt.
- A nickname for the Chevrolet Advance Design pickup trucks.
