= Bedford Dunstable plant =

Vehicle assembly plant in England

- Built: 1942
- Location: Dunstable, Bedfordshire, England
- Industry: Motor vehicle assembly
- Products: Bedford Vehicles
- Employees: 5,500
- Area: 98 acres (40 ha)
- Defunct: 1992

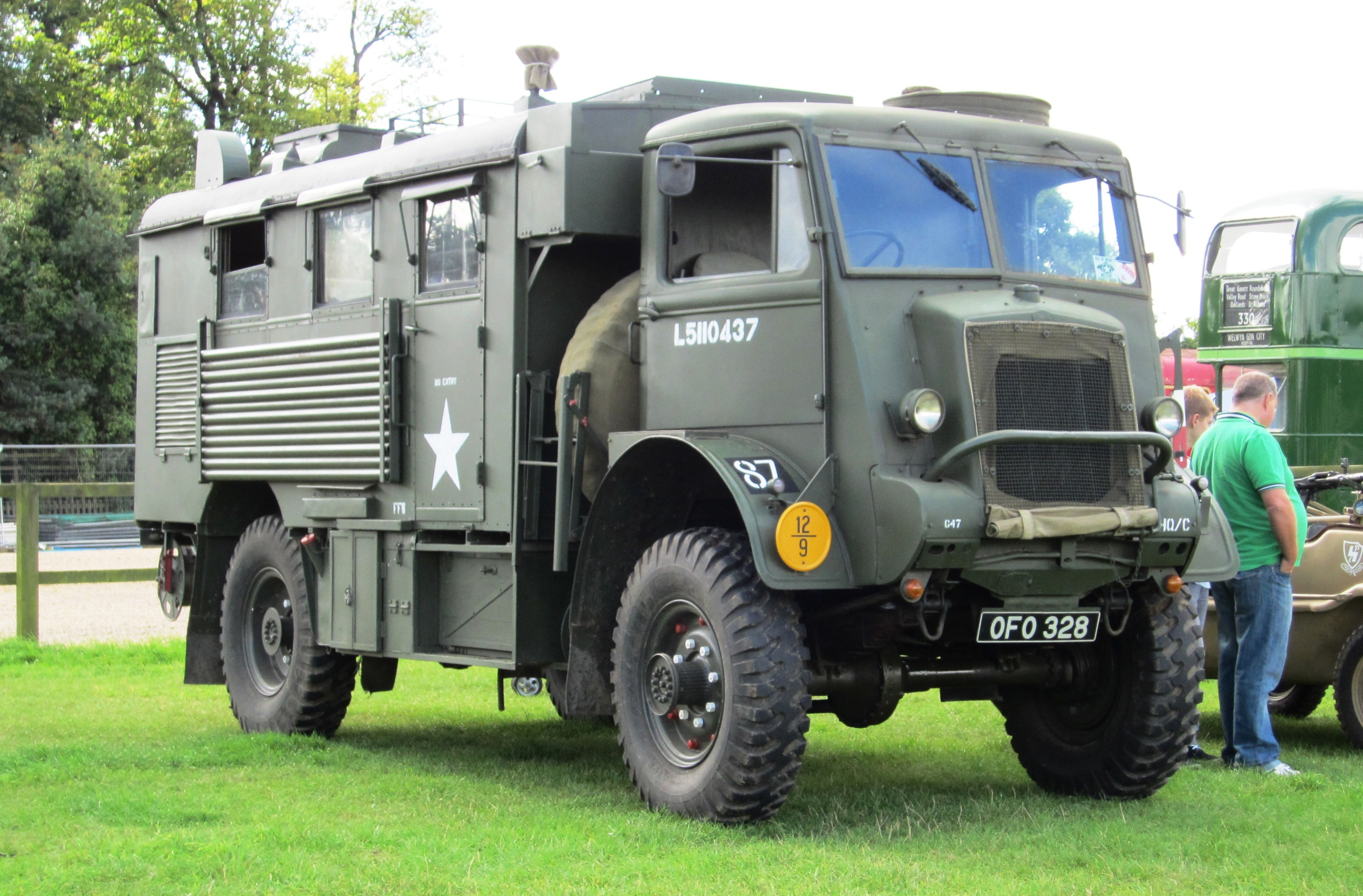
Preserved 1944 Bedford QL truck, at a rally in Hertfortshire, 2011

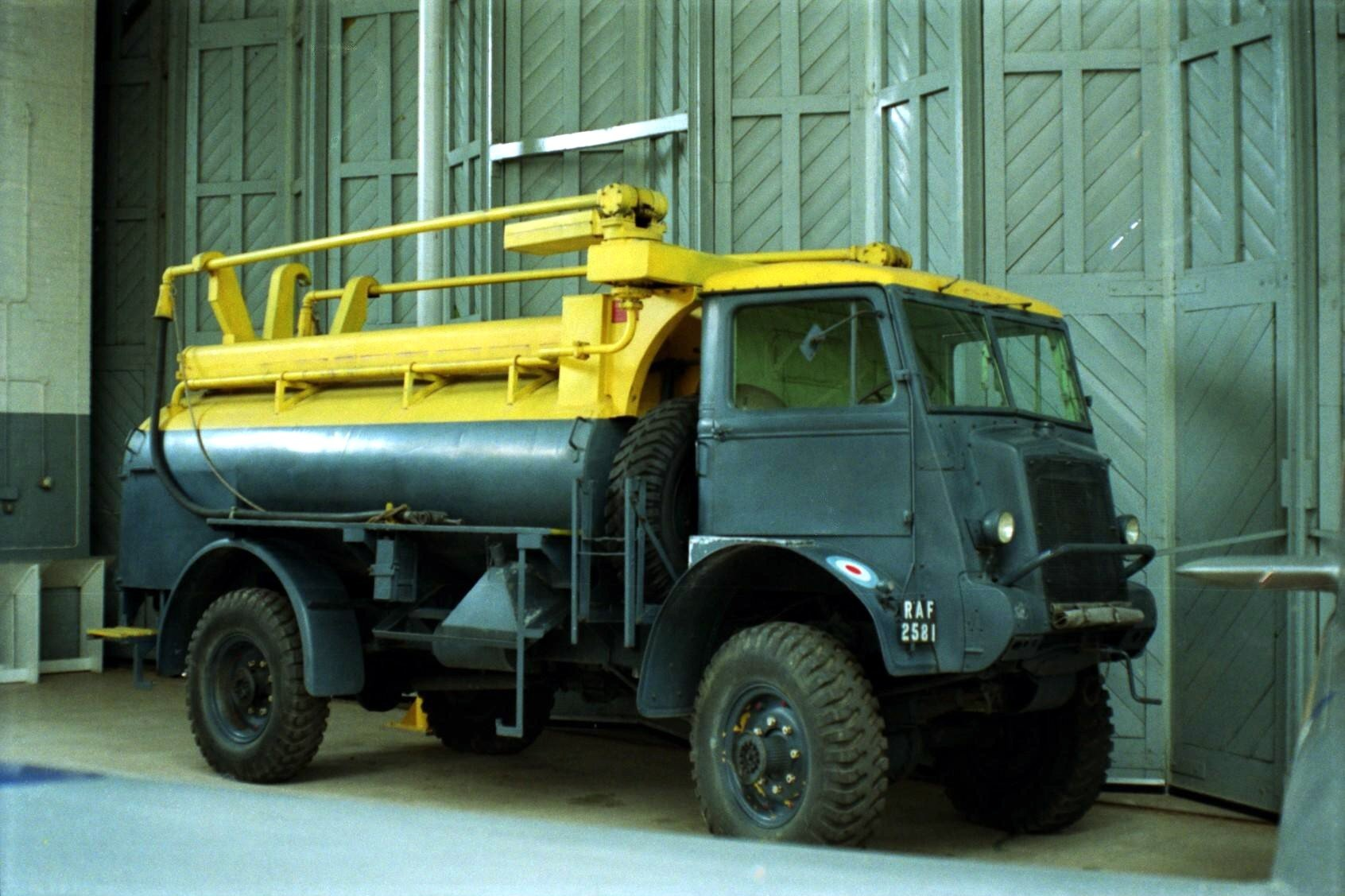
Preserved Bedford QL refueling truck, built for the Royal Air Force

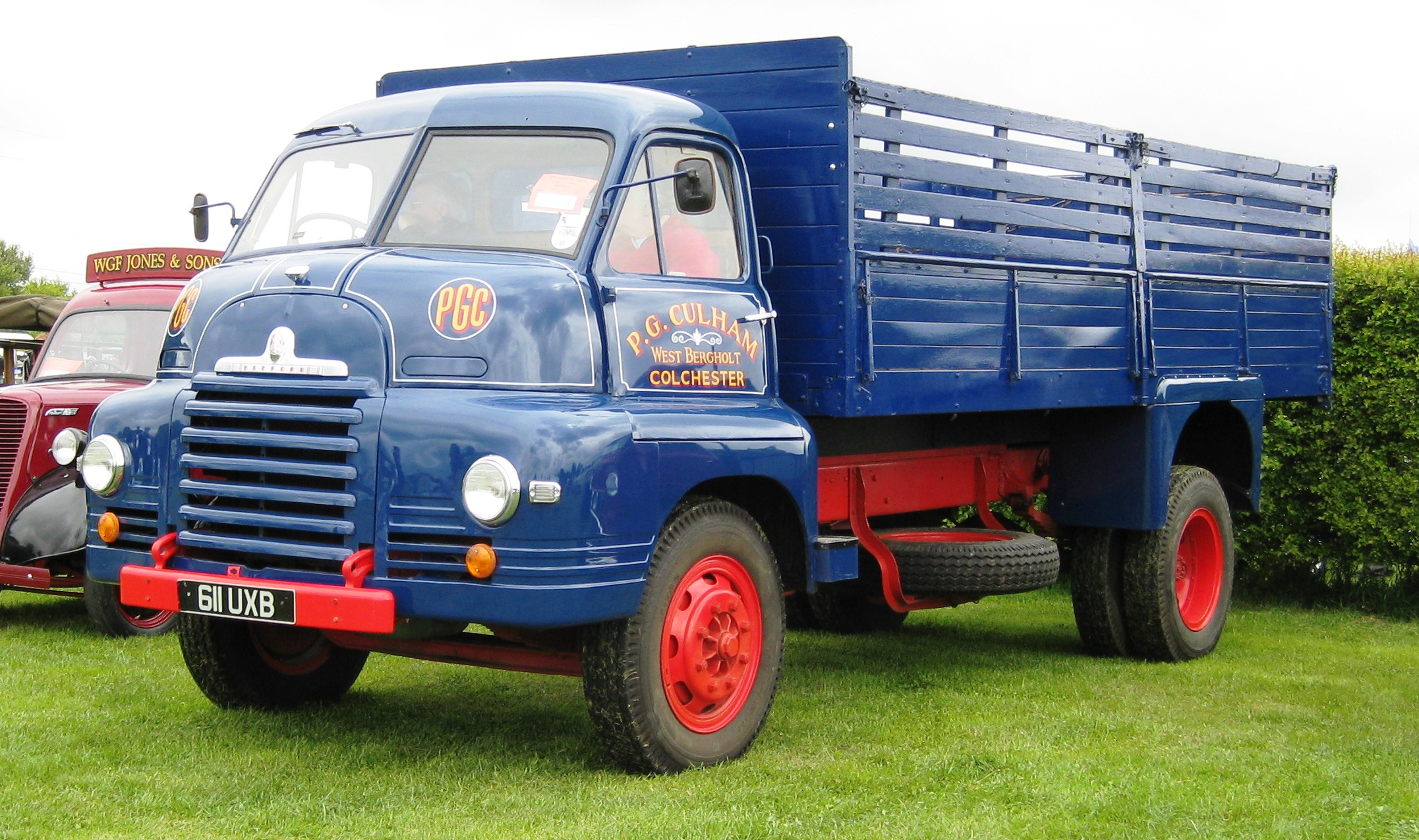
1954 Bedford S-type

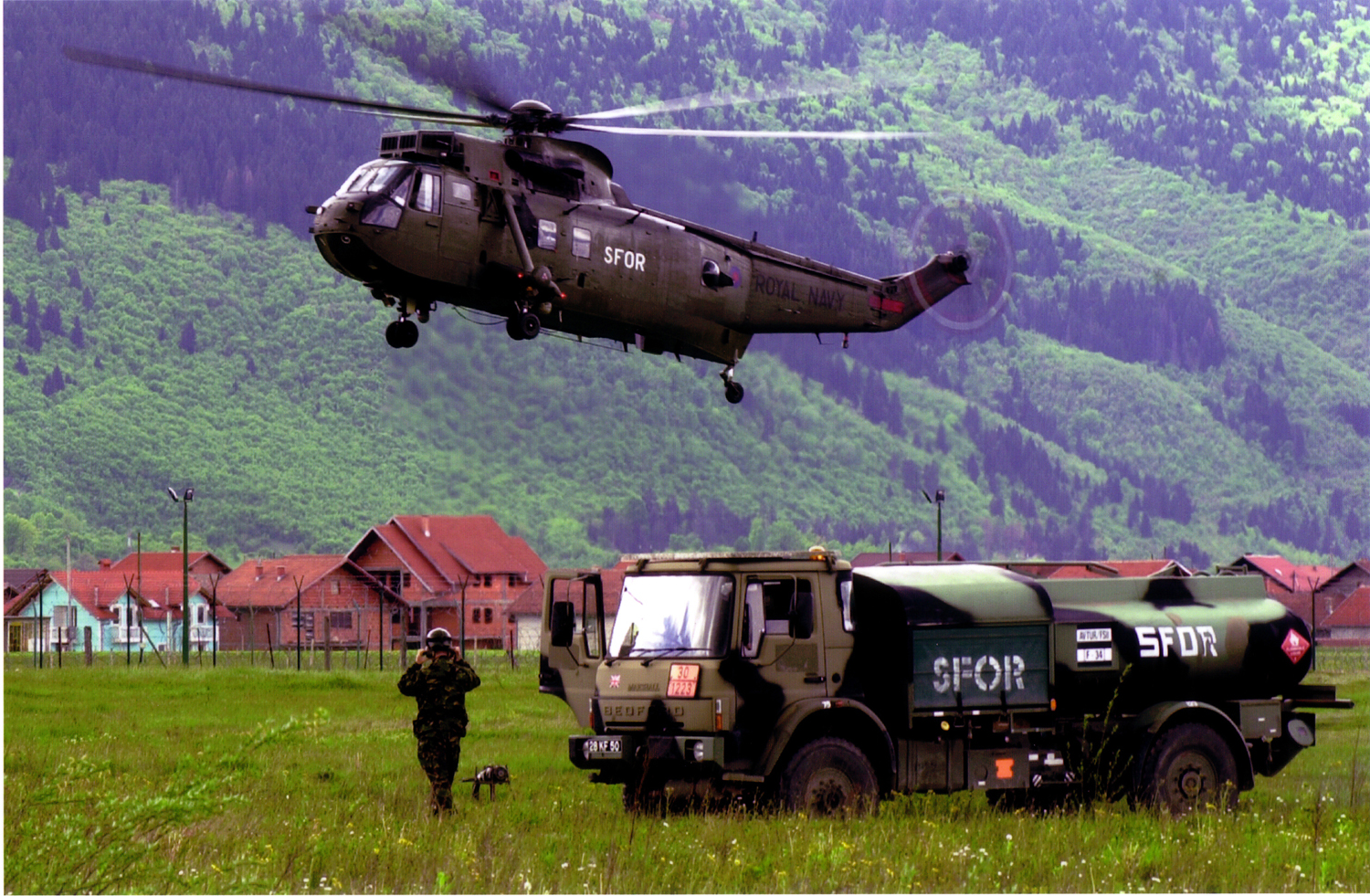
Bedford truck on duty with the British Army in Bosnia, as part of SFOR

The Bedford Dunstable plant was a truck and bus vehicle assembly plant, located in Dunstable, Bedfordshire, England. Developed and opened by Vauxhall Motors in 1942 under instruction from the Ministry of Production as a shadow factory, it was transferred to the Bedford Vehicles unit in the 1950s. Closed after receivership in 1992, it was subsequently demolished and redeveloped as a retail park and associated industrial estate.

== Background ==
In 1931, the now General Motors owned Vauxhall launched a bus and truck division called Bedford Vehicles. Produced at the companies existing Luton site, the first Bedford's were reworked Chevrolet vehicles. Bedford introduced their first own original design, the Q series lorries and buses, turning itself into a distinctive marque.

By the start of World War II, Bedford had become a major supplier to the British Army, with the Q series being used in every possible configuration. Those destined for D-Day were waterproof tested at Wardown Park lake. In preparation for the main assault, the Ministry of Production asked Vauxhall to produce the Churchill Tank, which would require the company to access additional production. hence with Government money, the company agreed to open a new site in Dunstable.

== History ==
The plant opened on a 98 acres (40 ha) site in Boscombe Road, Dunstable in 1942. As much of the output was destined for the war effort, the factory was served by the Dunstable Branch Lines, which both brought raw materials and sub-assemblies in, and took finished products out.

In the 1950s, the decision was made to move all truck and bus production from Luton to Dunstable, although Luton retained van production until the demise of the Bedford brand at the end of the 1980s. GM invested in two new 800,000 square feet (74,000 m^{2}) double story factories, built between 1955 and 1957, which covered an area of 46 acres (19 ha). The resultant production line was 1 mile (1.6 km) long, and the entire site employed 5,500 people, on an average wage of £10 per week.

The later developed Commer lorry factory was located on the far side of Boscombe Road.

=== 1980s ===
By the 1980s, Bedford's main markets were in military vehicle production (TL and TM series) and producing bus chassis for the cheaper end of the coach market. But already the factory was downsizing, and shedding jobs.

The major blow came when Bedford failed to win the UK Ministry of Defence contract to produce the standard 4 ton 4x4 GS (general service) truck for the British forces. This was despite the fact that the Bedford candidate had performed equally in extensive test to the Leyland (later Leyland DAF) candidate, and the British Army expressed a preference to continue the trusted relationship with Bedford trucks. The reasons for this decision were seen by many as political, as the Army 4 tonner contract was seen by the Thatcher government as essential for the long-term survival of Leyland and the formation of Leyland-DAF. The implications of the decision were also noted by GM in Detroit, who had already been refused permission to buy the Land Rover division of British Leyland, which they had intended to operate in tandem with the Bedford Truck division as major force a military and civilian 4x4 market.

With cheaper far-Eastern sourced and more technically advanced vehicles now available on the commercial market, GM took the decision to concentrate the Bedford brand on light vans, which would be re-badged Isuzu models assembled at Luton. The decision was taken to sell the Bedford brand and Dunstable site.

=== David John Bowes Brown and AWD ===
The Dunstable site and associated and business was sold in 1987 to AWD Ltd, a company owned by David John Bowes Brown. The AWD name was used as GM would only allow the use of the Bedford name for military trucks. David John Bowes Brown was the designer in 1973 of the then DJB D250 Articulated Dump Truck, built in Peterlee, England, by DJB Engineering Ltd. DJB was renamed Artix in 1985 when the trucks were rebadged as Caterpillar. Artix itself was sold to Caterpillar in 1996.

AWD continued with the TL and TM range. The AWD Bedford TK (a rebadged and modernised version of the Bedford TK/MK range) was also produced and supplied to the British military. Due to cheaper competition and the virtual collapse of the UK market in which AWD competed in 1989/90, the company went into receivership in 1992. The AWD brand was bought by dealer network Marshall of Cambridge, while the Dunstable site was to be redeveloped by the receiver.

== Redevelopment ==
Conrad Ritblat had been instructed to carry out a redevelopment and planning appraisal in 1987. The team was led by John Riding and they successfully obtained retail consent for part of the site. The former warehouse of 8,000m2 attached to the main factory was let. The Receivers (KPMG) began demolishing the oldest buildings in 1993.

The area towards Dunstable Road was the first to be redeveloped, with a Sainsbury's supermarket (already pre-let by Conrad Ritblat) the initial core of a retail development that included units occupied by McDonald's and Kwik-Fit. In 1997 more single-storey buildings were demolished and a new retail park was built north of Sainsbury's, which presently includes a Staples, Kentucky Fried Chicken, Currys and a DFS furniture outlet.

The two 1950s factories were rented out as distribution space, to companies that included IKEA. These were eventually demolished in 2005, together with the works iconic water tower. The replacement modern distribution units are now occupied by companies that include Cinram UK Ltd, Superdrug Ltd and Christian Salvesen, who operate a parts distribution contract for IBC Vehicles, one of the successors to Bedford and Commer, and Renault Trucks.
