= Bedford TA =

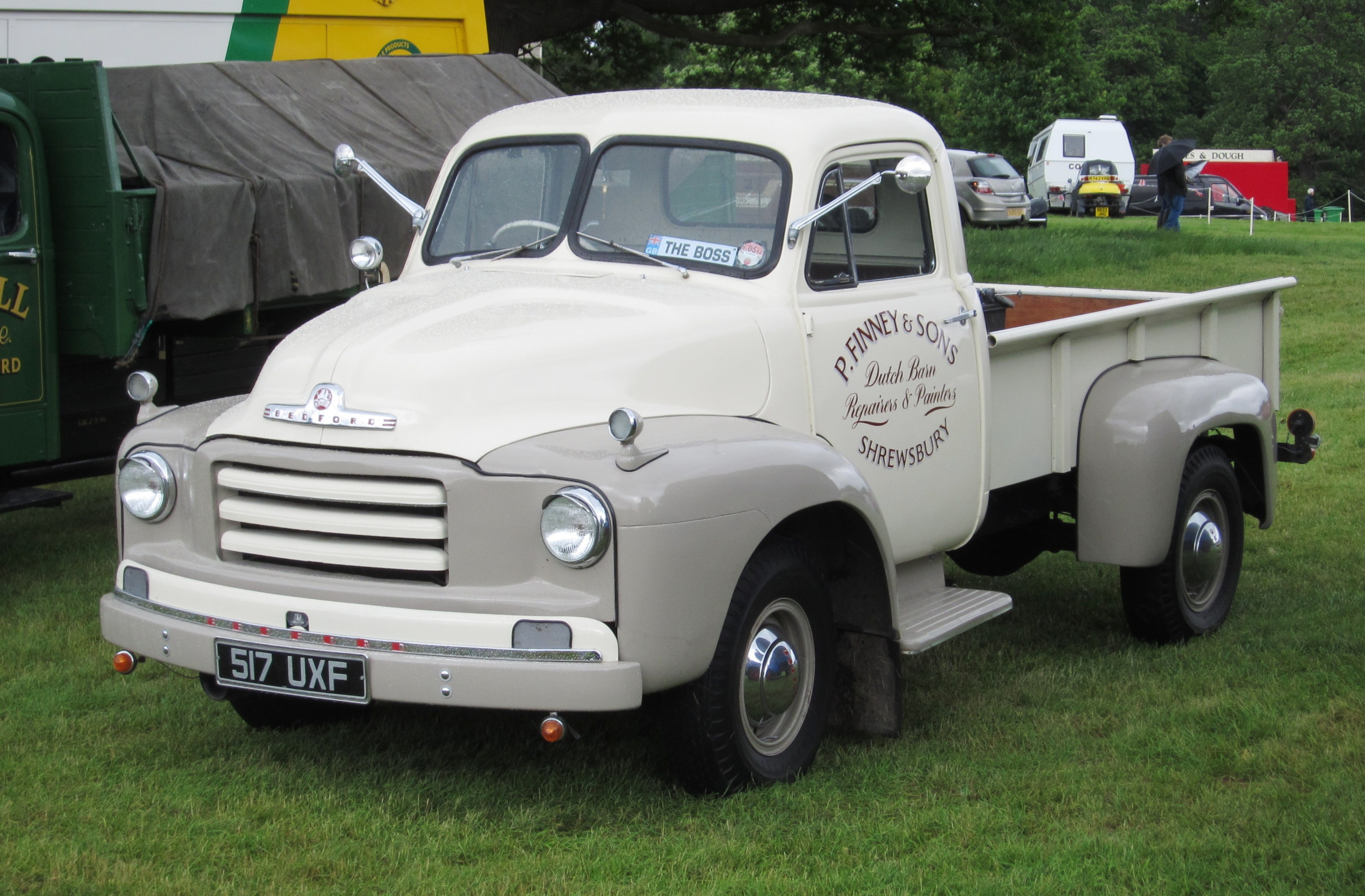

Overview
- Manufacturer: Bedford
- Also called: Bedford A
- Production: 1953-1958 (continued production as the TJ)

Body and chassis
- Class: Medium-Duty truck
- Body style: 2-door truck
- Layout: FR layout
- Related: Bedford TJ

Dimensions
- Wheelbase: 2,946–4,198 mm (116.0–165.3 in)
- Length: 5,093–6,560 mm (200.5–258.3 in)
- Width: 80–90 in (2,032–2,286 mm)
- Height: 107–112 in (2,700–2,800 mm)
- Curb weight: 2,003–5,380 kg (4,416–11,861 lb)

Chronology
- Predecessor: Bedford K/M/O series
- Successor: Bedford TJ

The Bedford TA (also called Bedford A) is a medium-duty truck produced by Bedford Vehicles from 1953 to 1958, as a replacement for the older Bedford K/M/O series. In total around 200,000 TA trucks were built, until it was eventually modernised as the newer TJ.

The truck was an all new vehicle compared to its predecessors, and competed with similar vehicles from other manufacturers although the TA and TD were more popular than most competitors due to their larger engines, which were a development of the Stovebolt units. Apart from the main Chevrolet-derived 6-cylinder engines, various 4- and 6-cylinder Perkins diesel engines were also available.

== Development ==
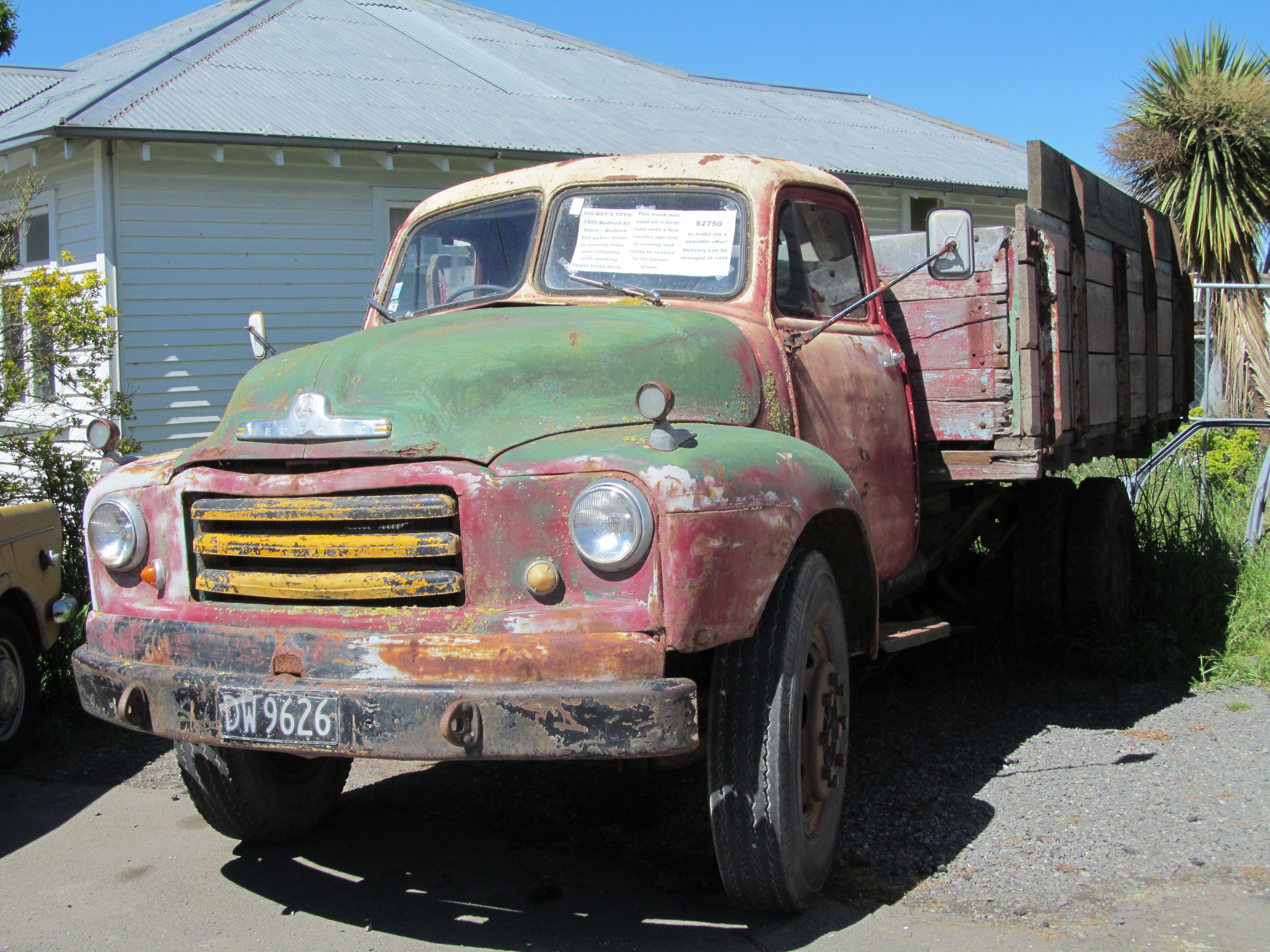
1957 Bedford A5

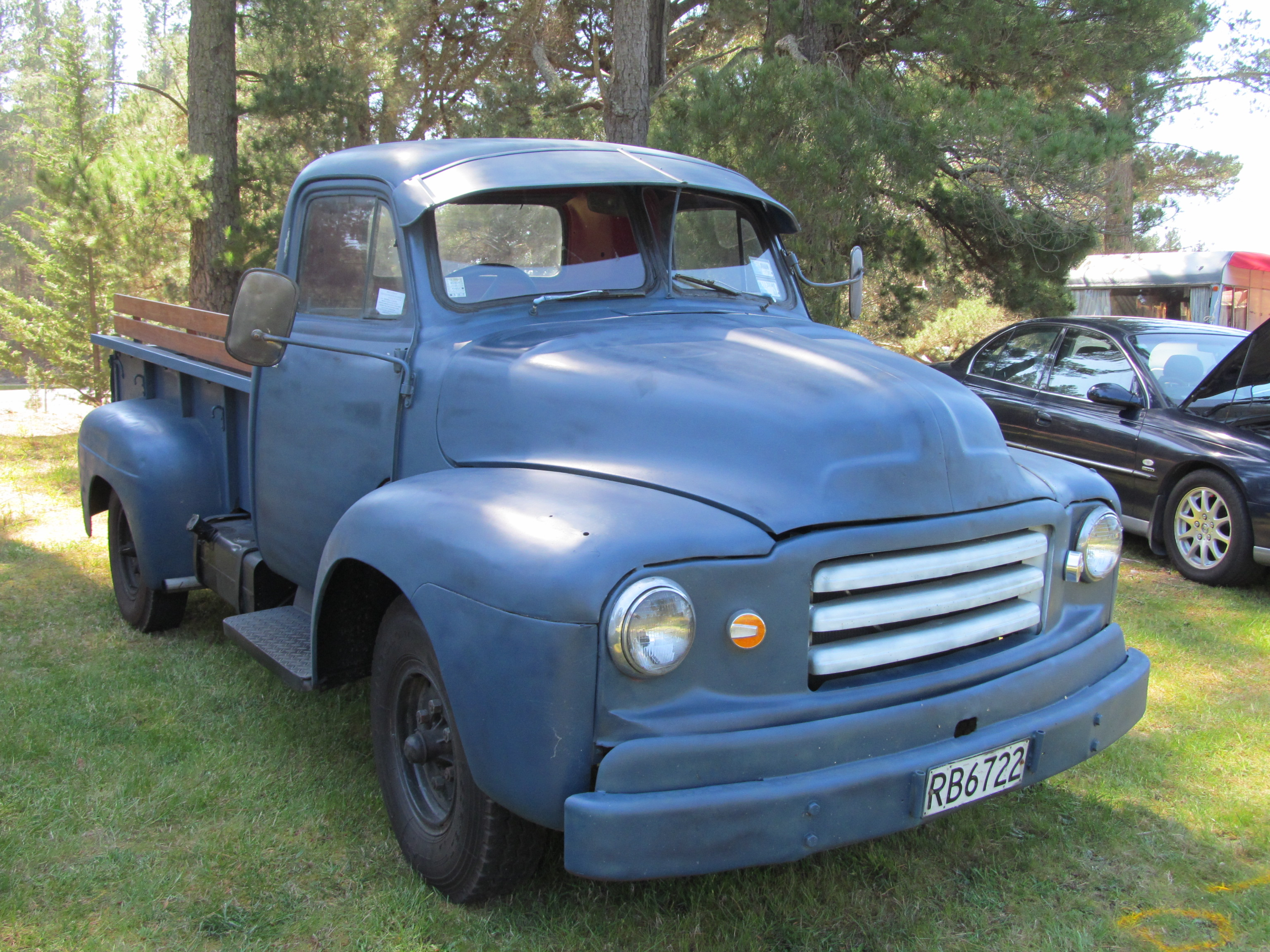
1953 Bedford A1

With the end of the Second World War, the Bedford factories had been converted into suitable only for military production for the war effort and were in a precarious state, so the revert process back to civilian production was not an easy one, resulting in the company being forced to limp on with the outdated Bedford K/M/O trucks. In order remain profitable, Bedford decided to prioritize their production mostly for export, something that happened with almost all British vehicle companies in a new fashion called "Export or Die" that was also responsible for the development of the Land Rover that became a legend.

During that time General Motors, the parent of Vauxhall Motors that controlled Bedford, was thriving in the United States with new models on the commercial truck market with the Chevrolet and GMC Advance Design range, which were the most popular truck in the USA at the market during that time around. To cut costs it was decided to import a Chevrolet Advance Design truck in the Luton factory, to create a new model based on the tooling of the American truck instead of entirely developing a new one.

During the launch of the TA series, many motoring presses noted the similarities between the Advance Design and the TA, and suggested that some panels were even interchangeable, but Bedford proclaimed that apart from a similarity in design (that was also applied to the re-designed 1950s Opel Blitz) there was no mechanical commonality between these trucks, since if the company was going to "copy" the design of the American truck there were going to be production problems in order to adjust the American tooling and dies to the then British machines due to the Bedford truck being somewhat larger and heavier in almost all dimensions, while the Advance Design was ready to be discontinued in the USA. Despite this, the styling was considered fresh in the United Kingdom, a key feature that made the TA very successful.

When the TA was released, it was presented to dealers and large fleet operators that gave the truck positive reviews, and initial sales were much higher than the production capacity at the Bedford factories, so there were shortages and delays in production. During the 1954 model year, some changes included a new bonnet pressing with a raised T-shaped ridge that strengthened the vehicle's overall front end.

The TA series was produced in many versions, including platform trucks, vans, pickup trucks, chassis cabs and ambulances.

In 1957, the TA was modernized and renamed the TD. It was slightly restyled, with the heavier models specifically receiving a different front grille.

It was planned to replace the vehicle with an all new truck, but due to Bedford eventually deciding that the styling was still popular and wanting to focus more on their lighter vans and cab-over trucks, it was decided to just facelift the model and rename it to the TJ series.
