= Bedford TL =

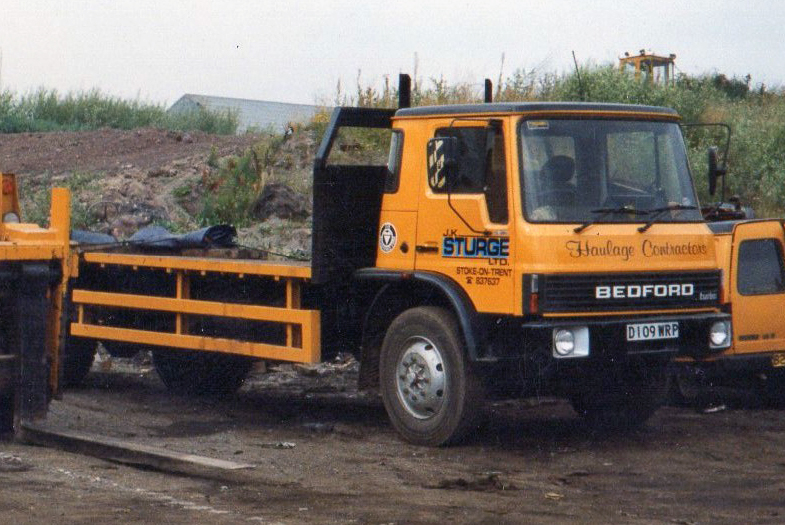

Overview
- Manufacturer: Bedford; AWD
- Also called: AWD TL
- Production: 1980–1986 (Bedford); 1988–1992 (AWD)
- Assembly: Dunstable

Body and chassis
- Class: Commercial vehicle
- Body style: Chassis cab Tipper
- Layout: Longitudinal front engine

Powertrain
- Engine: Bedford; Cummins; Perkins
- Transmission: Eaton; Turner; ZF Friedrichshafen

Dimensions
- Wheelbase: 6x4: 4.45 m (175 in); 6.30 m (248 in)
- Width: 2.50 m (98 in)
- Height: Cab: 2.53 m (100 in)

Chronology
- Predecessor: Bedford TK

The Bedford TL is a truck manufactured by Bedford. Launched in June 1980, the TL was intended to complement the Bedford TK, on which it was heavily based. One of the main advantages of the TL over the TK was the incorporation of a tilt cab, improving maintenance. A tilt cab was a feature of the TK's main competitor, the Ford D series, and had long been seen as a major advantage.

Production began in April 1980, to allow trucks to reach dealers for the premiere. The TL was taken out of production with Bedford's demise in 1986, but production recommenced in 1988 with new owners AWD. The range expanded to include various derivatives before production ceased in 1992 when AWD was placed in receivership.

== History and use ==
The chassis was as for the TK, with some minor alterations at the front to accommodate the new flat-floor cab. The front suspension, now taper leaf sprung, was also new. The TL was designed mainly for short hauls, but comfort was a bigger priority than for the TK. While an ample number of combinations were available, power outputs were higher than for the TK. From launch, the TL was powered by petrol and diesel engines. The six-cylinder petrol power units were the 214P 3.5-litre and the 300P 4.9-litre. The diesel units were the updated versions of the TK's 3.6-litre four-cylinder 220D and the 5.4-litre six-cylinder 330D, with the option for heavier models of the 8.2-litre Blue Series. Power outputs are 83 or 114 hp (62 or 85 kW) for the petrols, while the diesels offer 65 or 98 hp (48 or 73 kW) for the 220D and the 330D. The Blue Series offered either 128 or 151 hp (95 or 113 kW) depending on the model.

By 1984 the engine power was slightly increased with the adoption of turbocharging and the engines were reclassified and now called Red Series. The 3.6-litre 220D was now called the 70TD and the 5.4-litre 330D became the 105TD - the new names signified maximum power outputs. The 8.2-litre Blue Series engines continued in two version; the 130TD and the higher rated 175TD.

When AWD re-launched the TL in 1988, it was equipped with two 6-cylinder engines; initially as the 17-18 model with a Perkins Phaser 180 bhp (134 kW; 182 PS) unit, and from 1990 with the 17–27 with a Cummins C Series 8.3-litre producing 269 bhp (201 kW; 273 PS).
