= Bedford M series =

Bedford M-Series
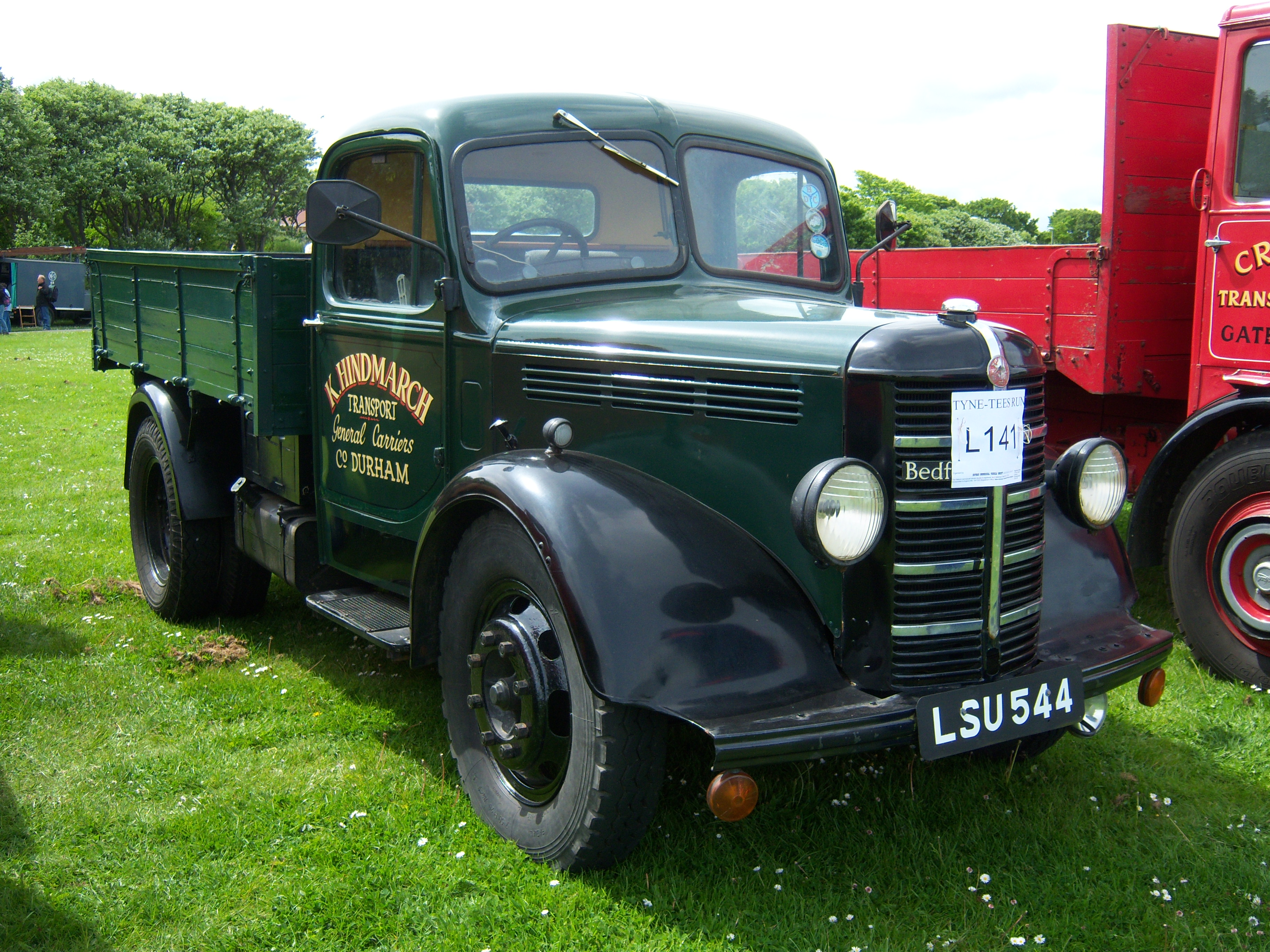

Overview
- Manufacturer: Bedford
- Production: 1939-1953

Body and chassis
- Class: Medium-Duty truck
- Body style: 2-door truck
- Layout: FR layout

Powertrain
- Engine: 214 cu in (3.5 L) OHV 6-cylinder

Chronology
- Predecessor: Bedford WL
- Successor: Bedford TA

The Bedford M series was a line of commercial vehicle chassis, the first variants of which were made in 1939 by Bedford. It is a normal control 4-wheel chassis designed to carry loads of 2-3 tons. There were two wheelbase lengths offered – 10' 0" or 11' 11" – and each was fitted with the standard 6-cylinder 76 bhp petrol engine. A 4-speed gearbox with single dry plate clutch delivered power to a floating rear axle with spiral bevel final drive. Brakes were Lockheed hydraulic type and Clayton Dewandre vacuum assisted operating on all four wheels.

== Variants ==
=== Lorry ===
Seven variants of the M-series chassis were offered. Their designations were:

MS - short (10'0") wheelbase

- MSZ : chassis only
- MSC : chassis and cab
- MSD : dropside lorry
- MST : end tipper

ML - long (11'11") wheelbase

- MLZ : chassis only
- MLC : chassis and cab
- MLD : dropside lorry

=== Bus ===
In the years between the deletion of the WHB small bus in the mid 1930s and the introduction of the Bedford CA, the limited 12–16 seat bus market demand was met by examples of the M series, either MLC or MLZ. Plaxton converted some of the latter to forward control in the 1950s using the same scaled down Consort body as fitted to similar Austin or Karrier buses, whilst an MLC converted to a 12-seat school bus by Lee Motors for Dorset County Council survives in preservation.
