= AWD Trucks =

British truck manufacturer

- Company type: Division
- Industry: Automotive
- Predecessor: Bedford Vehicles
- Founded: 1987; 39 years ago
- Founder: David J.B. Brown
- Defunct: 1992; 34 years ago (AWD Trucks)
- Fate: Merged with Marshall Aerospace and Defence Group in 1992, the Multidrive Vehicles sub-brand is still active though.
- Headquarters: Thirsk, Britain
- Area served: Worldwide
- Products: Military vehicles trucks
- Owner: Caterpillar (for Multidrive Vehicles)
- Parent: Caterpillar
- Website: https://multidrivevehicles.com/ (for Multidrive Vehicles)

AWD Trucks (All Wheel Drive) was a British truck manufacturer that produced Bedford trucks from 1987 to 1992, until it was merged with Marshall Aerospace and Defence Group. The last truck of the company was discontinued in 1998, and so the Bedford name became entirely defunct at that time. There is another British based company called AWD Company Limited Of Camberley in Surrey England an entirely different original brandname who were specialized in developing and manufacturing all wheel driven lorries, earthmoving machinery and other 4WD 6WD roadvehicles founded in 1958 production ended in 1966.

== History ==
In 1986, General Motors decided to sell their Bedford heavy-duty truck division to David J.B. Brown, who was the founder of Artix Limited, while they re-formed the Bedford light truck division into IBC Vehicles. Brown restarted production of the heavy-duty trucks (Bedford TJ, Bedford TK, Bedford MK, Bedford TM and Bedford TL) under the AWD Trucks name in 1987, since the Bedford name was owned by General Motors, but was only used in light vans such as the Bedford Midi and Bedford Rascal, both of which were designs of Suzuki and Isuzu. The now-called AWD Trucks were mostly made for the export market, on which they were very popular, but in Britain, they were only bought by the construction industry and the military.

At that time Brown opened a new firm called Multidrive Vehicles that built 8x6 versions of the AWD TK and AWD TL, mostly for the military and special services. In 1992 the AWD brand was merged with Marshall Aerospace and Defence Group and the only truck that was kept in production was the very outdated Bedford TJ (which was now called AWD TJ), because it was a very good export seller, especially in Pakistan and India, but nevertheless, the production of the truck ended in 1998, and that was the end of the Bedford name. By that time the AWD company had achieved £3 billion of exports and gained 4 Queen's Awards to Industry, with an annual turnover of £400 million.

In 1996 David J.B. Brown sold the Multidrive Vehicles company to Caterpillar. Brown then became a design consultant for the Cat 7 Series ADT. The Bedford trucks that were built by Multidrive Vehicles, were modernized, re-skinned, and were re-badged to Caterpillar vehicles.

These Caterpillar trucks were exported to many countries and were also used in the Gulf War, in Bosnia, Kosovo, and in other countries. The company re-entered the British market in 2001, and also started exports to South Africa that same year. In 2003 the company started producing a whole new range of military vehicles, but the production of the older trucks did not stop. With the death of Brown in 2006, the company was bought by Dr Qu Li.
