= Marshall Group =

Group of defence and aerospace companies

Marshall of Cambridge (Holdings) Limited
- Type: UK Private Limited Company
- Industry: Aerospace & Defence
- Founded: 1 October 1909
- Headquarters: Cambridge City Airport, UK
- Key people: Roger Hardy (Chair); Gareth Williams (CEO Engineering Businesses)
- Products: C-130 maintenance; Deployable infrastructure; Advanced structures; Engineering
- Revenue: £321 million
- Operating income: £4.1 million
- Net income: £1.9 million
- Number of employees: over 2,000
- Website: https://marshallgroup.com/

Marshall Group (registered as Marshall of Cambridge (Holdings) Ltd,) is a British company headquartered in Cambridge, United Kingdom. Subsidiaries include Marshall Aerospace, an aircraft maintenance, modification, and design company located at Cambridge City Airport. Other subsidiaries are Marshall Land Systems (ground defence), Marshall Slingsby Advanced Composites, Marshall Fleet Solutions, Marshall Skills Academy and Marshall Property. Marshall also owns and operates the airport itself.

The company was originally founded by David Gregory Marshall in 1909. Initially operating chauffeur services, the firm soon branched out into vehicle repair and dealership activities. During the 1930s, Marshall became increasingly engaged in aviation; by the end of the Second World War, the company had trained in excess of 20,000 aircrew for service within the Royal Air Force. It was also engaged in repair and modification of military aircraft during the conflict.

During the postwar era, the Marshall companies have been involved in aerospace and special vehicle engineering, with Marshall Aerospace forming a major part of the Marshall Group. The company performs all aspects of design, manufacture, maintenance, modification, conversion and logistic support of military, commercial and business aircraft. Traditionally focused on military customers, Marshall Aerospace has increasingly orientated itself towards the civilian sector in recent decades. It employs over 2,000 people and is based on an 800-acre (3.2 km^{2}) site with 1,200,000 square feet (110,000 m^{2}) of covered Aircraft hangar space on the Cambridge Airport site.

In October 2021, Marshall announced that it had decided to move its Aerospace operations to Cranfield Airport and that "it will leave its current base at Cambridge Airport by 2030". In November 2022, Marshall Aerospace announced that it expects to have left Cambridge Airport "by 2027". In October 2025, the Marshall Group announced that it was reconsidering its plans.

== History ==
=== Early years ===
The Marshall group was originally established during 1909 by its founder David Gregory Marshall, who gave the company his name. Its initial base was a small lock-up garage in Brunswick Gardens, Cambridge, and at first provided chauffeur services to individual customers. It quickly became commercially viable, enabling the business to relocate to larger premises in Kings Street during 1910 and again to Jesus Lane just two years later, expanding its operations to the sale of vehicles shortly thereafter. In 1912, Marshall worked on its first aircraft, helping to repair the engine of a British Army airship, the Beta II, which had made an emergency landing on Jesus Green, a park near its garage. During the First World War, Marshall's premises were engaged in the servicing and repair of vehicles required for the British war effort.

During the late 1920s, David Marshall's son, Arthur, took an active role in the company. A keen engineer and pilot, Arthur was involved in establishing an aerodrome at Fen Ditton on the outskirts of Cambridge. During 1930, the Marshall Flying School was formed at Fen Ditton, marking the company's entry into the aviation sector. During the 1930s, Marshall purchased a large amount of farmland, using some of it to establish what would become Cambridge City Airport, which was larger and with greater facilities than its predecessor. Formally opened in 1937, the new airport was fortuitously timed with a coinciding national priority on rearmament, which included the training of military aircrew. Accordingly, in 1938, a major flying training school for the Royal Air Force Volunteer Reserve was established by Marshall; it had reportedly trained over 600 new RAF pilots prior to the start of the Battle of Britain. The scheme was ramped up during the Second World War; the company ultimately trained in excess of 20,000 aircrew, including pilots, observers and flying instructors. During 1941, the training scheme was universally adopted by the Royal Air Force (RAF).

Prior to the war, Marshall had opened a second garage, known as "Airport Garage", on the site; both garages were temporarily closed down during the conflict and were reopened shortly after its end. In the meantime, the company engaged in the repair and modification of military aircraft. Marshall performed work on over 5,000 aircraft, ranging in size and complexity from Airspeed Oxford and Avro Anson transport aircraft to front-line combat types as the de Havilland Mosquito, Supermarine Spitfire, Hawker Hurricane, Vickers Wellington and Boeing B-17 Flying Fortress. To cope with this workload, the firm's workforce was expanded to around 3,000 employees, many of which were women. Marshall chose to continue its involvement in aviation work, such as repairs, structural modifications and conversions, even after the war's end, although it mostly abandoned its final assembly work. Instead, the firm operated as a sub-contractor of virtually all the British aircraft manufacturing companies.

=== Postwar ===
Marshall Motor Group rapidly flourished in the postwar era; various new garages were soon established to serve Peterborough, Bedford, and neighbouring smaller towns. During the 1950s and 1960s, the firm found work in modifying hundreds of various civil airliners, including the Vickers Viscount, the first turboprop airliner, and de Havilland Comets, the first jet-powered airliner, and the Bristol Britannia. Marshall was also involved with the National Research Development Corporation, assisting Francis Thomas Bacon in the invention of the fuel cell. Around this time, Michael Marshall became the company's CEO. He managed the company for several decades, during which time it became one of the largest privately owned businesses in Britain.

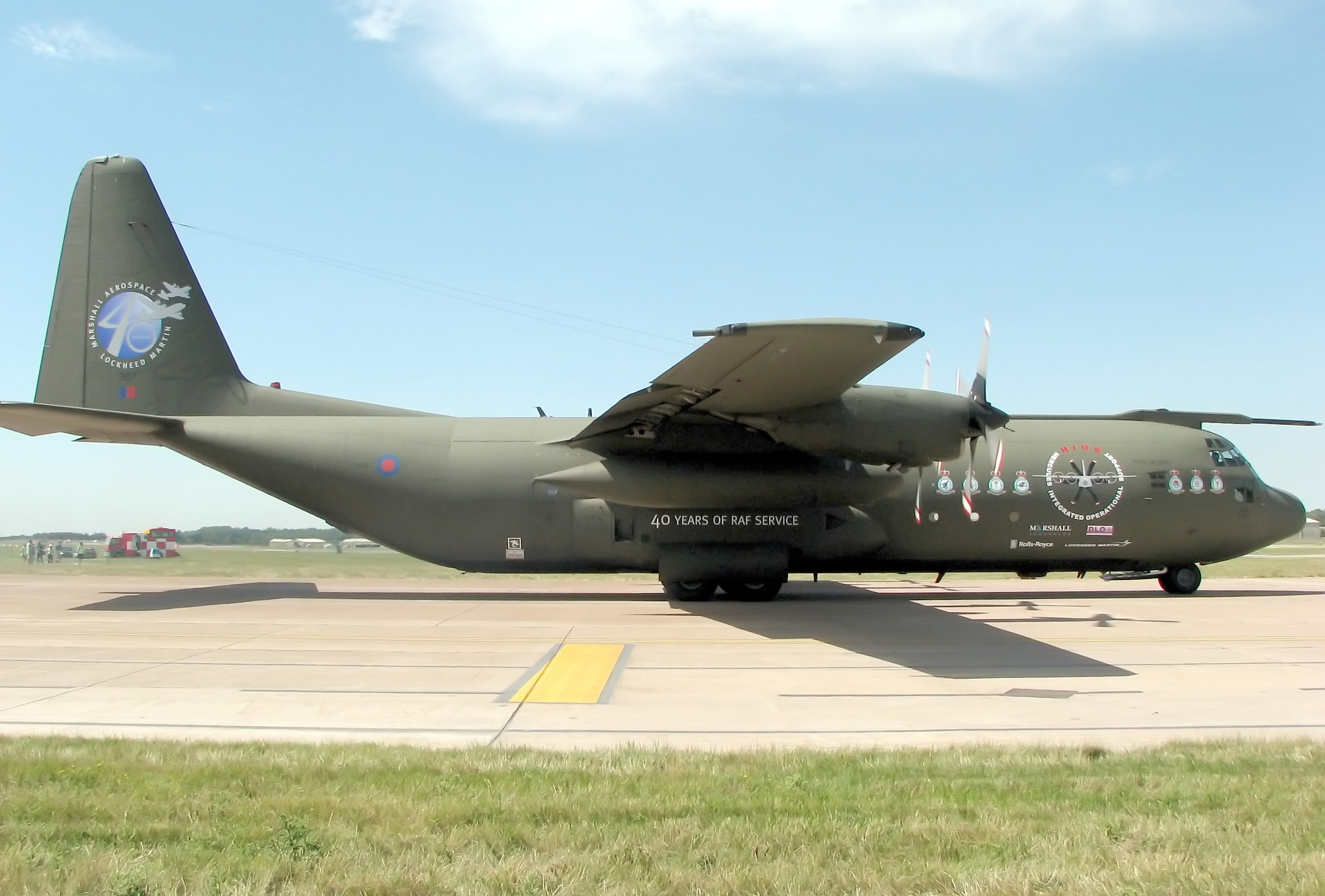
Royal Air Force Hercules C-130K (C3) in commemorative Hercules Integrated Operational Support Colour Scheme.

From 1966, Marshall Aerospace was the designated support company for the Royal Air Force's fleet of C-130 Hercules. It was formally recognised as a Sister Design Authority for the type since 1988. The company oversaw the introduction of RAF's 25 second generation C-130J Super Hercules fleet, as well as the retirement of half of the service's first generation aircraft. In addition to its domestic support operations, Marshall Aerospace has supported various international operators' own Hercules fleets. Marshall Group has also signed multiple agreements with US defence conglomerate Lockheed Martin to manufacture various components of the Super Hercules on behalf of the latter's for the global supply chain.

Marshall Aerospace functioned as the design authority for the RAF's fleet of Lockheed TriStar tanker and freighter aircraft; as well as the appointed sister design authority for the RAF's Boeing E-3D Sentry. It undertook major maintenance and modification activity on these types, plus a range of other military and commercial aircraft. Notable design achievements include the design and production of Concorde's droop nose and visor in 1967, and a vestibular sled for medical research which flew 112 orbits in Space Shuttle Challenger on STS-61-A in 1985. Marshall Aerospace has also performed a variety of passenger to tanker and freighter aircraft conversions. One unusual project was the conversion of a Lockheed L-1011 Tristar airliner into a launch vehicle for a satellite delivery system, on behalf of Orbital Sciences. Marshall Aerospace was the designated industrial body involved in the Vulcan to the Sky project, which restored Avro Vulcan XH558 to a flight-worthy condition and supported its operations for numerous years.

In 1992, Marshall bought AWD Trucks. Production in that subsidiary ended in 1998.

Marshall Group has been a long-term partner of Bombardier Aerospace. During 1998, the company was appointed the first independent authorised service centre in Europe for the Bombardier Global Express long-range business jet. In mid 2000, Marshall became involved in the Global Express' manufacturing process, performing interior completions on behalf of Bombardier. During the 2010s, the firm's expertise with the type enabled it to perform extensive modifications of the airframe to produce customised special mission models for military customers. Marshall Aerospace has also performed the production of long range fuel tanks for various Boeing aircraft, including the Boeing 747-400ER and 777-200LR airliners, as well as the P-8 Poseidon multi-mission maritime aircraft.

By 2012, the Marshall Group was reporting an annual turnover in excess of £1 billion and was employing nearly 4,500 staff. During the 2010s, the business made various moves to expand its footprint in commercial aviation, announcing its intention to establish Cambridge Airport as a primary hub for business aviation operations during 2012. In September 2013, Marshall purchased Hawker Beechcraft's services branch at Broughton, subsequently rebranding it Marshall Aviation Services as well as being appointed Hawker's distributor for the UK, Ireland and Scandinavia. That same year, the company also bought FlairJet, an air charter specialist. This move was part of Marshall's strategy to grow its charter fleet five-fold. At this time, Marshall Group was deliberately restructuring its business activities, particularly its sizeable aerospace division.

During late 2015, Marshall Group announced that, in response to a downturn in demand from the British armed forces, the firm intended to focus on its growing civilian activities, including the resumption of VIP aircraft conversion work to counteract this. During 2019, the company announced that was planning to relocate its headquarters from its historic home at Cambridge Airport over the coming decade, although it noted there was value in relocating to a nearby location, such as Cranfield Airport, Duxford Aerodrome and RAF Wyton.

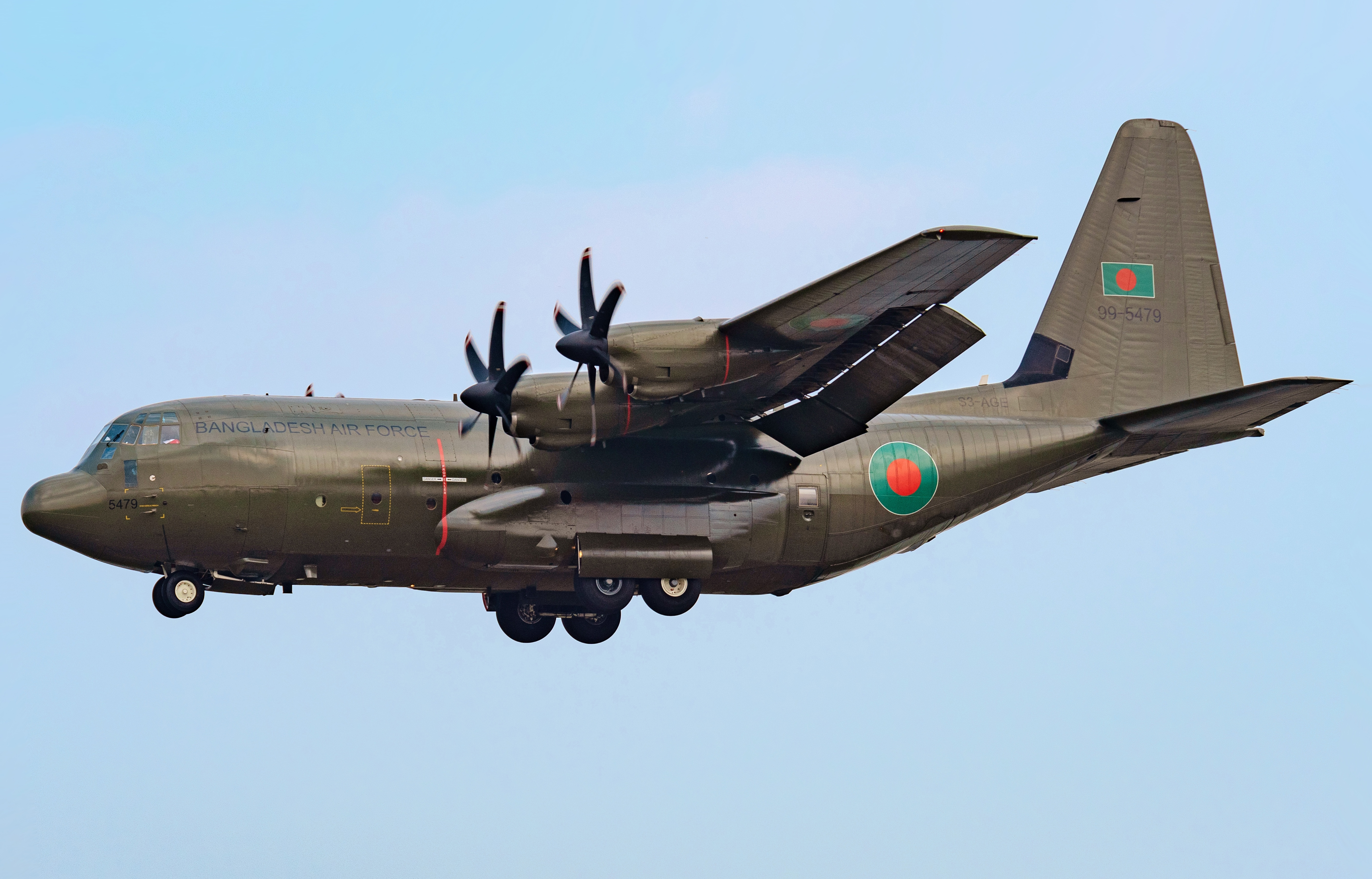
Bangladesh Air Force C-130J modified by Marshall ADG

Marshall carried out depth maintenance and modified C-130J Super Hercules fleet of Bangladesh Air Force before delivered to Bangladesh. Those were ex RAF aircraft. Marshall also signed a multi-year multi-million-pound support contract for the C-130J fleet.

== Activities ==
Marshall's headquarters is located on an 800-acre site in Cambridge, UK. The group operates worldwide in the fields of aerospace, military land systems and fleet management; the company also cooperated with 67 franchised automotive dealerships across the UK by 2012.

Marshall Aerospace has been involved with all levels of aircraft maintenance, modification and conversion for more than seventy years. The company has the authorisation and experience to work on a range of aircraft from Cessna Citations to Boeing 747s in civil use, and Lockheed C-130 Hercules and Lockheed L-1011 TriStars for the military. Marshall Aerospace carries out maintenance from routine daily maintenance to a full aircraft depot level checks. All forms of conversions, re-configurations, modifications and repairs can be designed and implemented by Marshall Aerospace. The company's commercial aircraft hangar can house a range of different aircraft, for example, one Boeing 747-400, one McDonnell Douglas MD-11 and two Airbus A320s. Marshall also has other hangar space that can hold up to 12 C-130s at a time. Amongst the various facilities it has, the firm possesses the largest quiet test building in Europe.

The company has a long history of rapid response to customers, an example being the complete repaint of a Tristar at Cambridge on 16 January 1991; it was repainted in "desert colours" overnight and flown back to the Gulf for operations on 17 January 1991, the first full day of Operation Desert Storm. During the 2010s, Marshall Aerospace opened a new main paint bay, which it claimed to be one of the largest in Europe, being big enough to accommodate an entire Boeing 747.

Besides aerospace, Marshall operates other divisions in a diverse range of fields. Marshall Group Properties owns Cambridge City Airport, where the company has its main base, and a large portion of the land surrounding it. Over the years, it has embarked on various development projects to expand the airport's facilities and build thousands of homes nearby. The airport itself has been owned and operated by the company since 1937.

== Planned relocation ==
In May 2019, Marshall announced that Cambridge City Airport would be closed to all traffic by 2030 at the latest. The Group plans to redevelop the airport site for around 12,000 homes and 5 million sq ft (0.46 million m^{2}) of business premises. In May 2019, the Group announced that it was deciding between three potential airfields for its continuing operations: Duxford Aerodrome, RAF Wyton in Cambridgeshire, or Cranfield Airport in Bedfordshire. In January 2020 the Group ruled out moving to Duxford due to incompatibility between the defence requirements of the Group and the requirements of the local traffic.

On 6 October 2020, Cranfield University and MADG announced that they had signed an option agreement for the potential relocation of Marshall Aerospace to Cranfield Airport. A spokesperson for MADG cautioned that "the signing of the option agreement does not represent a final decision". In October 2021, the Group announced that it had decided in favour of the Cranfield option and that "it will leave its current base at Cambridge Airport by 2030". Outline planning permission for the development at Cranfield was granted in April 2023.

In October 2025, the Marshall Group announced that it was to abandon the proposed move, considering it "unaffordable" after having made a loss of $55M in 2024: it is "actively exploring a number of alternative options".
