= Chevrolet Advance Design =

Chevrolet Advance-Design Series
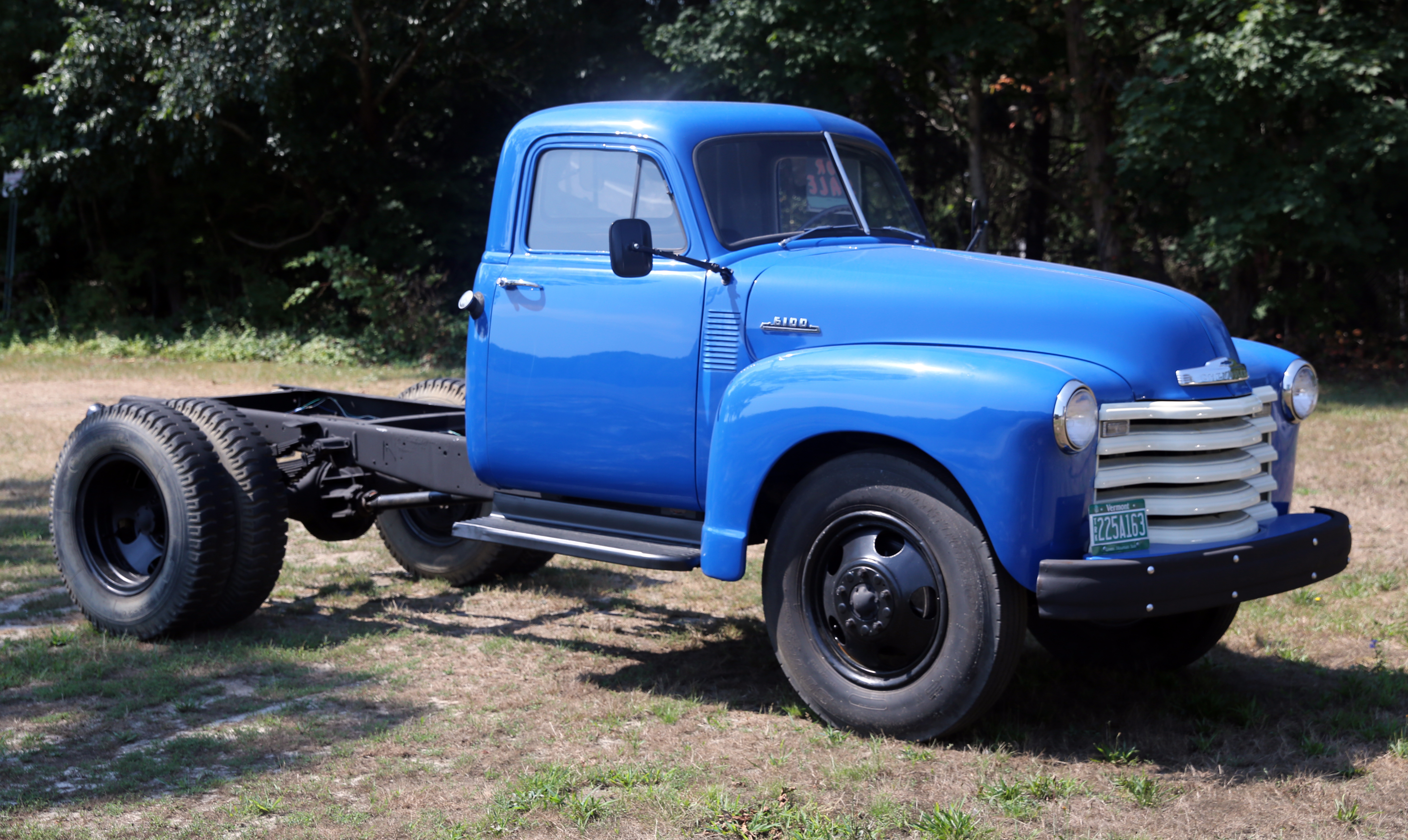
- 1953 Chevrolet 6100 (Advanced Design)

Overview
- Manufacturer: Chevrolet (General Motors)
- Also called: Chevrolet 3100 (1/2-ton); Chevrolet 3600 (3/4-ton); Chevrolet 3800 (1-ton); Chevrolet 4400; Chevrolet 6100; Chevrolet Loadmaster; Chevrolet Thriftmaster; GMC New Design
- Production: 1947–1955
- Assembly: United States: Baltimore Assembly (Baltimore, Maryland); Flint Truck Assembly (Flint, Michigan); Janesville Assembly Plant (Janesville, Wisconsin); Lakewood Assembly, Lakewood Heights (Atlanta, Georgia); Leeds Assembly, Leeds (Kansas City, Missouri); Norwood Assembly (Norwood, Ohio); Oakland Assembly (Oakland, California: Chevrolet and GMC); Pontiac West Assembly (Pontiac, Michigan: GMC only); St. Louis Truck Assembly (St. Louis, Missouri: Chevrolet and GMC); North Tarrytown Assembly North Tarrytown, New York; Van Nuys Assembly (Van Nuys, California)

Body and chassis
- Class: Pickup truck
- Body style: 2-door truck 2-door panel truck 2-door station wagon (Suburban)
- Layout: FR layout
- Platform: GM A platform
- Related: Chevrolet Suburban

Powertrain
- Engine: 216 cu in (3.5 L) I6 (1947–1953); 235 cu in (3.9 L) I6 (1954–1955); 261 cu in (4.3 L) I6 (1954–1955)
- Transmission: 3-/4-speed manual; 4-speed Hydramatic automatic (1954–1955)

Dimensions
- Wheelbase: 116 in (2,946 mm); 125.25 in (3,181 mm); 137 in (3,480 mm)
- Length: 3100: 196.6–232.3 in (4,990–5,900 mm) (1947–1952); 191.3–233.2 in (4,860–5,920 mm) (1953–1955)
- Curb weight: 3,286–5,530 lb (1,491–2,508 kg)

Chronology
- Predecessor: Chevrolet AK Series
- Successor: Chevrolet Task Force

The Advance-Design is a light and medium-duty truck series sold by Chevrolet, their first major redesign after World War II. Its GMC counterpart was the GMC New Design. It was billed as a larger, stronger, and sleeker design in comparison to the earlier AK Series. First available on June 28, 1947, these trucks were sold with various minor changes over the years until March 25, 1955, when the Task Force Series trucks replaced the Advance-Design model.

The same basic design family was used for all of its trucks, including the Suburban, panel trucks, canopy express, and cab overs. The cab-overs used the same basic cab configuration and similar grille, but had a shorter, taller hood and different fenders. The unique cab-over fenders and hood required a custom cowl area, which made cab-over engine cabs incompatible with normal truck cabs while all truck cabs of all weights interchanged.

From 1947 until 1955, Chevrolet trucks were number one in sales in the United States, with rebranded versions sold at GMC locations.

While General Motors used this front-end sheet metal (and, to a slightly lesser extent, the cab) on all of its trucks except for the cab overs, there are three main sizes of this truck: the half-, three-quarter-, and full-ton capacities in short and long wheelbase.

== Differences ==
1947 - Gasoline tank filler neck on passenger side of bed. No vent windows in doors. Hood side emblems read "Chevrolet" with "Thriftmaster" or "Loadmaster" underneath. Serial numbers: EP 1/2 ton, ER 3/4 ton, & ES 1 ton. Radios were first available in Chevrolet trucks as an "in dash" option on the "Advance-Design" body style.

1948 - Manual transmission shifter now mounted on column instead of floor. Serial numbers codes: FP 1/2 ton, FR 3/4 ton, & FS 1 ton.

Early 1949 - Gasoline tank now mounted upright behind seat in cab; filler neck aft of passenger door handle. New serial number codes: GP 1/2 ton, GR 3/4 ton, & GS 1 ton.

Late 1949 - Hood side emblems no longer read "Thriftmaster" or "Loadmaster", but are now numbers that designate cargo capacity: 3100 on 1/2 ton, 3600 on 3/4 ton, 3800 on 1 ton. Serial number codes remain the same as on early 1949.

1950 - Telescopic shock absorbers replace lever-action type. Last year for driver's side cowl vent, its handle is now flat steel, not maroon knob as in previous years. New serial number codes: HP 1/2 ton, HR 3/4 ton, & HS 1 ton.

1951 - Doors now have vent windows. Mid-year change from a 9-board bed to an 8-board bed. Last year for 80 mph speedometer, chrome window handle knobs, and chrome wiper knob. New serial number codes: JP 1/2 ton, JR 3/4 ton, & JS 1 ton.

1952 - Outer door handles are now push button type as opposed to the previous turn down style. Speedometer now reads 90 mph instead of 80 and dashboard trim is color-matched instead of chrome. Mid-year, Chevrolet stopped applying the 3100-6400 designations on the hood and changed to maroon window and wiper knobs. New serial number codes: KP 1/2 ton, KR 3/4 ton, & KS 1 ton.

1953 - Last year for the 216 in^{3} inline-six. Hood side emblems now only read 3100, 3600, 3800, 4400, or 6400 in large print. Door post ID plate now blue with silver letters (previous models used black with silver letters). Last year to use wooden blocks as bed supports. New serial number codes: H 1/2 ton, J 3/4 ton, & L 1 ton.

1954 - Only year for significant design changes. Windshield now curved one-piece glass without center vertical dividing strip. Revised steering wheel. Revised dashboard. Cargo bed rails, previously angled, now horizontal. Tail lights round instead of rectangular. Grille changed from five horizontal slats to crossbar design commonly referred to as a "bull nose" grille, similar to modern Dodge truck grilles. New engines are now 235-cubic inch straight-6 and 261-cubic inch straight-6. Serial number codes unchanged from 1953. Hydramatic automatic transmission and a new 2 ton 6500 model became available for the first time, the former as a paid for option.

1955 First Series - Similar to the 1954 model year, except redesigned hood-side emblems and modern open driveshaft in place of enclosed torque tube. Serial number codes unchanged from 1953 and 1954.

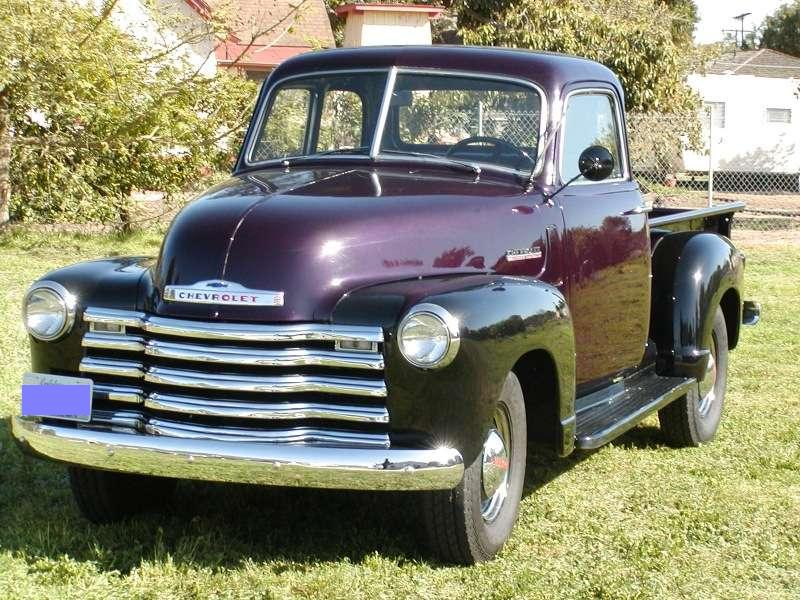
1948 Chevrolet Thriftmaster pickup truck

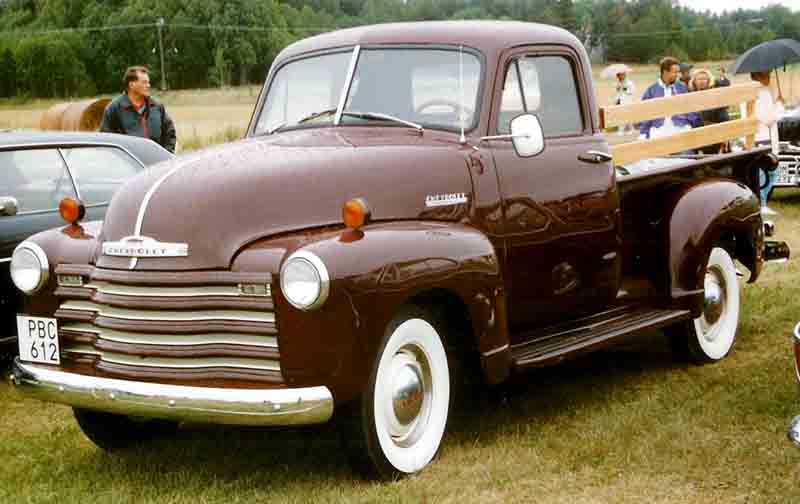
1951 Chevrolet Advance Design

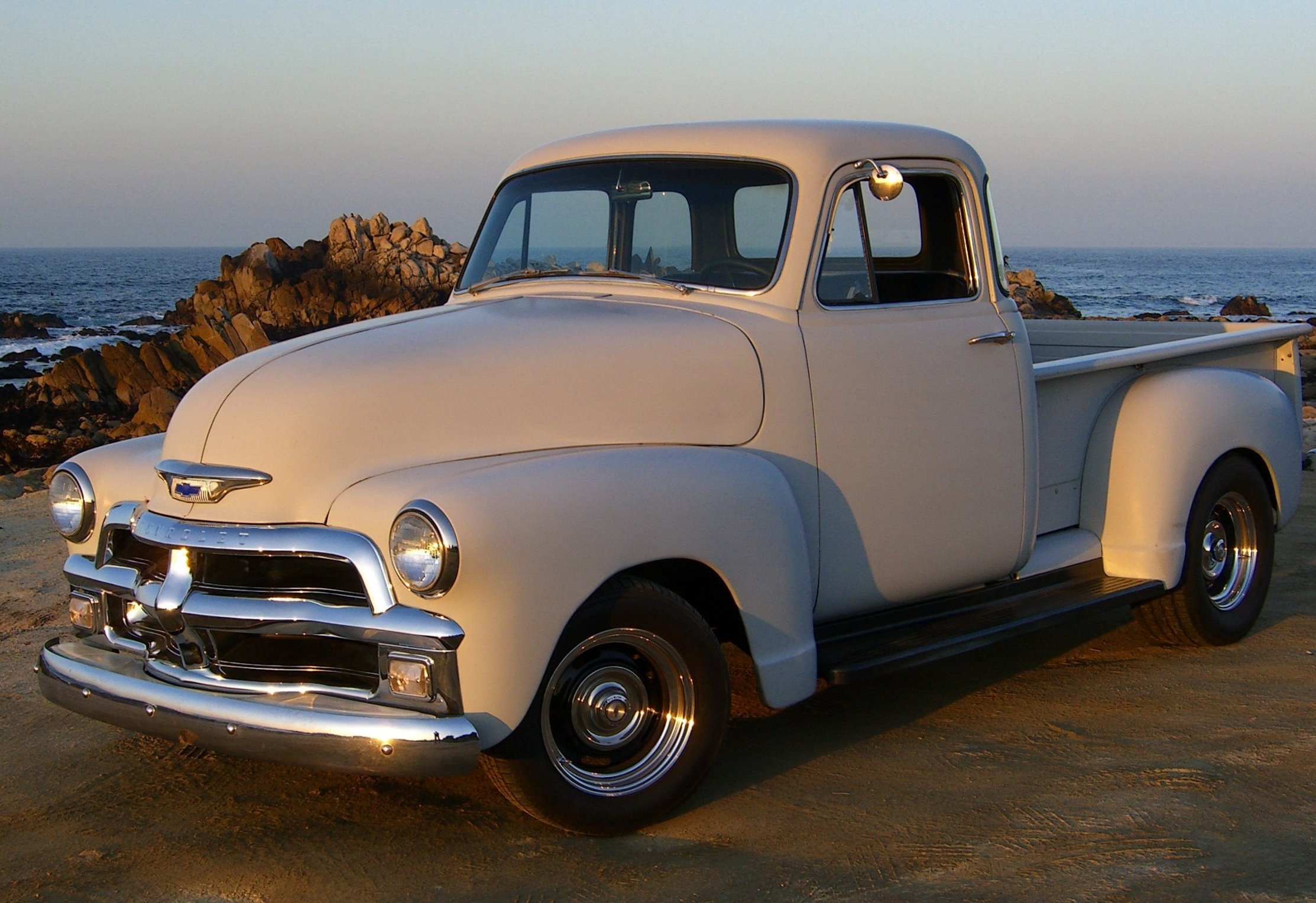
1954 Chevrolet 3100

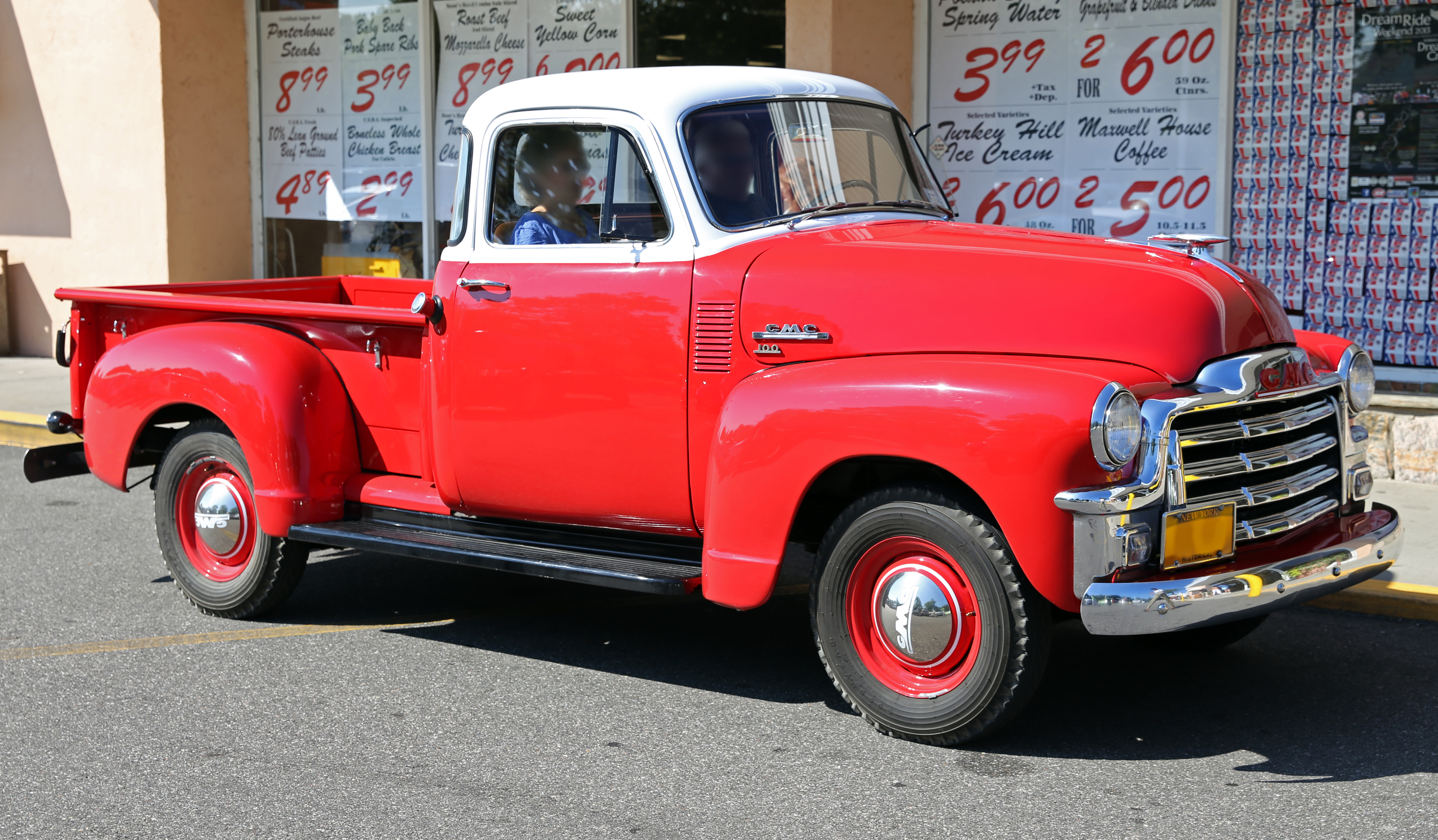
1954 GMC 100

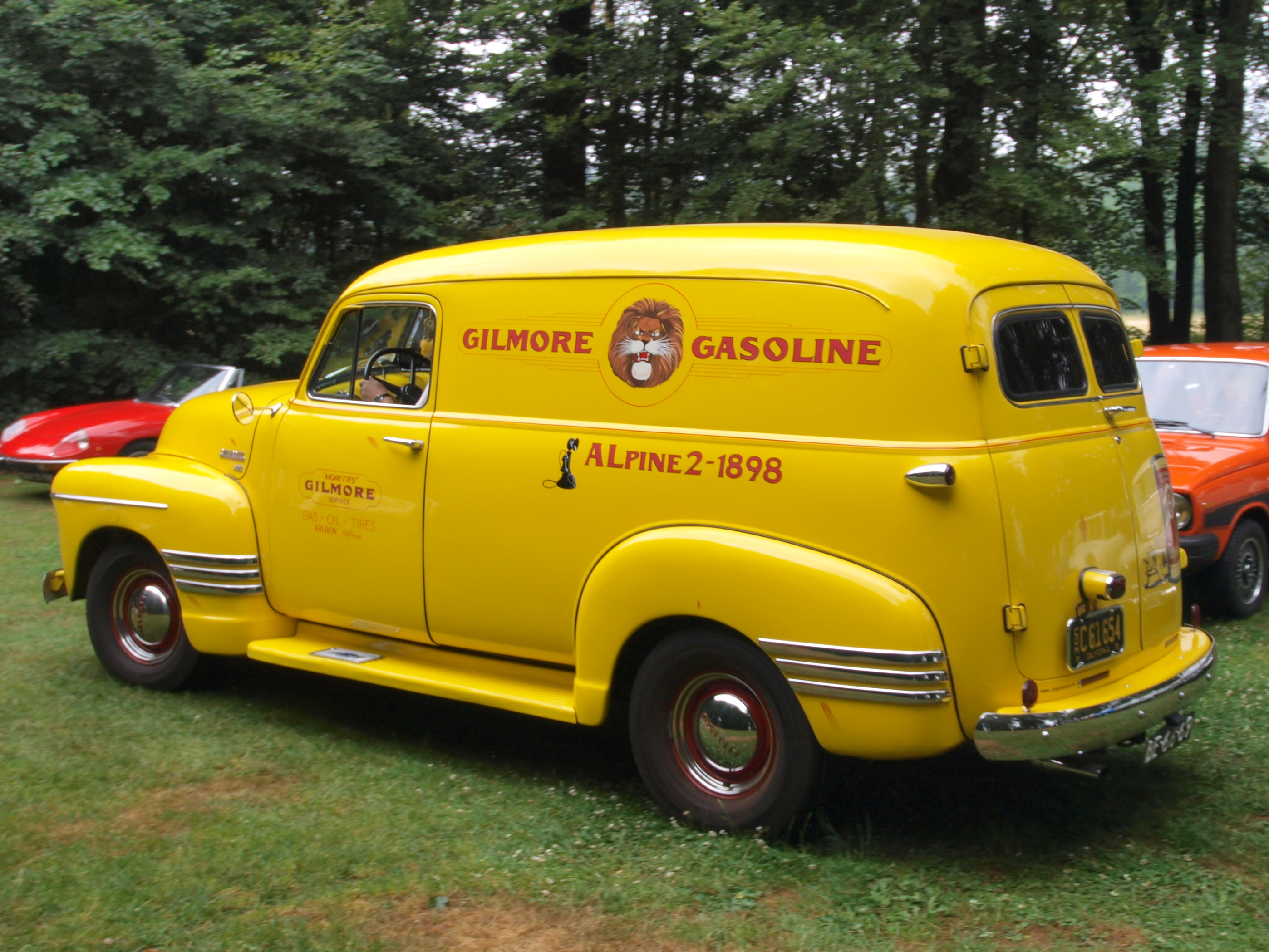
1951 Chevrolet 3100 panel van

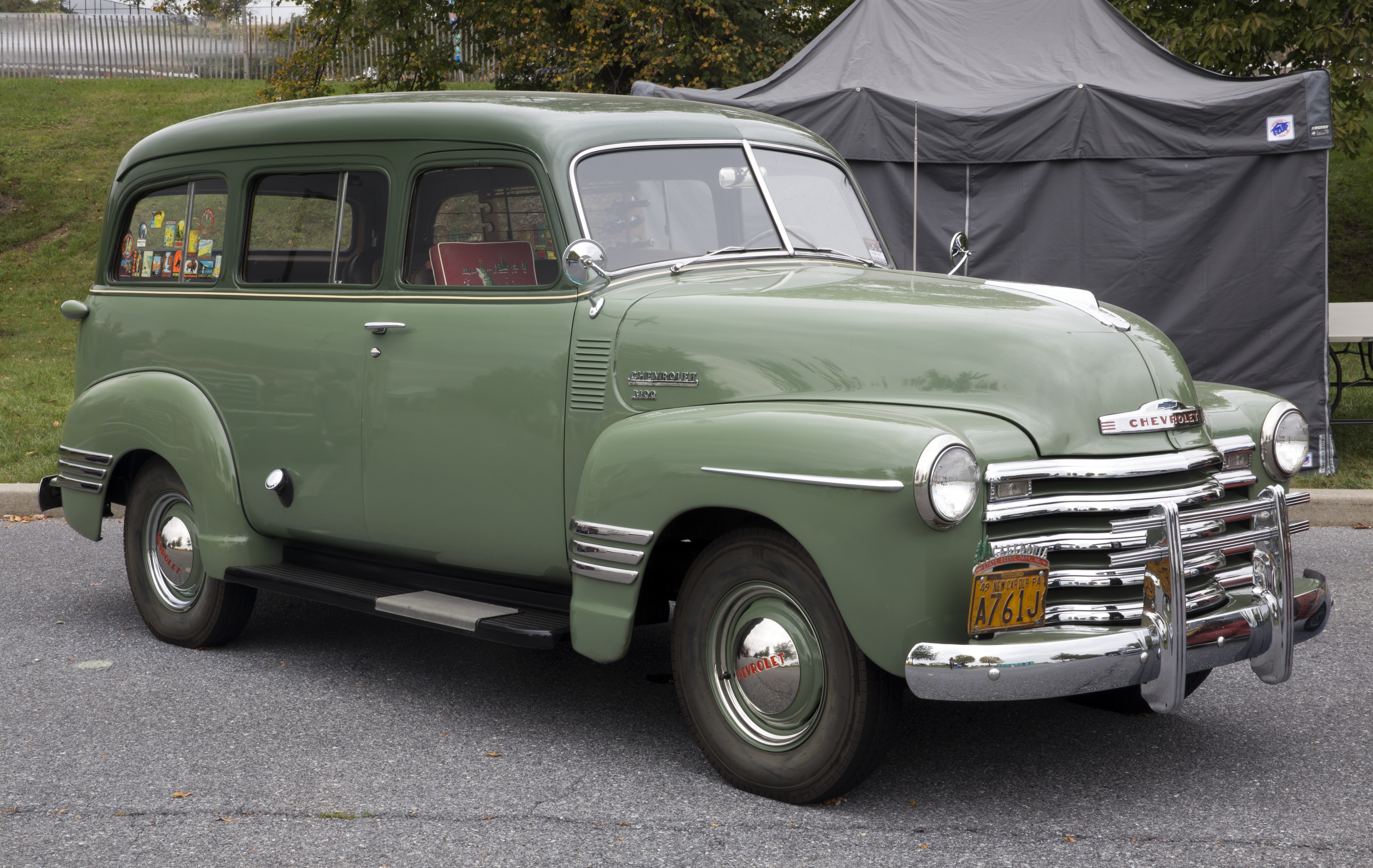
1949 Chevrolet Suburban

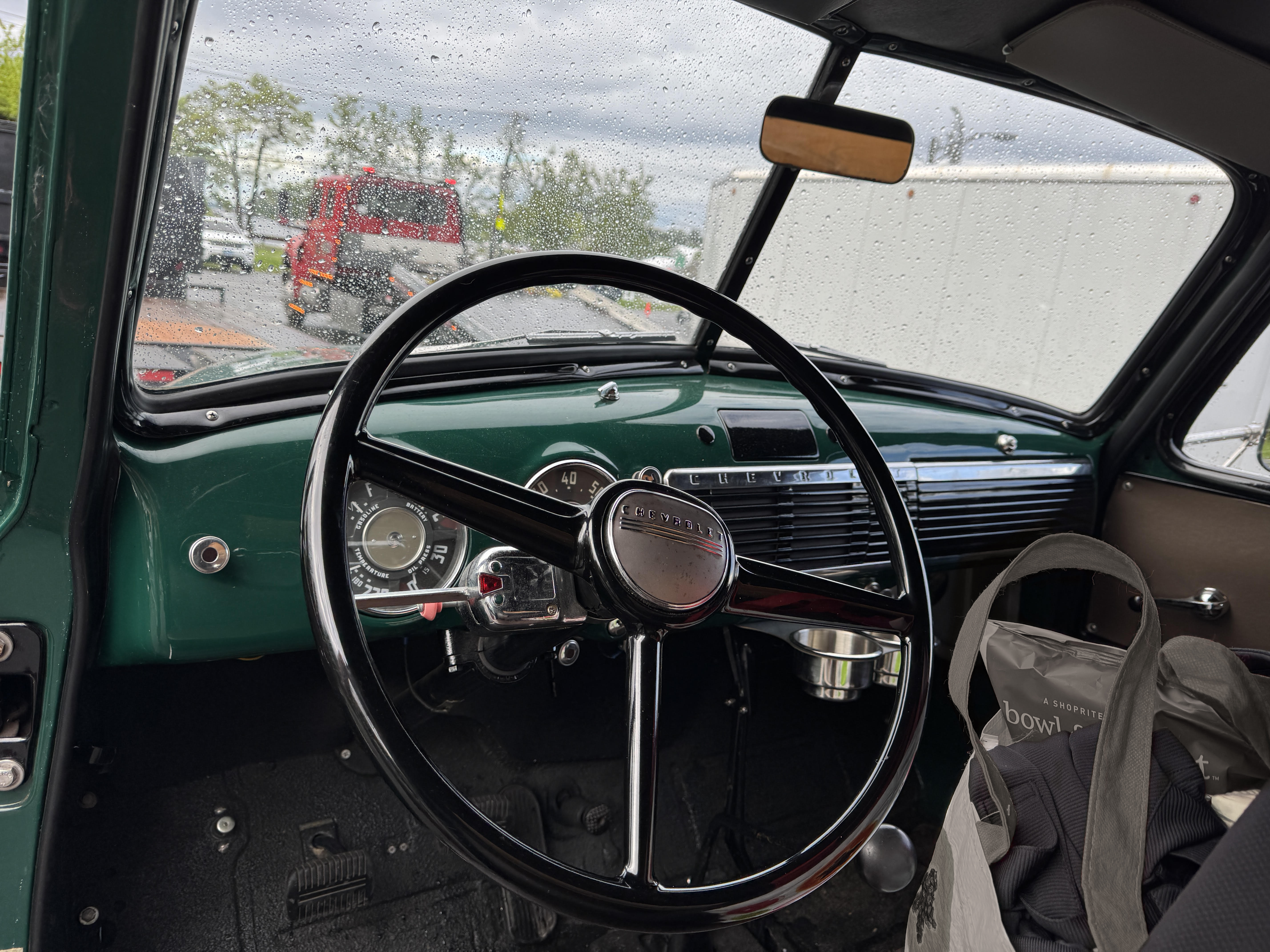
Interior (1950 Chevrolet 4400)

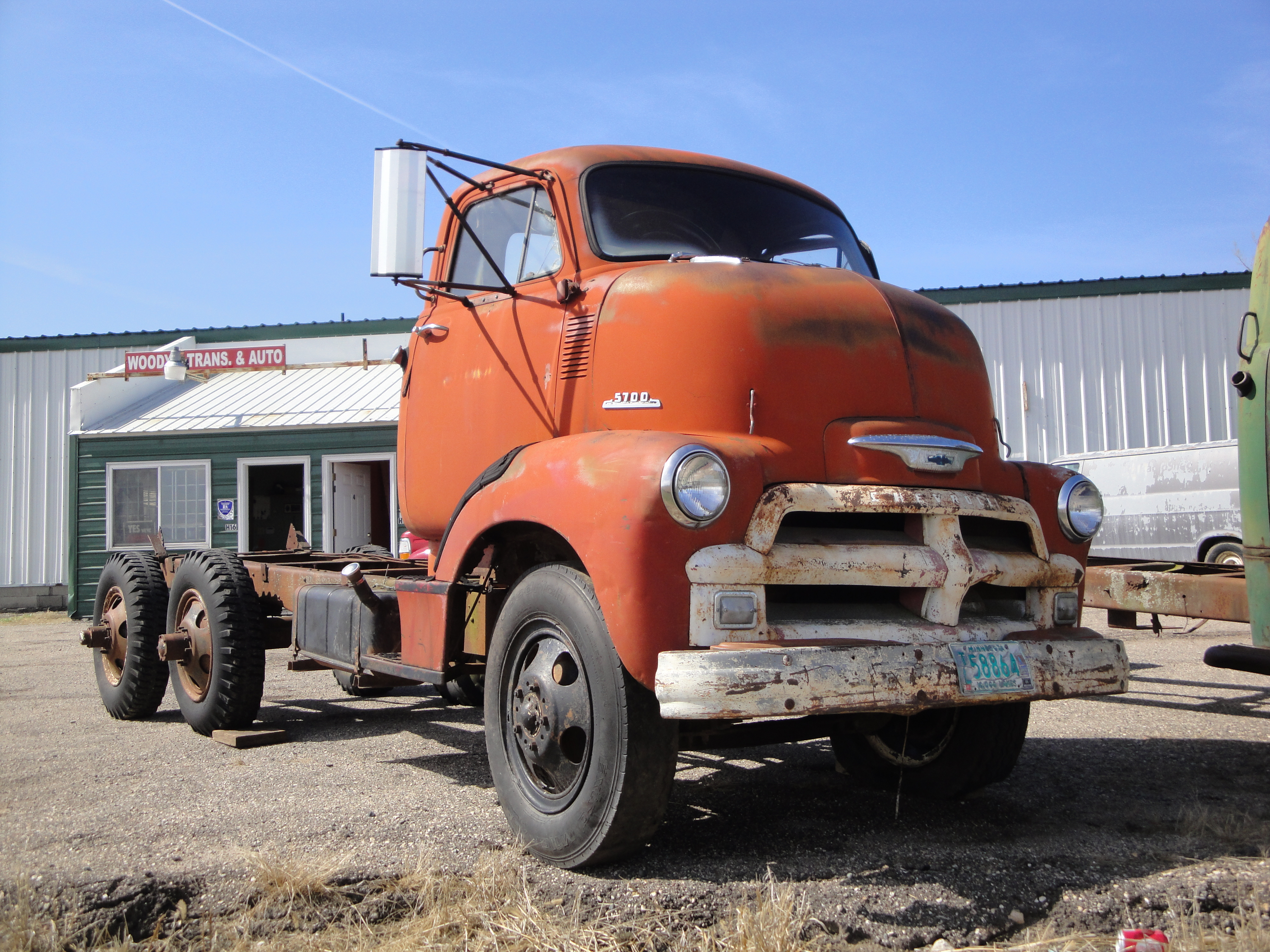
1954 Chevrolet 5700 Cab Over Engine

Buc-ee's plushies in a vintage Chevrolet truck

== GMC HC-Series ==
GM HC-Series
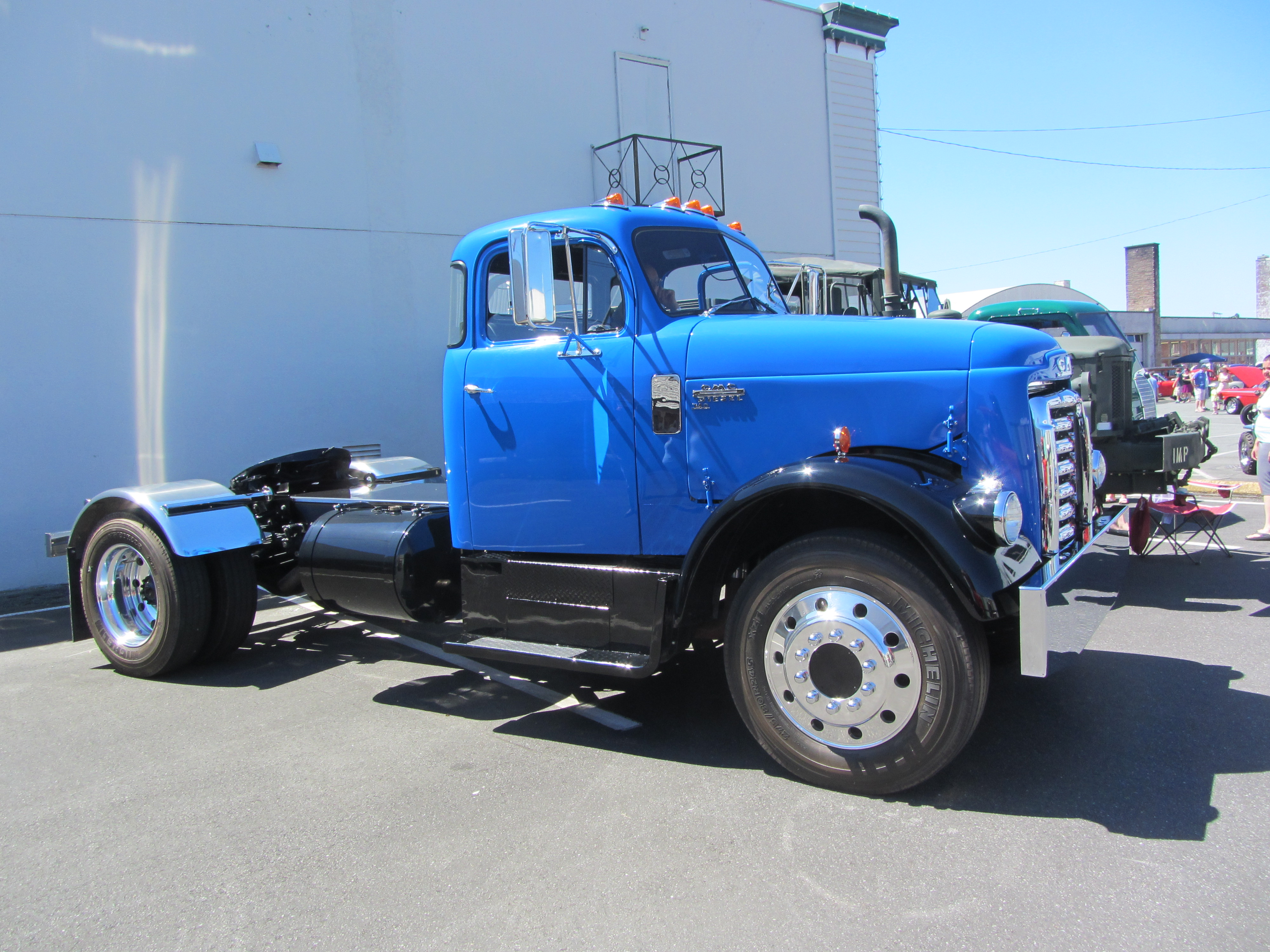
- GM HC-Series

Overview
- Model years: 1949–1958

Powertrain
- Engine: 302 cu in (4.9 L) I6; 503 cu in (8.2 L) I6; Detroit Diesel 4-71; Detroit Diesel 6-71

Dimensions
- Wheelbase: 116–201 in (2,946–5,105 mm)
- Length: 191–322 in (4,851–8,179 mm)

Chronology
- Successor: GMC F/D "Crackerbox" (HF-Series models only)

The GMC HC-Series is a medium/heavy-duty version of the GMC New Design truck. The HC was available as both a flatbed truck and semi-truck. These HC-Series trucks had a narrower hood and fenders compared to their lighter GMC New Design counterparts.

Mating the smaller pick-up truck cab with a much larger heavier-duty chassis and air brakes, the HC had a 27,000 or 55,000 lb (12,000 or 25,000 kg) GCW depending on the version of the truck. A cab-over version based on the HC-Series was also produced, under the HF-Series name, although it was popularly nicknamed the Cannonball, after a TV series featuring it. It continued until 1958, when it was replaced by the GMC F/D "Crackerbox".

== Styling legacy ==
With the truck proving to be very popular in the United States, the same "Advance-Design" styling was used on other trucks made overseas by General Motors' divisions such as Opel and Vauxhall. Both the redesigned 1952 Opel Blitz and 1953 Bedford A-Type were stylistically heavily based on the Advance Design truck.

During the retro craze of the 2000s, the style of the Advance Design was used for the 2003-2006 Chevrolet SSR roadster pickup and later for the 2006-2011 Chevrolet HHR crossover SUV.
