= Bedford S type =

Bedford S Type
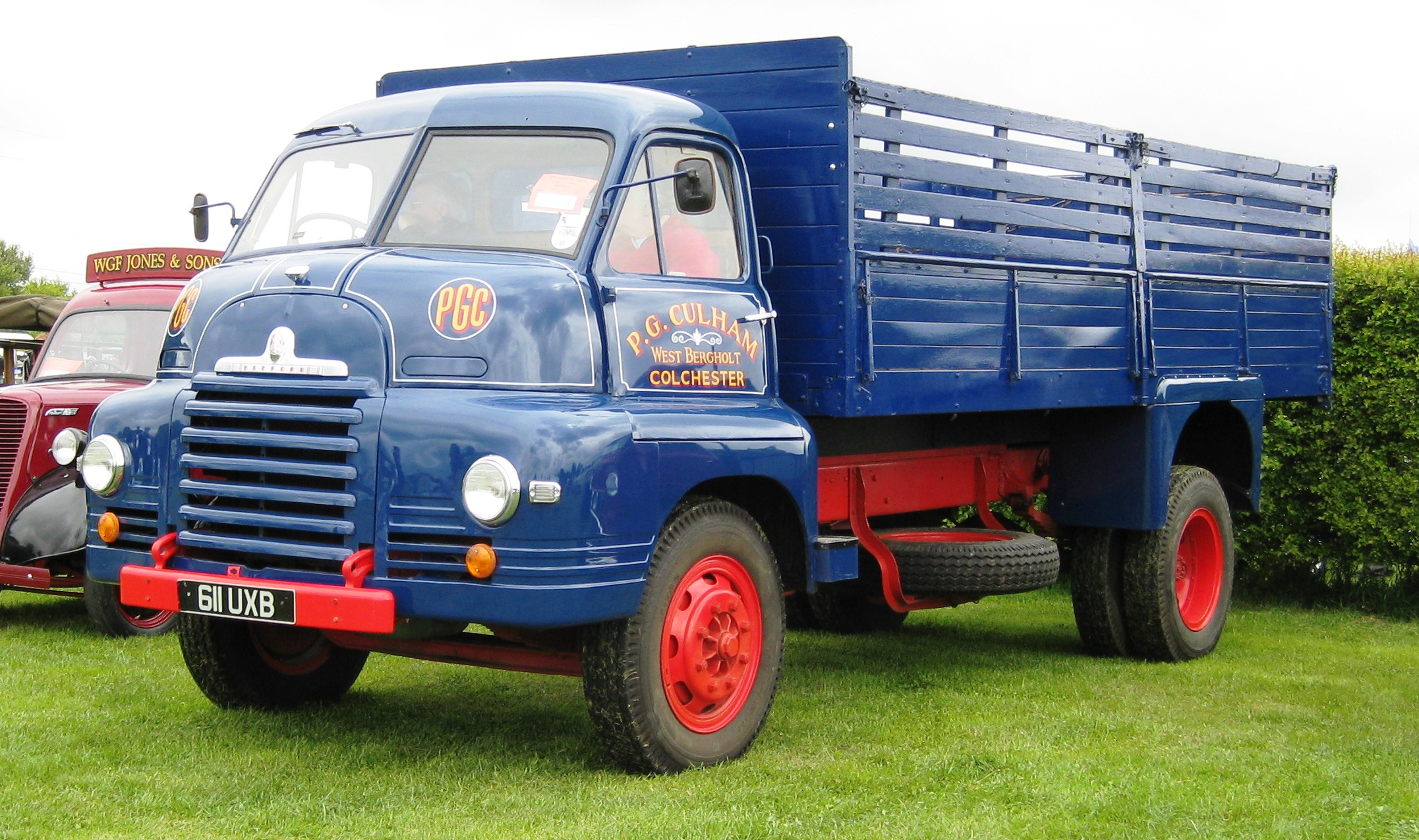
- 1954 S type

Overview
- Manufacturer: Bedford Vehicles
- Production: 1950–1959

Body and chassis
- Layout: FR
- Related: Bedford SB; Bedford RL

Powertrain
- Engine: Bedford I6 petrol Perkins R6 diesel Leyland O.350 diesel Bedford diesel
- Transmission: 4-speed manual

Dimensions
- Wheelbase: 86 in (2,180 mm); 116 in (2,950 mm); 156 in (3,960 mm)

Chronology
- Successor: Bedford TK

The Bedford S is a heavy lorry produced in Great Britain between 1950 and 1959. Launched at the Commercial Vehicle Show in 1950, it was the largest Bedford lorry available at the time. Originally available only with a 110 bhp (82 kW) petrol engine, a diesel was added in 1953. The lorry proved popular amongst haulers and general traders, for fire engines, and was used for the first liquid egg tanker in 1966.

== Description ==
The S was a conventional lorry and available in three wheelbases, 86 in (2,180 mm), 116 in (2,950 mm) and 156 in (3,960 mm). At introduction, the lorry was fitted with a 4.92 L (300 cu in) 6-cylinder Bedford petrol engine that produced 110 bhp (82 kW) at 3200 rpm. Drive was through a four-speed manual gearbox featuring synchromesh on the top three gears, and final drive in the rear axle was by hypoid gears. The 5.56 L (339 cu in) Perkins R6 diesel engine was made an option in 1953, soon joined by the 5.76 L (351 cu in) Leyland O.350, and Bedford's own diesel in 1957. These were rated at between 90 and 104 bhp (67 and 78 kW).

== History ==
The S was launched at the Commercial Vehicle Show in 1950. Known as the "Big Bedford", it was the largest Bedford lorry available at the time, with a gross vehicle weight of 7 long tons (7,100 kg). The Bedford S was used extensively by haulers and general trades through the 1950s and 1960s. The chassis was used for fire engines and, in 1966, to carry the first liquid egg tanker. The vehicle was the basis for the Bedford RL all-wheel-drive transport that served in large numbers with the British Army. The Bedford SB bus also used a chassis derived from the S.

== See also ==
- Bedford RL
- Green Goddess
