= Operation Candid =

Cold War plan to evacuate the British royal family in case of nuclear attack

- Part of the Cold War
- Type: Contingency plan
- Planned by: British Government
- Objective: To evacuate Queen Elizabeth II, the Duke of Edinburgh and other members of the British royal family in the event of nuclear war
- Date: 1962

Operation Candid: Protection of the Royal Family in an Emergency was a Cold War contingency plan of the British Government to evacuate Queen Elizabeth II, the Duke of Edinburgh and other members of the British royal family from London in the event of nuclear war. The plan was devised in late 1962 following the Cuban Missile Crisis and approved the following year.

== History ==
During a time of crisis a Royal Duties Force would be formed. The force would be around 1,300 officers and men consisting of a reinforced battalion from one of the five regiments of Foot Guards, a reinforced squadron of the Household Cavalry equipped with armoured cars, a medical detachment, communications vehicles and other support and transport vehicles. It would be fully mobile and self-supporting for seven days. The force was capable of being split into four separate, self-supporting units to disperse key members of the royal family to different locations.

The plan had contingencies for different situations depending on the political situation and the amount of preparation time.

- During the Precautionary Phase of the Government War Plan, the royal family would disperse to country houses away from London. Known royal residences such as Balmoral Castle and Sandringham House would not have been used.
- Where there was sufficient time, the royal family would be evacuated to sea. The royal yacht HMY Britannia was earmarked for this purpose and was planned to hide in the lochs of northwest Scotland.
- Where there was little warning time, the royal family would be evacuated to the nearest regional seat of government.

The home secretary and Prince Philip, Duke of Edinburgh, would remain with Queen Elizabeth II so they could hold a Privy Council and appoint a new prime minister if necessary.

The plan was renamed Operation Synchronise in 1965 and in 1968 was absorbed into PYTHON, the plan to relocate the core of government to the Central Government War Headquarters at Corsham. Under this plan, the Queen would be moved to Corsham Court during the Precautionary Phase and then moved into the Central Government War Headquarters at short notice if necessary. It was withdrawn as a plan separate to PYTHON in 1973.

== Recent developments ==
In February 2019, media reported that the Civil Contingencies Secretariat had "repurposed" Operation Candid to evacuate the royal family from London in the event of rioting following a no-deal Brexit; however, neither Buckingham Palace nor 10 Downing Street would comment on the report.

== See also ==
- Coats Mission, the plan to evacuate the royal family in the event of a German invasion of Britain during the Second World War.
