= Junior Leaders =

Junior Leaders was the name given to some Boys' Service training Regiments of the British Army that took entrants from the age of 15 who would eventually move on to join adult units at the age of seventeen and a half. Their aim was to produce and train the future Non-commissioned officers for their Regiment or Corps.

== History ==
Junior Leaders' Regiments began in the mid-1950s, growing from the earlier system of 'Boy Service', and continued into the 1990s. There were various Junior Leader Regiments for entrants to the various Regiments and Corps of the Army. These included:

- The All Arms Junior Leaders' Regiment, All Arms Junior Leaders' Regiment
- The Junior Infantryman Battalion (1967)
- The Infantry Junior Leaders Battalion
- The Junior Parachute Company
- Junior Leaders Regiment, Royal Armoured Corps
- Junior Leaders Battalion Royal Army Ordnance Corps
- Junior Leaders Regiment, Royal Corps of Transport
- Junior Leaders Regiment, Royal Army Service Corps
- The Junior Leaders Regiment Royal Artillery
- The Junior Leaders Regiment, (JLR), Royal Corps of Signals
- The Junior Leaders Regiment Royal Engineers

== Training ==
Training was provided in the following categories:

Education Junior Leaders were given the opportunity to study for and pass the then Army Certificate of First Class Education, thus qualifying them to eventually achieve Warrant Officer and Commissioned Officer rank. Junior Leaders could also study for O levels.

Military and Trade Training. Junior Leaders were given full military training, teaching them the skills of drill, Weapons handling, shooting and physical training. Most junior soldiers also undertook Trade training which saw many of them being posted to their Regular Units with Trade qualifications under their belt. Junior Leaders initially trained for 2 years made up of 6 Terms from the age of 15 but the training period was reduced to 12 months after the school leaving was increased to 16 years of age.

Weapons. Junior Leaders were taught to shoot and drill with their issue personal weapon RAC Crewman, the Sterling 9mm L2A1 Sub-machine Gun 'SMG' or rifle, initially the Lee–Enfield, later the L1A1 Self-Loading Rifle and then the L85A1. They were also taught bayonet drills and how to shoot the 9mm Browning Pistol, the SMG, LMG/ 7.62mm Bren Gun, 7.62MM General Purpose Machine Gun GPMG, Carl Gustav 84mm Recoilless Rifle and hand-grenade throwing.

Trade Training. Junior Leaders were trained in the main operating trades within their chosen corps.

Leadership, Adventure Training and Sports Special emphasis was given to leadership, important for future SNCOs. All forms of active pursuits were encouraged and included canoeing, sailing, rock climbing, map reading, cooking in the field and survival in arduous conditions.

Junior Leaders also attended military and civilian Outward Bound courses in the UK and abroad. A wide variety of sporting activities were available and competitions with military and civilian youth organisations in the UK and abroad were encouraged.

== Junior soldiers today ==
Today, the British Army recruits junior soldiers to the Army Foundation College, where they are given basic and specialist training, but they are not deployed on adult service until reaching legal age. This is markedly different from the old Boy Soldiers of the 19th Century, who might go into the field alongside adult soldiers in a variety of non-combat roles, such as buglers, but not dissimilar from the old Army apprenticeship schemes. Today's junior soldiers are titled depending on the Corps to which they belong; Junior Infantryman, for example. The Army Foundation College trains junior soldiers in the skills required for their roles as private soldiers in their respective Regiment or Corps, but not specifically for the role of senior NCO or Warrant Officer.

The Royal Bermuda Regiment, the British Army's territorial home-defence battalion for the British Overseas Territory (and former Imperial fortress) of Bermuda, operated its own Junior Leaders programme, starting with nineteen boys who passed out at Warwick Camp on 19 December 1969, thereafter forming the Junior Leaders Company. The regiment continued to operate the programme until the 1990s, when it was absorbed into the separate Bermuda Cadet Corps. The Junior Leaders had been part of the Bermuda Regiment (which became a Royal regiment in 2015), wearing the same cap badge, and operating from the same base, Warwick Camp, whereas the Cadet Corps was a separate organisation, operating through the school system. In 2012, due to financial constraints, the Bermuda Cadet Corps was disbanded, and the Bermuda Regiment Junior Leaders resurrected. Many of the Royal Bermuda Regiment's officers, warrant officers, and NCOs began their service in the Junior Leaders, including Lieutenant-Colonel Brian Gonsalves, who retired as Commanding Officer in 2013. A bill was tabled in the House of Assembly of Bermuda in 2015 to formalise the organisation of the Royal Bermuda Regiment's Junior Leaders.

The Royal Air Force Air Cadets runs a course also named Junior leaders, aimed at cadets aged 17 and over, with the aim of delivering the highest standard of Leadership to cadets using infantry tactics as a vehicle. The Course is also open to any Cadet from the MOD sponsored cadet forces (Community Cadet Forces, Combined Cadet Force).
