= Auxiliary Fire Service =

Unit of the British Civil Defence Service, 1938–1968

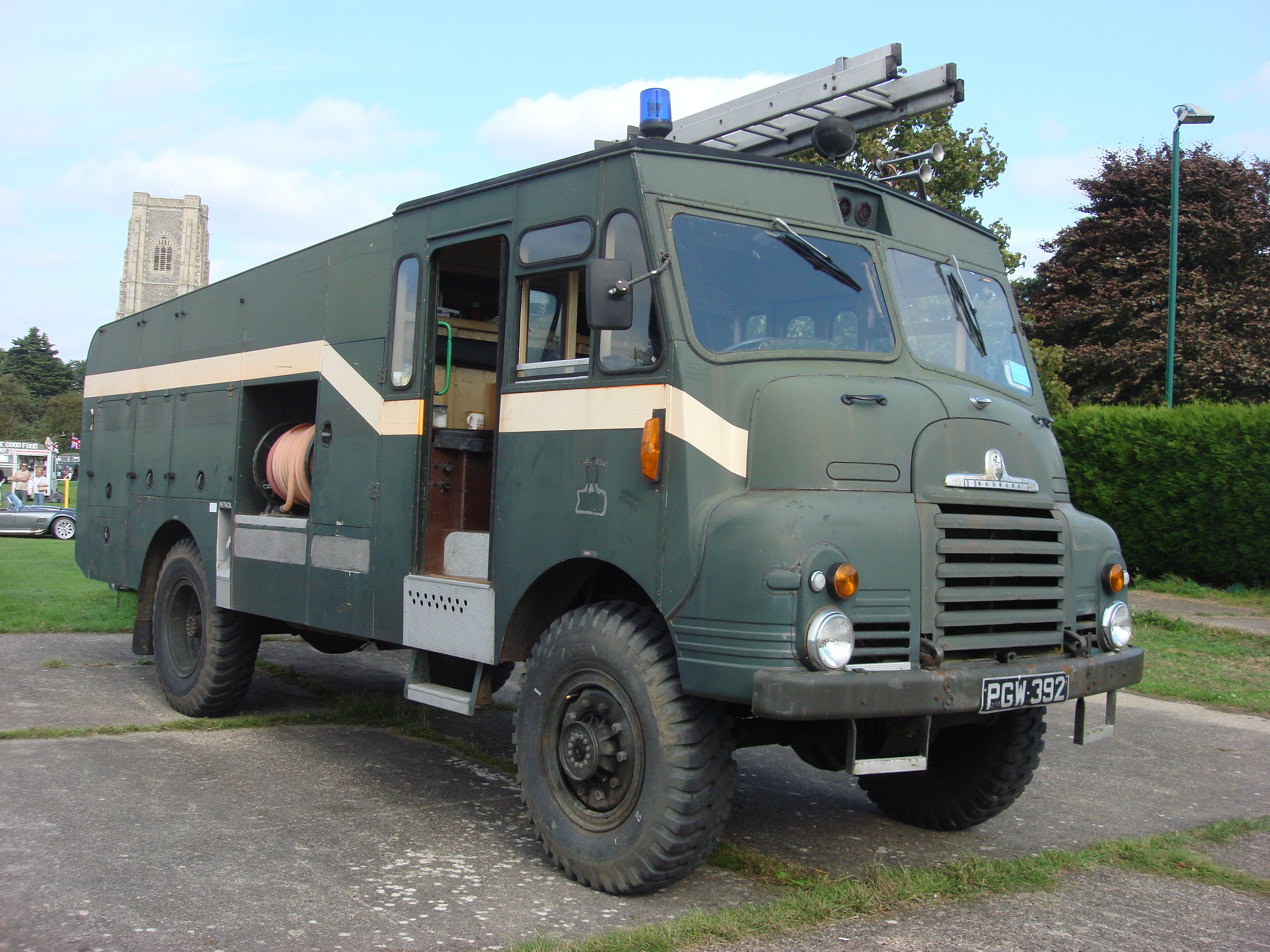
A post-war Bedford RLHZ Self Propelled Pump (Green Goddess).

The Auxiliary Fire Service (AFS) was first formed in 1938 in Great Britain as part of the Civil Defence Service. Its role was to supplement the work of brigades at local level. The Auxiliary Fire Service and the local brigades were superseded in August 1941 by the National Fire Service. After the war the AFS was reformed alongside the Civil Defence Corps, forming part of the UK's planned emergency response to a nuclear attack. It was disbanded in the UK in 1968.

Members of the AFS were unpaid part-time volunteers, but could be called up for whole-time paid service if necessary. This was very similar to the wartime establishment of the police Special Constabulary. Men and women could join, the latter mainly in an administrative role. A first-hand account of the type of work they undertook is given by A S Bullock in Gloucestershire Between the Wars: A Memoir.

== Organisation ==
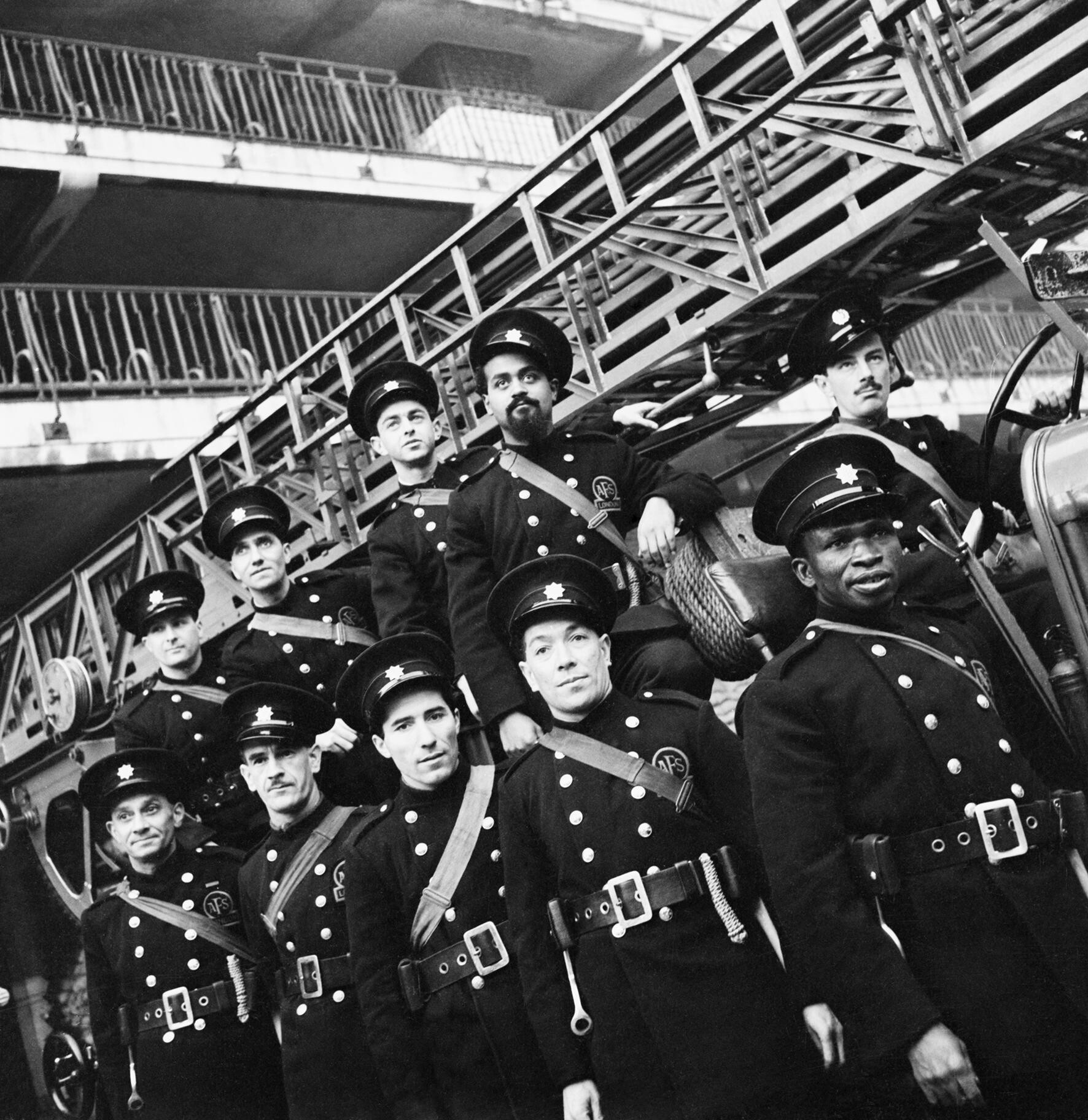
An AFS unit with their fire engine in London, 1941

An AFS was formed in every county borough, borough and urban district, and there was also one in the London County Council area. Each AFS was commanded by a commandant, with deputy and assistant commandants in the larger services. The services operated their own fire stations, each commanded by a section officer, and station areas were divided into fire beats, each under the command of a patrol officer. Services with five or more stations divided them into divisions, each under the command of a divisional officer. These ranks were not laid down by the government, and some services used different systems.

Ranks

- Auxiliary fireman
- Patrol officer
- Section officer
- Deputy commandant
- Commandant

In this job it was hampered severely by the incompatibility of equipment used by these different brigades – most importantly the lack of a standard size of hydrant valve.

== Post-war ==
The Auxiliary Fire Service was reformed in 1948 alongside the Civil Defence Corps, starting initially with old National Fire Service equipment. However the role of the AFS was to provide mobile fire fighting columns that could be deployed to areas that had suffered a nuclear attack (it being assumed that the local fire fighting capability would most likely have been lost). The old equipment was not suitable for this task, so in the 1950s the AFS was reequipped. This included 1,000 Green Goddess (Bedford RLHZ Self Propelled Pump) fire engines, Land Rovers, motorcycles and support vehicles such as pipe carriers, mobile kitchens, and foam and water carriers.

It was anticipated there would be some warning of the nuclear attack allowing some regular fire fighting equipment to join the AFS columns which would head to wherever they were required. These were substantial columns comprising many types of vehicles designed to be self-sufficient, so including motorcycles to go ahead and control traffic (e.g. AJS and Matchless), and carry messages, control vehicles such as the Land Rover and Austin Gipsy, field telephone equipment, fire fighting vehicles, pipe, water and foam carriers, as well as breakdown trucks and stores and catering. The AFS equipment was painted in British Standard 381C colour Deep Bronze Green, and carried large AFS door transfers.

Each fire station typically had an AFS division, and so AFS crews frequently attended fires and accidents alongside their regular colleagues. They provided significant assistance at some of the worst fires, such as that at Billingsgate Market and at Barking wood yard. AFS personnel were trained in firefighting by their own officers and with assistance from full-time fire officers. Many were trained to the St John Ambulance Higher First Aider Certificate standard – often proving invaluable at major incidents involving injury.

The Green Goddesses were used in two forms, initially a 4×2 (two-wheel drive) version based on the Bedford SHZ chassis powered by a 6-cylinder 110-brake-horsepower (82-kilowatt) Beford petrol engine, carrying 400 imperial gallons (1,800 litres) of water and a 1,000 imp gal/min (4,500 L/min) Sigmund FN4 centrifugal pump. Later versions were based on the Bedford 4×4 RLHZ chassis, with the same pump and 300 imp gal (1,400 L) water capacity. Their primary role was as a mobile pump, and they could combine to provide a pipe relay over great distances when connected using 6-inch (150 mm) hose, supplying 1,000 imp gal/min (4,500 L/min) from one location to another, often the seat of a major fire. An inflatable dam was often used as the source for the relay, usually fed by using several light portable pumps powered by Coventry Climax FWP engines. Water could be drawn from "open water" supplies (rivers, lakes or reservoirs) by a Transportable Water Unit more commonly known as "Bikini Units". These were floated on a raft so they could draw directly from a water and also use water under pressure to propel the raft.

The AFS (and the Civil Defence Corps) has never had any connection with any of the British armed forces, even though they used the same bronze-green paint colour. Although the supply of vehicles and equipment to both came via the Ministry of Supply, the AFS equipment was civilian registered and not military registered. When the AFS was disbanded in 1968, the 4×2 Green Goddess units were auctioned, but the 4×4 version and Land Rovers and Austin Gipsys were mothballed against some future emergency. Local authority fire brigades could borrow Home Office vehicles to meet exceptional needs, and 500 Green Goddesses were brought out of retirement during the drought of 1976. The government used Army and Royal Navy personnel to man and operate fire appliances during the firemen's strikes, including Home Office equipment brought out of storage (https://www.fbu.org.uk/history/nine-week-national-pay-strike-begins-14-november). The Fire Service Circular in 1984 showed 1,079 Green Goddess emergency pumps, 142 Land Rovers/Austin Gipsies, 369 trucks and 2,321 lightweight portable hose pumps held in reserve. Although they had been stored all over the UK, from 1992 the Green Goddess pumps were all relocated to the large TNT Truck Care depot in Marchington, Staffordshire. In 1997 a total of 96 low-mileage Austin Gipsies were auctioned by the Home Office at Measham, and the Green Goddesses and remaining Gipsies were sold in 2005, many going to fire brigades in developing countries, particularly in Africa, some to preservation.

== See also ==
- 1941 Old Palace School bombing
- Volunteer fire department
- Cyril Demarne
