= Bedford TK =

British truck

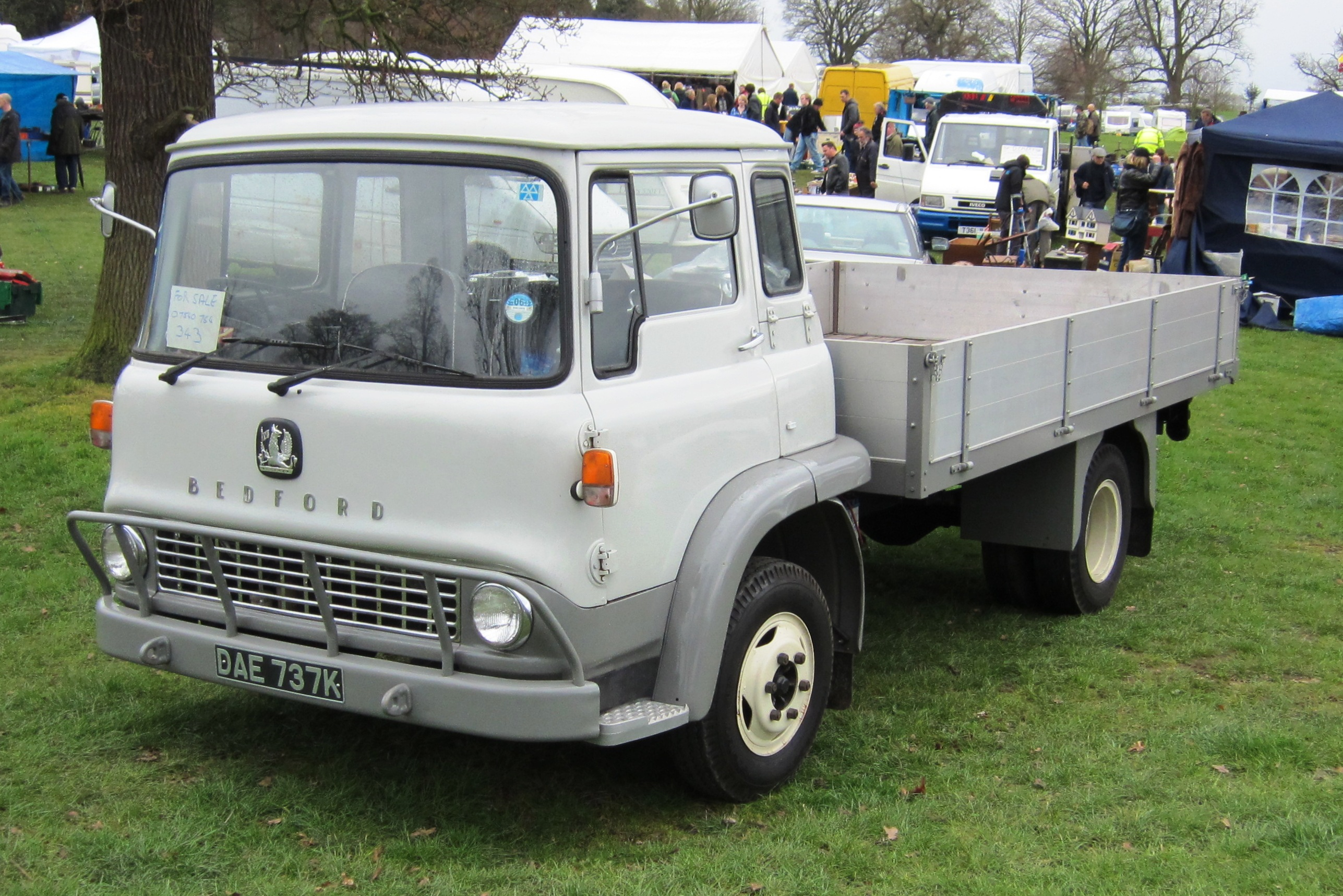
- 1971 Bedford TK

Overview
- Manufacturer: Bedford; AWD
- Also called: Bedford MK; Bedford MJ
- Production: 1960–1986 (Bedford); 1988–1992 (AWD); 1965–1994 (Genoto)
- Assembly: Dunstable, England; Petone, New Zealand; Pagewood, Dandenong, The Valley, Birkenhead, Mosman Park, Australia; Istanbul, Turkey (Genoto)

Body and chassis
- Class: Medium truck, military vehicle
- Body style: Chassis cab, flatbed, troop carrier, tipper, recovery vehicle
- Layout: Longitudinal front engine Two-wheel drive (TK); Four-wheel drive (MK)

Powertrain
- Engine: Bedford; Leyland; Perkins; Mercedes-Benz OM352, 5,675 cc (346.3 cu in) (TR)
- Transmission: 4-speed manual

Dimensions
- Wheelbase: 3.96 metres
- Length: 6.58 metres
- Width: 2.49 metres
- Height: 2.50 metres (cap); 3.40 metres (tarpaulin)
- Kerb weight: 5.1 tons

Chronology
- Predecessor: Bedford S type Bedford RL
- Successor: Bedford TL

The Bedford TK is a truck manufactured by Bedford. Launched in 1960 to replace the Bedford S type, the TK was scheduled to be replaced by the Bedford TL in 1981, but manufacturing of the TK continued as a cheaper alternative. A military 4x4 version, the Bedford MK (later MJ), was also produced. After Bedford's Dunstable factory was sold in 1987 to AWD, the TK restarted production for military only use until 1992 when AWD was placed in receivership.

== History and use ==
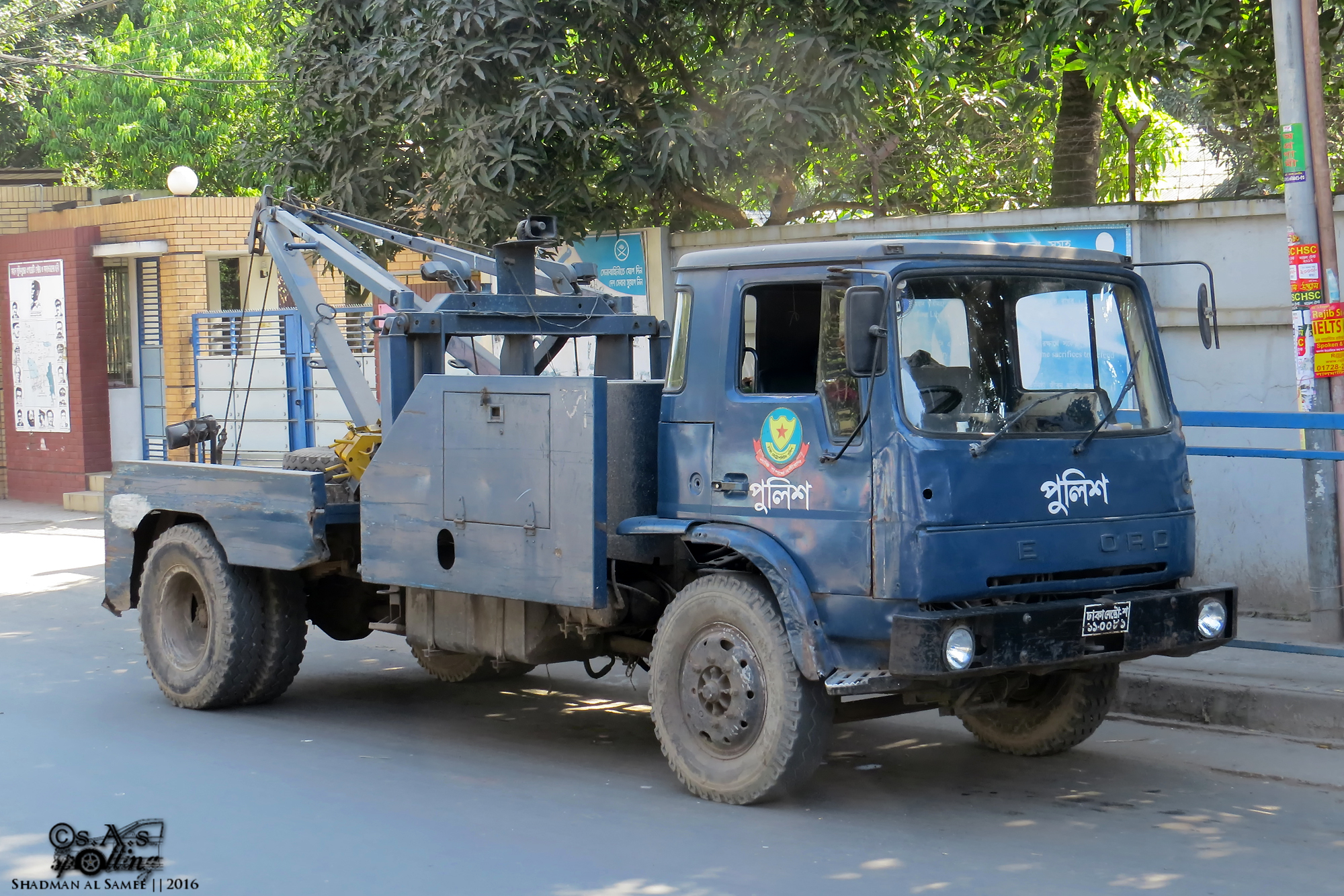
A Bedford TK in Bangladesh, converted into a DMP tow truck.

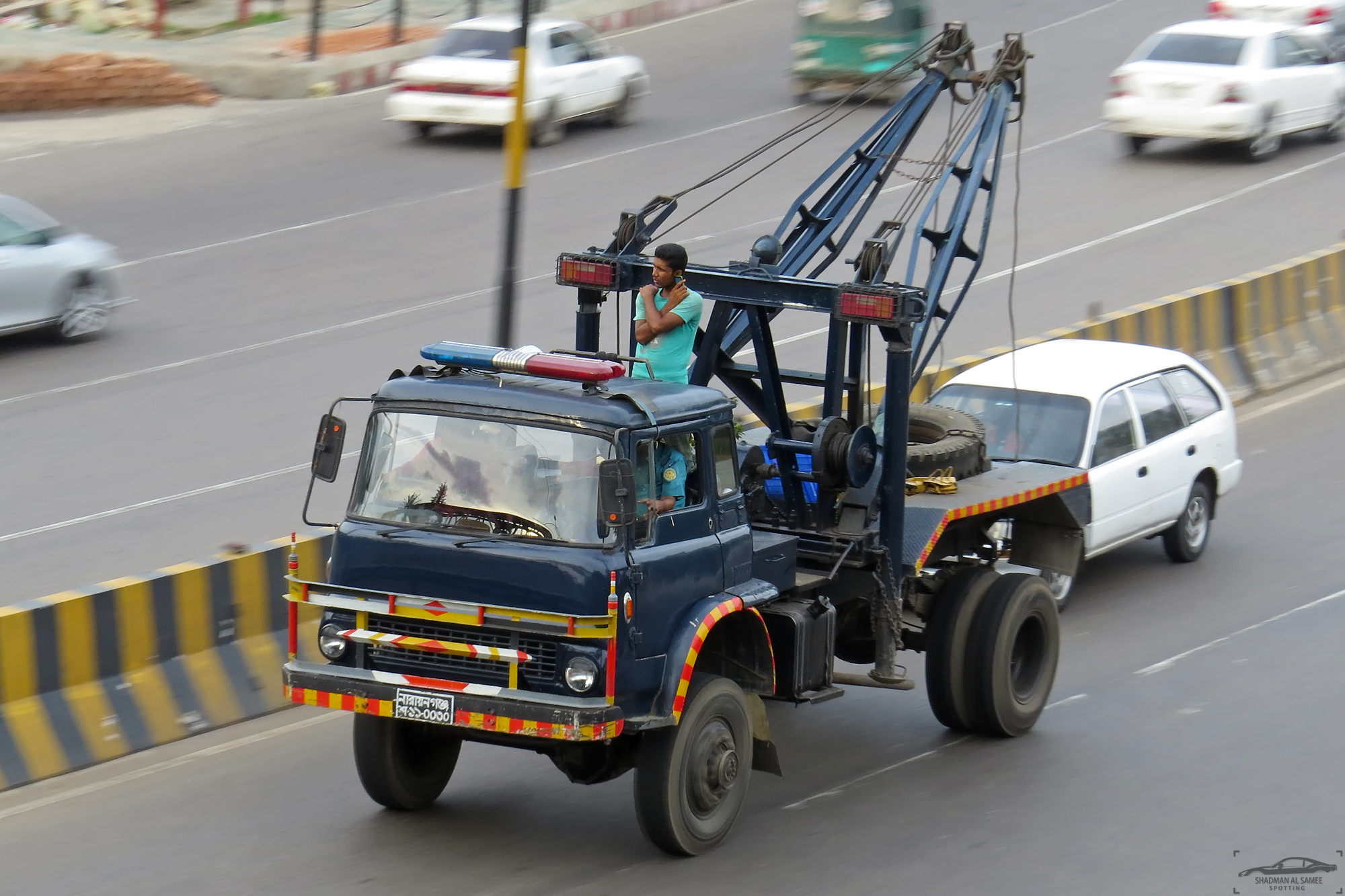
Ditto.

The TK range replaced the Bedford S type in 1960, and served as the basis for a variety of derivatives, including fire engines, military, horse carriers, tippers, flatbed trucks, and other specialist utilities. A General Post Office (later British Telecom) version used for installing telegraph poles was known as the Pole King.

Available with inline four or inline six cylinder petrol and diesel engines from Bedford, Leyland and Perkins, the TK was the quintessential light truck in the United Kingdom through most of the 1960s and 1970s, competing with the similar Ford D series. It was available in rigid form, and also as a light tractor unit normally using the Scammell coupling form of semi-trailer attachment.

In 1981, Bedford introduced turbocharging to the "Red Series" 3.6-litre and 5.4-litre diesel engines, now producing 72 bhp and 102 bhp respectively.

TKs were assembled for many years by General Motors New Zealand (GMNZ) at its Petone truck plant. The model was very popular and competed with the like of the also locally assembled Ford D series. It was succeeded by the TM series and GMNZ later switched source to launch a range of Bedford-by-Isuzu models assembled locally from kits shipped from Japan. Over 500,000 were produced. They were also assembled by Holden in Australia.

== MK/MJ ==
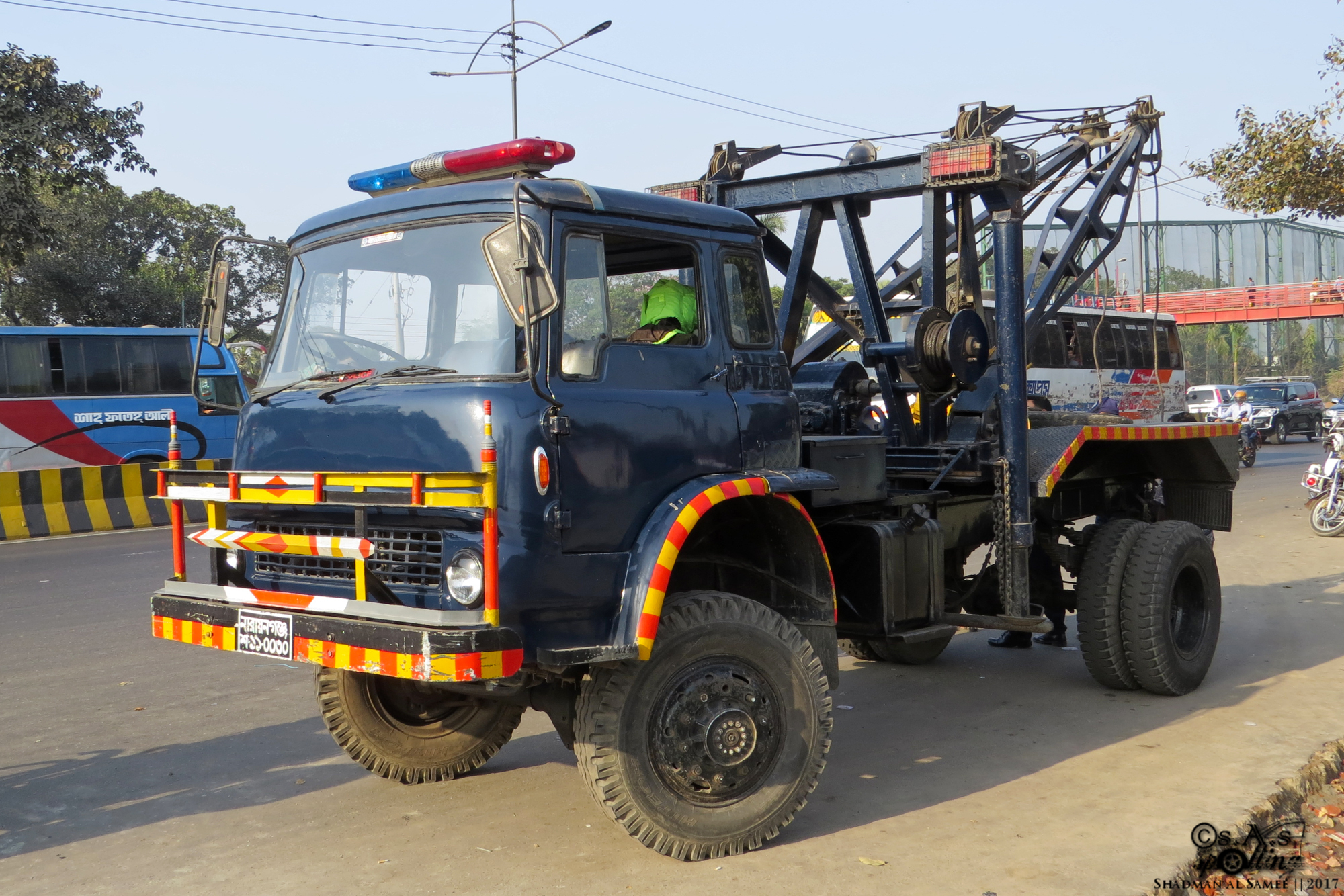
A Bedford MJ in Narayanganj, Bangladesh, converted into a police tow truck.

The Bedford MK/MJ was a 4x4 variant of the TK used in large numbers by the British Armed Forces and others. The Bedford MK was introduced in 1970 to replace the Bedford RL. It was very successful with over 50,000 produced. The MK/MJ was produced in many variants. From April 1981, Bedford changed the designation of the MK to MJ as the K multi-fuel engine was superseded by the J turbo charged diesel engine. It was confirmed in March 2014 that, with the exception of a handful of light recovery vehicles, all British Army Bedford MK/MJ trucks had been disposed of, replaced by RMMV HX60 4x4 trucks.

After Bedford's Dunstable factory was sold in 1987 to AWD, the MK restarted production for military only use until 1992 when AWD was placed in receivership.
