= Green Goddess =

Military fire engine produced on Bedford chassis

Bedford RLHZ Self Propelled Pump
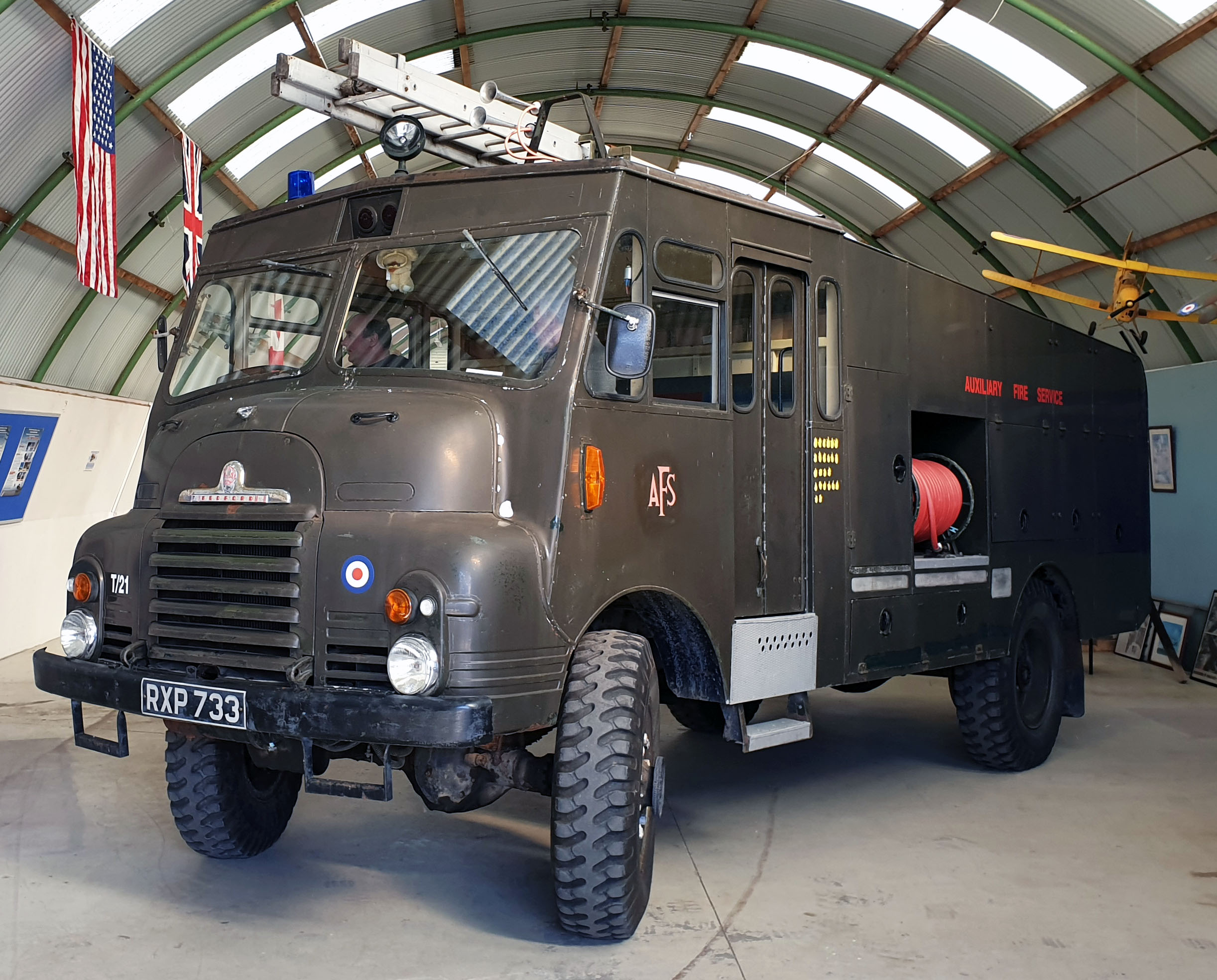
- Preserved Auxiliary Fire Service Green Goddess at the Montrose Air Station Heritage Centre

Overview
- Manufacturer: Bedford (General Motors)
- Also called: Green Goddess
- Production: 1953–1956

Body and chassis
- Class: Commercial vehicle, emergency services vehicle, military vehicle
- Body style: Fire engine
- Layout: Longitudinal front engine, rear-wheel drive (2×4), or four-wheel drive (4×4)
- Related: Bedford RL

Powertrain
- Engine: 4.9 L (300 cu in) 110 bhp (82 kW) I6 petrol
- Transmission: 4-speed manual

The Green Goddess is the colloquial name for the RLHZ Self Propelled Pump manufactured by Bedford Vehicles, a fire engine used originally by the British Auxiliary Fire Service (AFS), and latterly held in reserve by the Home Office until 2004, and available when required to deal with exceptional events, including being operated by the British Armed Forces during firefighters' strikes (1977 and 2002). These green-painted vehicles were built between 1953 and 1956 for the AFS. The design was based on a Bedford RL series British military truck.

== Auxiliary Fire Service ==
The Auxiliary Fire Service, first established in 1938 and amalgamated into the National Fire Service during World War II, was re-established as a voluntary service in 1948 alongside the Civil Defence Corps as part of civil defence preparations during the early stages of the Cold War, with subsequent events such as the Soviet Union detonating an atomic bomb making their presence supporting civilians as part of Britain's civil defence an important role. In a report to the Civil Service by the Strath Committee, which was kept secret from the general population, it was thought that a nuclear attack on Britain would cause firestorms in major cities, which would overwhelm the ordinary fire service, so a large stock of basic fire engines was ordered to form a reserve capacity.

The Green Goddess machines were not primarily fire engines (AFS members referred to them as "appliances"), instead being titled "self-propelled pumps", with some being two-wheel drive (4×2), and others in four-wheel drive (4×4) configuration. In the event of a nuclear attack on Britain, as part of a 125-vehicle AFS 'Mobile Column', Green Goddess appliances were to be deployed in a relay system of up to 20 miles (32 km) to pump huge quantities of water from lakes, rivers, canals and other sources to regular firefighters in affected cities. Supported by AFS Land Rover or Austin Gipsy command cars equipped with barometers for deployment uphill or downhill, Green Goddesses were stationed at regular intervals to boost water pressure; to transport large volumes of water from beaches or estuaries, three inflatable rafts equipped with portable pumps were provided on the back of Bedford RL or Commer Q4 'Transportable Water Unit' flatbeds, known informally as the 'Bikini Unit'. Firefighting was a secondary role.

The Green Goddess remained in continuous use by the AFS, regularly being deployed on training exercises, until the disbandment of the Civil Defence Corps and the AFS in 1968 by the government of Harold Wilson due to high costs and a lack of volunteers, having disbanded the Rescue Section and Ambulance and First Aid Section two years prior.

== Technical specifications ==
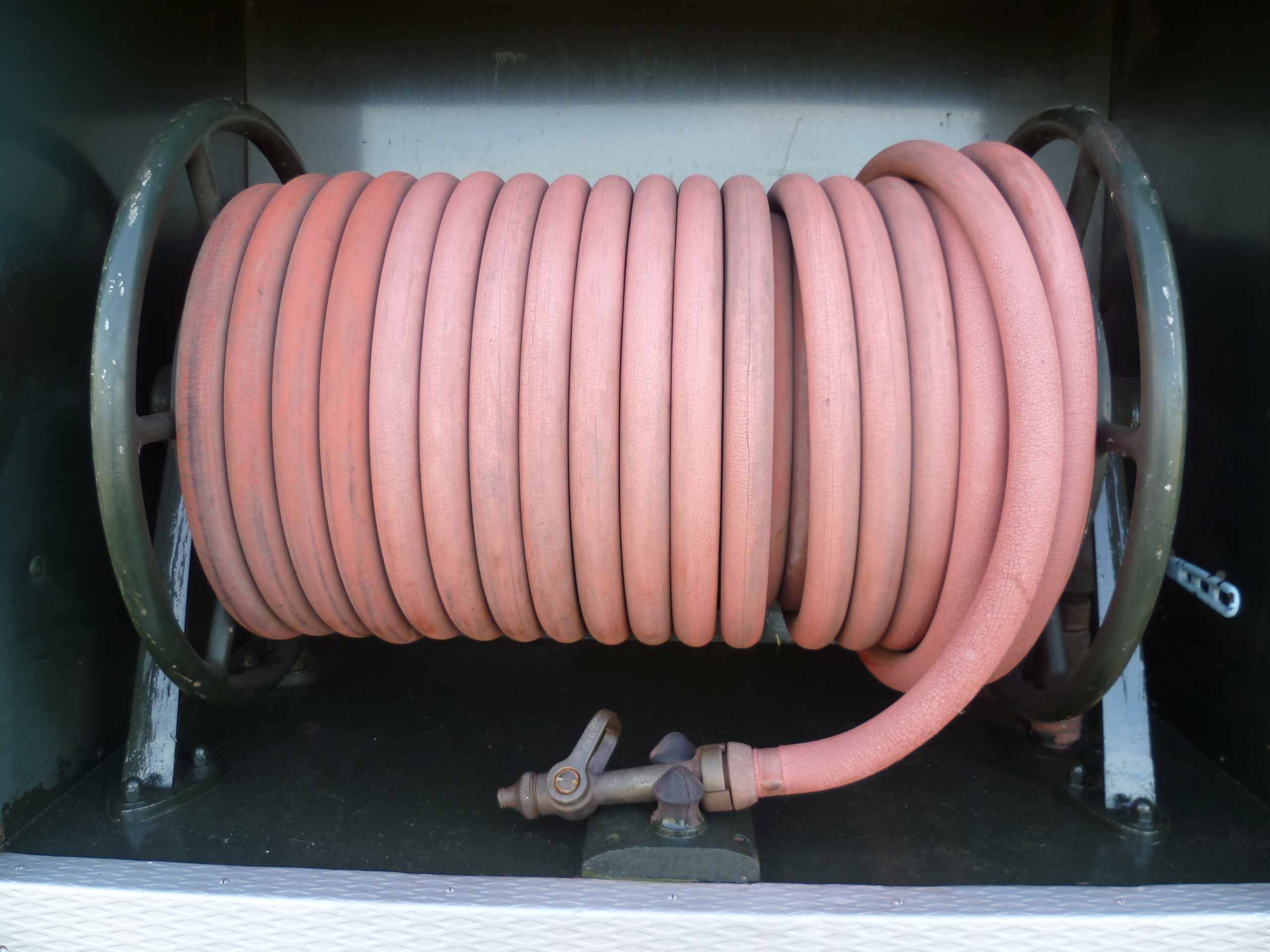
Green Goddess hose

Unlike modern engines, Green Goddesses had no radio, no cutting equipment, no power steering and only a single ladder, and were relatively slow with a maximum speed of around 65 mph (105 km/h), a comfortable cruising speed of 45 mph (70 km/h), and they were sensitive on corners. Fuel consumption was between 8 and 10 mpg_{‑imp} (35 and 28 L/100 km; 7 and 8 mpg_{‑US}), depending on driving style and quantity of water carried. They also have less water capacity at 400 imperial gallons (1,800 litres) in 4×2 form – 300 imp gal (1,400 L) on 4×4 form – than a modern vehicle, and poorer stability due to a lack of baffle partitions in the water tank.

Most had bodywork assembled by Papworth Industries, although up to 200 had bodies assembled by Park Royal Vehicles. Some were later modified by the installation of flashing blue lights and two-tone warning sirens, and alterations to the rear lamps, to bring them into line with then current practice on "regular" emergency appliances. Mechanically, they were designed to be robust and easy to maintain in the event of a nuclear attack.

The Green Goddess carried a range of equipment from standard hose and branches, through a selection of nozzles to provide different flows and jet patterns, to Light Portable Pumps and Ceiling Arresters. They all carried a 33.5 feet (10.2 m) extension ladder, together with at least one scaling ladder. Some carried additional equipment, such as hook ladders, radios, large bolt cutters, etc.

=== Pumps ===
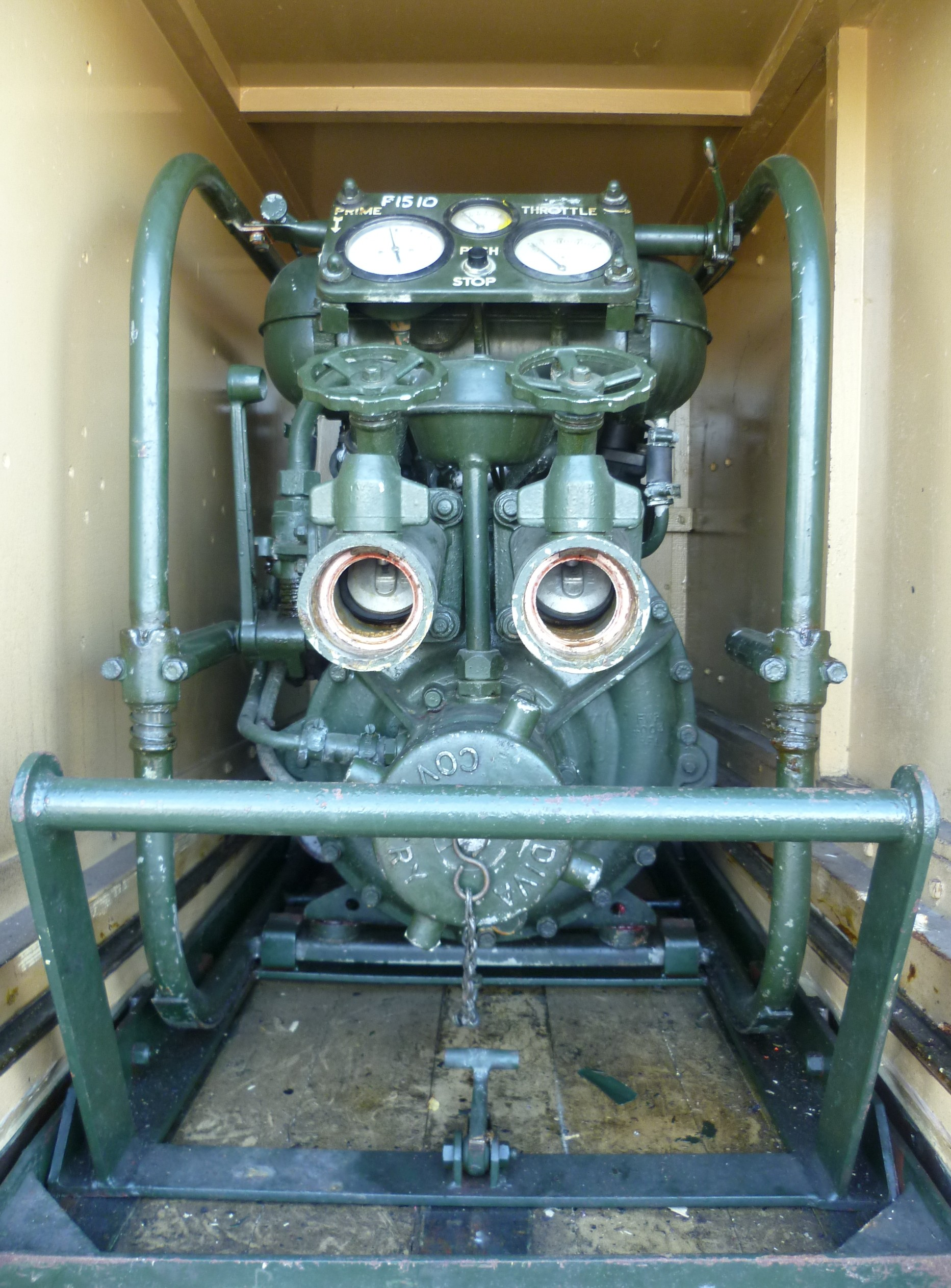
Green Goddess Coventry Climax Godiva fire pump

The Sigmund F.N.5 main pump has a capacity of 1,000 imp gal/min (4,500 L/min) per minute (900 imp gal/min (4,100 L/min) on 4×4 versions). Normal fire hoses could be used either from the main pump, which had four outlets, or from normal fire hydrants for which an assortment of connecting branches were carried. In addition, the machines carried a small Coventry Climax 350 imp gal/min (1,600 L/min) pump, with its own petrol engine, which could also draw water from a river or other source, again feeding normal fire hoses, and which provided a separate and self-contained fire fighting capability. A 400 imp gal (1,800 L) water tank (300 imp gal or 1,400 L on 4×4) was installed, which fed small diameter hoses on each side of the vehicle to give an immediate "first aid" capacity to fight a fire while the main hoses were connected and brought into use. A stirrup pump was also carried, together with a full range of other suitable tools and equipment.

=== Crew ===
The vehicles were normally crewed by an officer in charge, who sat in the front passenger seat, a driver/pump operator, and four fire fighters seated on the crew bench.

In the mid-1960s, some Territorial Army artillery regiments were earmarked for a water pumping role, partly because the six-man gun crew matched the numbers on the pump units. Training methods and rotation of roles were common factors in gunnery and water pumping; artillery regiments undertook a two-week course at Le Marchant Barracks in the town of Devizes in lieu of their normal annual gunnery training camp.

== Operational use ==
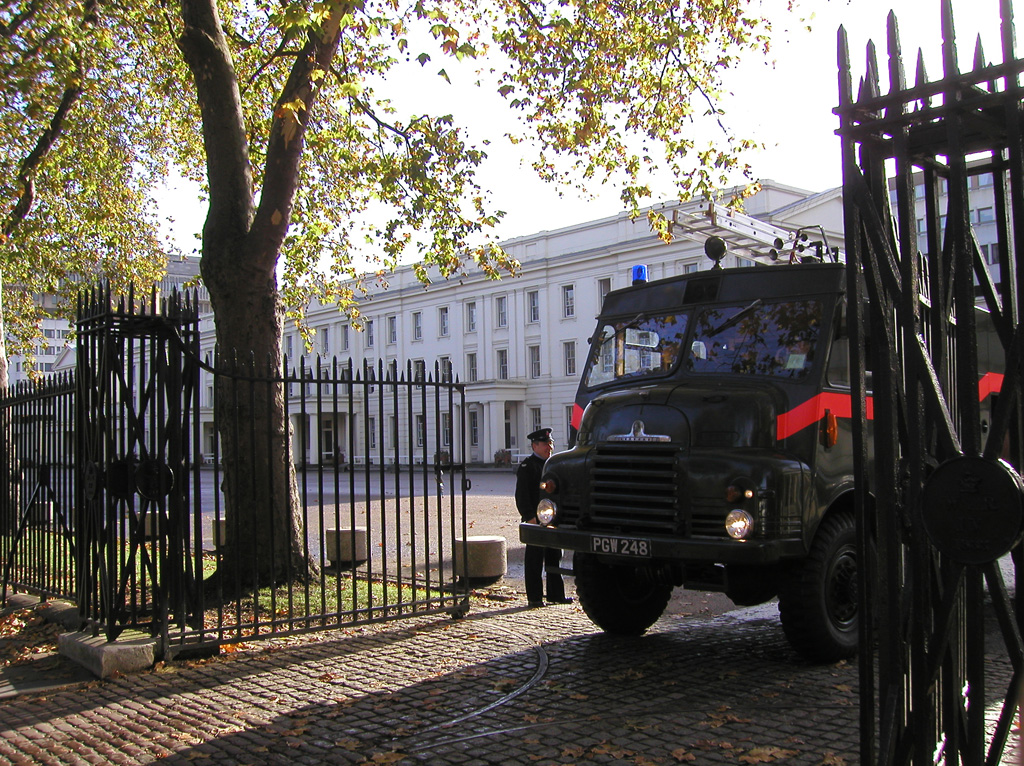
A Green Goddess emerging from Wellington Barracks in November 2002 during the 2002–2003 United Kingdom firefighter dispute

Prior to disbandment, the AFS used the Green Goddess extensively in support of the local fire services throughout the United Kingdom. They provided additional water delivery and firefighting capability at times when the regular fire brigades had a major incident to contain. The ability to relay large quantities of water over considerable distances was invaluable in some more remote locations, or where the incident required more water than local water systems could provide. Most UK boroughs had an Auxiliary Fire Service detachment housed alongside the regular brigade equipment.

After 1968, the vehicles were mothballed, but occasionally used by the Armed Forces to provide fire cover in a number of fire strikes, notably in 1977 and between 2002 and 2003, the latter of which saw 827 placed on standby. They were also deployed to pump water in floods and droughts and to tackle brush fires during heatwaves. They were well maintained in storage at Bruntingthorpe Aerodrome and were regularly road tested; in 1989, the contract to maintain and store the Green Goddess fleet was handed by the government to TNT N.V. subsidiary TNT Truckcare, who stored the fleet in a new warehouse facility in Marchington.

The role of Green Goddesses was superseded by new contingency arrangements. The Fire and Rescue Services Act 2004 gave the government the power to instruct fire and rescue authorities to make their own vehicles available in the event of future industrial action. New Incident Response Units introduced after the September 11, 2001 attacks offered high-power pumping ability among a range of other contingency functions.

=== Refurbishment ===
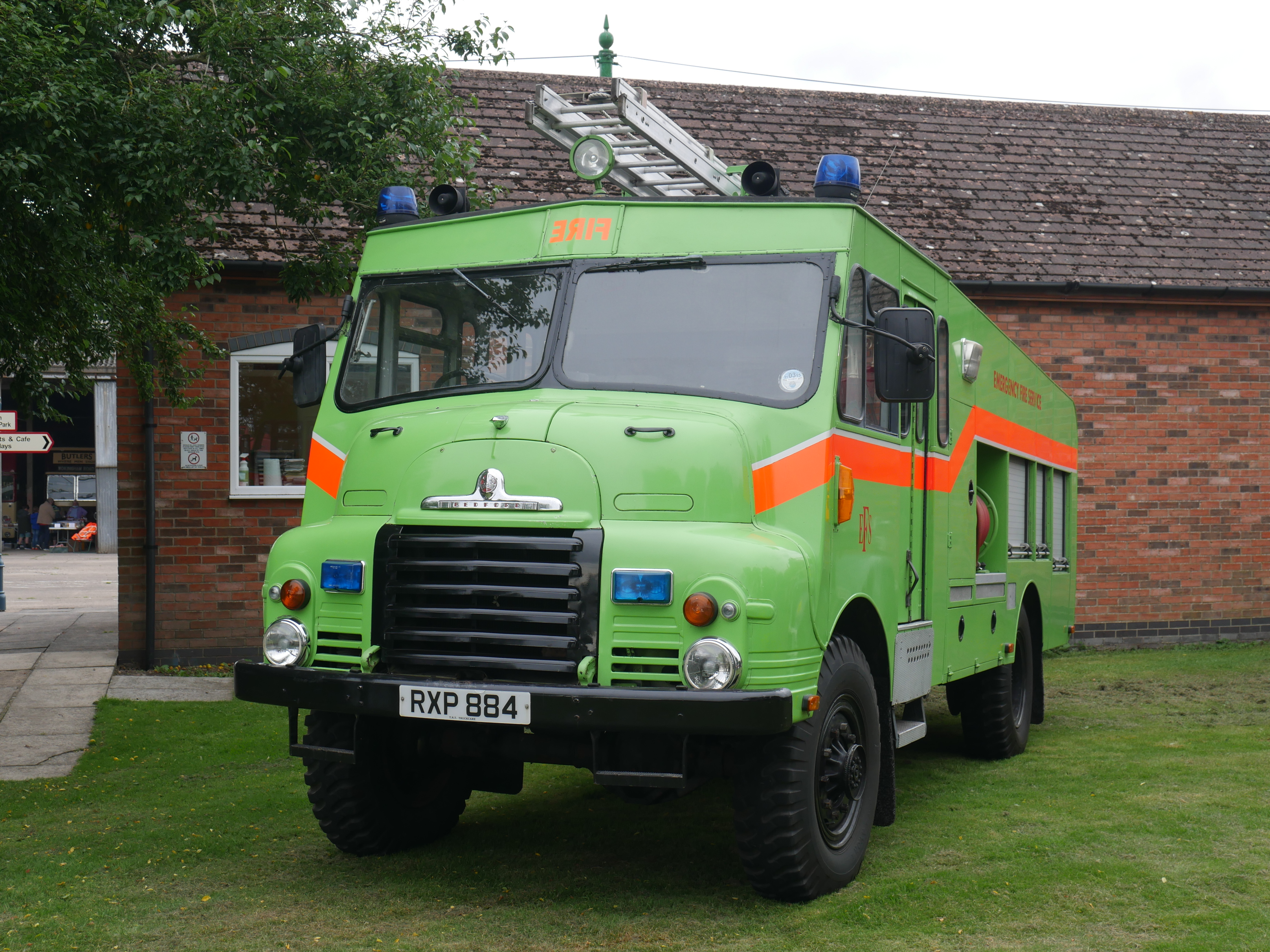
Green Goddess refurbished by TNT Truckcare on display at The Trolleybus Museum at Sandtoft in August 2021

One Green Goddess was donated by the Home Office to TNT Truckcare for an extensive refurbishment trial in 1998. With the aim to bring Green Goddesses held in reserve up to modern firefighting standards in the event they were required to replace conventional appliances, the refurbished Green Goddess, registration RXP 884, was equipped with a new Cummins B Series diesel engine and a ZF five-speed gearbox, an in-cab heater, a modernised emergency lights and siren system including an experimental directional siren, electrically heated mirrors, roller shutter equipment bay doors, a vacuum brake and a new lighter green livery with 'Emergency Fire Service' lettering.

=== 'Yellow Goddess' ===
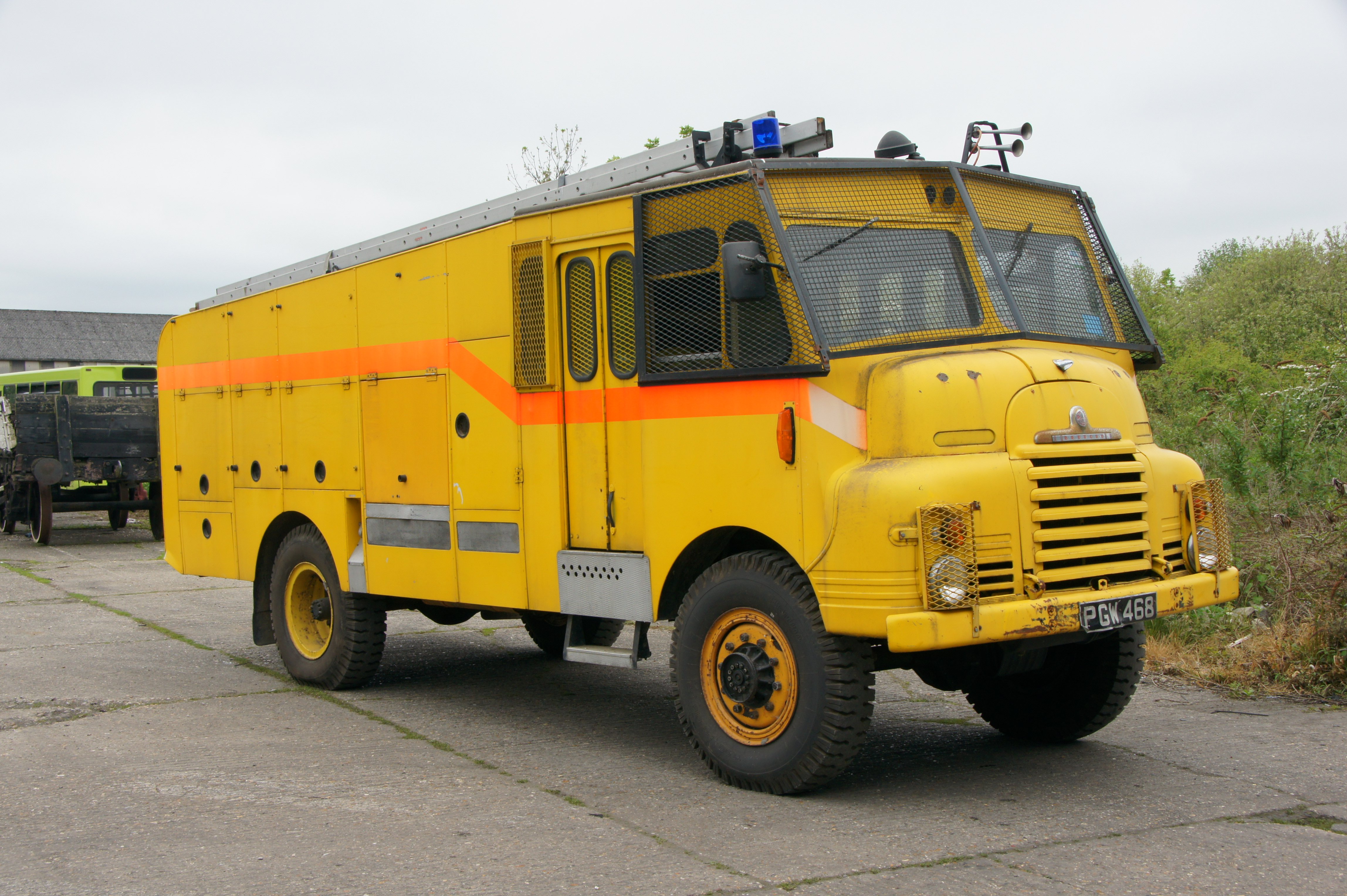
Preserved 'Yellow Goddess' featuring modifications for use in Northern Ireland

Ahead of the 2002–2003 strikes, 32 Green Goddesses were shipped to Northern Ireland to cover for striking Northern Ireland Fire and Rescue Service firefighters. To distinguish them from conventional British Army vehicles, which placed them and their crews at risk of being attacked by dissident groups, the Green Goddesses were painted yellow, equipped with protective grilles over their windows and lights, and some gained dateless 'Q plates'. As such, these Northern Irish appliances gained the nickname of the 'Yellow Goddess'.

== Disposal ==
In March 2004, the British Government announced that it was conducting a test sale of forty of its remaining fleet of more than nine hundred vehicles, and that it was planning to dispose of the remainder. The sale of the fleet was completed, and most of the vehicles were sold to fire brigades in developing countries, mostly in Africa. Some were donated to museums, including the prototype which was placed in the Museum of RAF Firefighting. Others are in the National Emergency Services Museum, Military Museum Scotland, National Museum of Scotland, Kent Firefighting Museum, Leicester Fire Brigade Museum, Yorkshire Air Museum, Norfolk Fire Museum and Montrose Air Station Heritage Centre. Some were purchased by vehicle restoration trusts and some are privately owned.

=== Exports ===
35 Green Goddessses were bought by Civil Defence Ireland and allocated to corporation and county council auxiliary fire services. 25 were bought new between 1961 and 1964, with ten more ex-British Government vehicles were bought second hand in 1971. Two more ex-British units were purchased by Dublin Civil Defence in 2005.

Following their withdrawals, Green Goddesses proved popular worldwide when exported second-hand. 80 Green Goddesses held in reserve across Scotland were donated to Azerbaijan by the British government in 1996 as part of an emergency aid package, with others donated to fire services in African countries such as Mozambique, Namibia, Nigeria, Rwanda and Zambia. Two Green Goddesses were also donated to Uruguay, with one operated by a volunteer fire department at the José Ignacio resort seeing frontline service during forest fires in the summer of 2023.

== See also ==
- Operation Fresco
- Military aid to the civil power
