= HMS Osprey, Portland =

Coordinates: 50.54356°N 2.45381°W

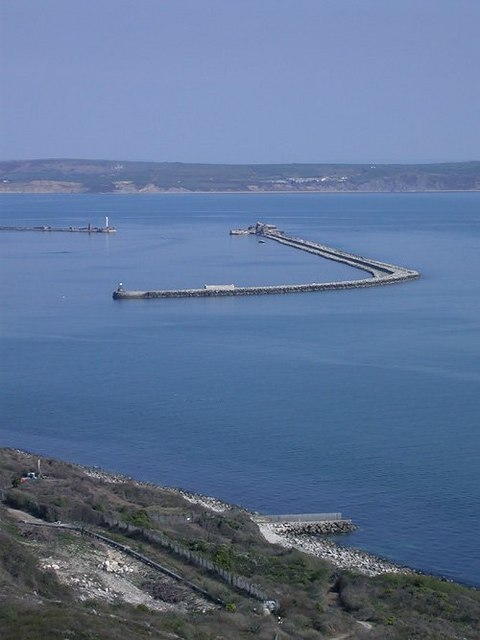
The site of the main complex of HMS Osprey is seen where the rubble now remains.

HMS Osprey was an anti-submarine training establishment located at the Isle of Portland, Dorset, England. It was active between 1924 and 1941, and again from 1946 to 1999. The helicopter station RNAS Portland formed part of the establishment from 1959 to 1999.

In 1948 Osprey took over (from HMS Boscawen) as parent ship of the naval base as a whole, with responsibility for pay, movement, administration and accounting. Subsequently all Portland-based naval personnel were borne on HMS Osprey, up until 1999 when Osprey was decommissioned.

== History ==
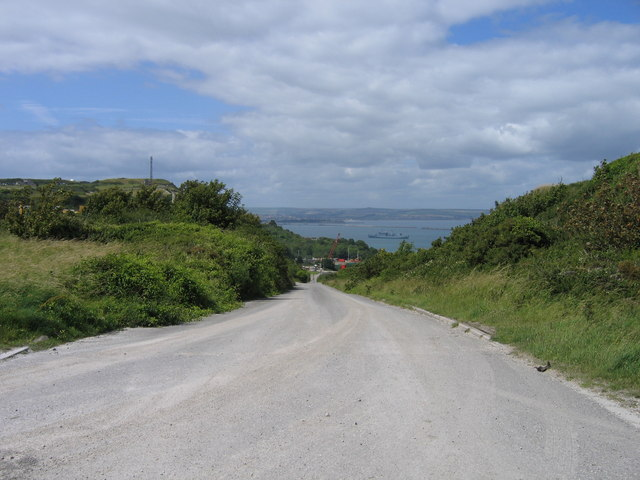
Incline Road led down into the establishment site.

With the development of anti-submarine equipment such as depth charges, howitzers and hydrophones during World War I, HMS Osprey was born from the increasing need for anti-submarine training and research. The establishment at Portland was commissioned as an independent shore command and parent ship of the First Anti-Submarine Flotilla on 1 April 1924. It was responsible for training personnel in the use of anti-submarine equipment and the development of experimental equipment, including ASDIC and later sonar.

HMS Osprey moved ashore in 1927 as a shore-based establishment. Following a major rebuild, King Edward VIII made an official visit to view the establishment in 1936. Due to HM Naval Base Portland being a prime target of the Luftwaffe during World War II, Osprey was transferred to Dunoon in Scotland in 1940, leaving Portland's shore-base to become HMS Attack (a Coastal Forces base).

HMS Osprey returned to Portland in 1946, as did the experimental section (which had been relocated separately to Fairlie for the duration of the war). The latter retained its independence after the war, evolving into HM Underwater Detection Establishment (HMUDE) in 1947. In 1959-60, HMUDE merged with a number of other establishments to become the Admiralty Underwater Weapons Establishment (AUWE). Owing to the highly classified work carried out there during the Cold War, the AUWE became the centre of worldwide attention in 1961 after the discovery of espionage infiltration. This became known as the Portland spy ring, a Soviet spy ring that operated in England from the 1950s until 1961 when the core of the network were arrested by the British security services.

1959 also saw the establishment of RNAS Portland as part of HMS Osprey; it was responsible for developing helicopters in an anti-submarine role, including the training of crews. From 1968, HMS Osprey was one of the designated locations for plan PYTHON, the plan for continuity of government in the event of nuclear war.

The end of the Cold War and subsequent defence budget cuts resulted in the closure of HM Naval Base Portland in 1995, as well as the AUWE research establishments, by then operated by the Defence Evaluation and Research Agency (DERA). RNAS Portland's closure followed on 31 March 1999. The former air station site has now been redeveloped as an industrial and recreational site, Osprey Quay, while the HMS Osprey complex at East Weares was demolished in 2004-05 by Portland Port Ltd, the new owners and operators of the harbour.
