= William Strath =

Scottish civil servant and industrialist

Sir William Strath, KCB (16 November 1906 – 8 May 1975) was a Scottish civil servant and industrialist.

Educated at Girvan High School and the University of Glasgow, he entered the civil service in 1929 as an official in the Inland Revenue; he moved to the Air Ministry in 1938 and then the Ministry of Aircraft Production in 1940. His post-war career included spells at the Ministry of Supply and HM Treasury. In 1954, as head of the Cabinet Office's central war plans secretariat, he was charged with chairing a committee on the impact of a hydrogen bomb attack on Britain; the "Strath Committee" would find that even a limited attack of ten bombs would have dire consequences for the country. He sat on the UK Atomic Energy Authority from 1955 to 1959 and then served as Permanent Secretary of the Ministry of Supply in 1959 and the Ministry of Aviation from 1959 to 1960. In 1961, he became Group Managing Director of Tube Investments, serving until 1972; he was also Chairman of the British Aluminium Company from 1962 to 1972.

Government offices
Preceded by position created	Permanent Secretary of the Ministry of Aviation; 1959–1960	Succeeded by Sir Henry Hardman
