= Tonfanau =

Coordinates: 52°36′45.1″N 4°07′29.2″W

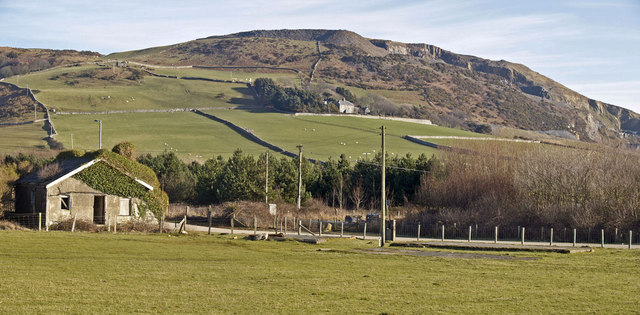
- The Station Master's old house and Tonfanau quarry

- Location within Gwynedd
- OS grid reference: SH 56154 03798
- Community: Llangelynnin
- Principal area: Gwynedd
- Preserved county: Gwynedd
- Country: Wales
- Sovereign state: United Kingdom
- Post town: TYWYN
- Postcode district: LL36
- Dialling code: 01654
- Police: North Wales
- Fire: North Wales
- Ambulance: Welsh
- UK Parliament: Dwyfor Meirionnydd
- Senedd Cymru – Welsh Parliament: Dwyfor Meirionnydd

Tonfanau is a coastal village in the community of Llangelynnin, in Gwynedd (formerly Merionethshire), Wales. It is 2.4 miles (3.9 km) north of Tywyn. The village is served by Tonfanau railway station.

During the Second World War an army base was created near the village. the camp was established around 1937 and covered about 220 acres with a camp theatre seating 1,000 and a small railway station. Around 600 men were stationed at the camp, which specialised in training personnel in anti-aircraft artillery.

Until 1992, a granite quarry existed to the north of the village.

== All Arms Junior Leaders' Regiment ==
From May 1959 until August 1966 the camp was the home of the All Arms Junior Leaders' Regiment (A.A.J.L.R.).

== PYTHON site ==
From 1968 the camp was one of the designated sites for plan PYTHON, the plan for continuity of government in the event of nuclear war. It was only the temporary PYTHON site for Wales and Aberystwyth University became the designated site soon after.

== Refugee Camp ==
In 1972, six years after closing in 1966, the base was reopened and used as a refugee centre. Ugandan Asians, expelled by Idi Amin, were housed in Tonfanau camp for six months before being settled elsewhere. By 24th October that year, 1,185 refugees had been placed In Tonfanau camp.

== Motor Racing ==
There is a one mile long racing circuit named after the village which has been used 4 times per year for motorbike racing since 1993

Racing is now organised by TRAC (Tonfanau Racing Association Club Tonfanau Road Racing) which took over when the existing team from Crewe and South Cheshire Motorcycle Club retired

Rallying was held once in 1990 but it has been exclusively motorcycles since

.[7]

== Transport ==
Tonfanau Railway Station is located on the Transport For Wales Cambrian Line. It has close connections to Birmingham (New St), Shrewsbury, Llandudno, and Aberystwyth. The next station south is Tywyn, and the next station north is Llwyngwril.

== Granite Quarry ==
In 1892, a group of local miners opened a granite quarry to the north of the village. Among them was William Williams Jones, who was a draper from Tywyn and attempted to open many quarries in the district – among them were Dolgoch quarry, Melinllynpair quarry, and Nantcynog quarry (which were all unsuccessful – Tonfanau quarry was his only enduring mining venture).

During the First World War, several German prisoners of war (who were being housed in Tywyn worked at the quarry between June 1918 and November 1919 (after which they were transferred to Frongoch internment camp near Bala); one of them experienced a fatal accident – they died from the injuries in Machynlleth Cottage Hospital.

The quarry closed in 1998, 106 years after opening.

== See also ==
- Tonfanau railway station
