= Girvan Academy =

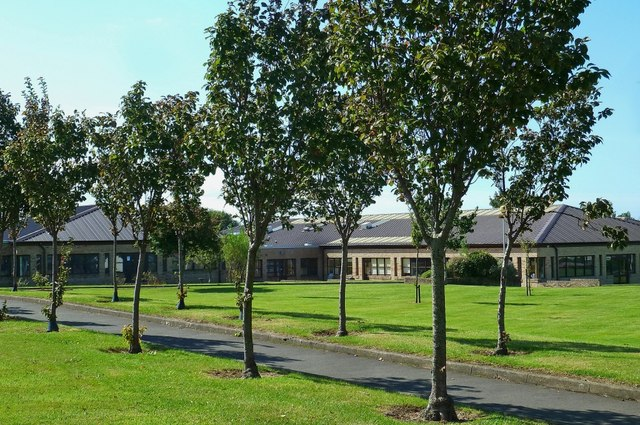

Location
- The Avenue; Girvan, South Ayrshire, KA26 9DW; Scotland

Information
- Type: Non-denominational secondary school under state control
- Established: 1812
- Local authority: South Ayrshire Council
- Head Teacher: Mark Anderson
- Staff: 42 Teaching staff 50 Support Staff
- Gender: Male and female
- Age: 11 to 18
- Enrolment: 521 As of 2017/18
- Website: www.girvanacademy.sayr.sch.uk

Girvan Academy is an 11–18 secondary school in Girvan, South Ayrshire, Scotland. It is the seventh largest secondary school in South Ayrshire, with a pupil roll of 541 enrolled at the school in 2023–2024. The school is the responsibility of South Ayrshire Council, with its head teacher responsible for the daily operation and running of the school.

Since 2021 the head teacher has been Mark Anderson, he replacing Elaine Harrigan.

== History ==
In the early 1800s there were two schools in Girvan: the Burgh School and the Parish School, which was also known as the Parochial or Grammar School at different times in its history. Around 1812, the two schools merged to form Girvan Higher Grade School which later became Girvan High School, subsequently renamed as Girvan Academy.

In 1981 a school team reached the semi-finals of the Top of the Form radio competition, where the school team competed against Aston Academy of South Yorkshire. Girvan won with 91 points, which is the highest in the radio series history. Girvan won the whole competition. The winning team received the trophy in January 1982, awarded by George Younger, Secretary of State for Scotland.

The present building was completed in 1988.

In 2017 the school launched a horticultural and rural skills programme.

== Notable pupils ==
- Graeme Eaglesham (born 1989), footballer
- Sir William Strath (1906–1975), civil servant
