= Graeme Eaglesham =

Scottish footballer (born 1989)

Personal information
- Date of birth: 30 June 1989 (age 37)
- Place of birth: Ayr, Scotland
- Height: 5 ft 11 in (1.80 m)
- Position: Forward

Team information
- Current team: Glenafton Athletic

Senior career*
Years	Team	Apps	(Gls)
2007–2009	Partick Thistle	2	(0)
2008	→ Albion Rovers (loan)	6	(0)
2010–2011	Queen's Park	13	(0)
2013–	Glenafton Athletic		
- * Club domestic league appearances and goals as of 14:30, 17 February 2013 (UTC)

Graeme Eaglesham (born 30 June 1989) is a Scottish footballer who has played as a forward in the Scottish Football League for Partick Thistle, Albion Rovers and Queen's Park. He now plays for Scottish Junior Football Association, West Region side Glenafton Athletic.

== Life and career ==
Born in Ayr to Gillian and William Eaglesham, he was a pupil at Girvan Academy. He spent time with Ayr United and Hamilton Academical as a youngster, but was released without making an appearance for the first team. He joined Partick Thistle from Maybole Juniors in the summer of 2007 and made his debut in the First Division in April 2008. He spent time on loan at Albion Rovers during the 2008–09 season, making six appearances in the Third Division. Eaglesham made two appearances for Partick.

He was released in the summer of 2009 and moved to Nebraska in the United States to begin a scholarship at Bellevue University. He returned to Scotland in 2010 and joined Queen's Park. Eaglesham made 13 appearances in the Third Division during the 2010–11 campaign and then went back to Bellevue for a further two seasons. Eaglesham signed a two-year contract with Scottish Junior Football West Premier League side Glenafton Athletic in January 2013.
