= Python (codename) =

British contingency plan for continuity of government

Python was a Cold War contingency plan of the British Government for the continuity of government in the event of nuclear war.

== Background ==
Following the report of the Strath Committee in 1955, the British government developed contingency plans for the continuity of government. This included construction of the underground Central Government War Headquarters (CGWHQ), codenamed "Burlington", at Corsham in Wiltshire. As planned, it would have been a "reserve Whitehall" where the central government could be moved in an emergency and, hopefully, survive a nuclear attack.

As nuclear weapons became more powerful and intercontinental ballistic missiles became more of a threat than crewed bombers, the concept of concentrating central government in a single location became flawed. Instead, government would be dispersed around the country with just core functions at CGWHQ. The Cuban Missile Crisis of 1962 prompted a radical rethink of continuity plans. Part of the thinking was that the "precautionary period" ahead of nuclear war, or a conventional war in Europe culminating in nuclear war, might only last two or three days rather than the seven days originally planned, so it would not be possible to fully staff CGWHQ with 4,000 people in time.

Python became active on 1 May 1968 and is described in the 1968 update to the Government War Book.

== Locations ==
Sites for dispersing government were selected in 1966 based on their existing accommodation, independence from the national power and water grids, nuclear fallout protection and distance from likely targets. The chosen sites were RNAS Culdrose in Cornwall, HMS Osprey in Dorset, Taymouth Castle (then the Civil Defence Corps Training School) in Scotland, and either the helicopter support ship RFA Engadine or royal yacht HMY Britannia which would embark a Python group at Loch Torridon or Oban. Tonfanau Army Camp was temporarily designated as the Python location for Wales with a view to moving the site to the Old College at Aberystwyth University (which housed the university's Department of Physics) as soon as possible. Each dispersed Python group would be supported by dispersed sections of the United Kingdom Supply Agency and the National Air Transport Agency.

In addition, in 1964 the Secretary of State for Scotland ordered three ships – MV Hebrides, MV Clansman and RMS Columba – which were chartered to David MacBrayne as car ferries but could be converted to floating nuclear bunkers in a very short time. They had heavy steel doors to seal the car deck, airtight external windows and doors, decontamination rooms with showers, and external sprinklers to wash away fallout. One or more of these ships would have accompanied RFA Engadine or HMY Britannia from Oban or Mallaig.

The Corsham bunker, given the new codename "Turnstile" from 1963 and "Chanticleer" from 1970, would play an important part in the lead up to war but ceased to have a CGWHQ role other than as a possible aggregation point for Python groups some time after an attack.

== Gallery ==
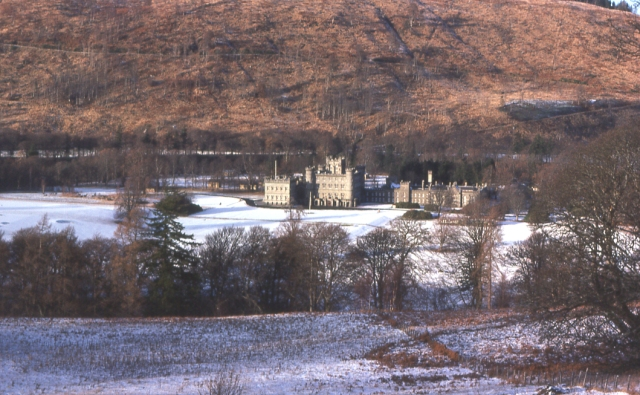
Taymouth Castle, the Python site for Scotland

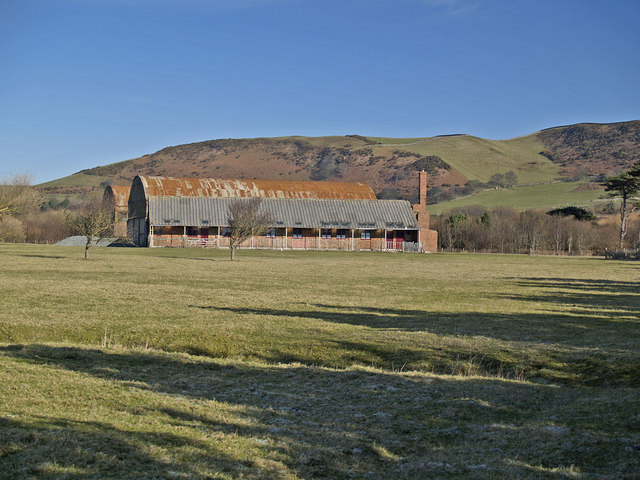
Remains of the Ministry of Defence buildings at Tonfanau, the temporary Python site for Wales

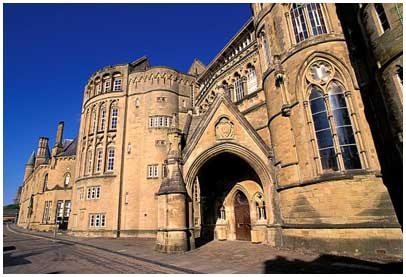
Old College at Aberystwyth University, the later Python site for Wales

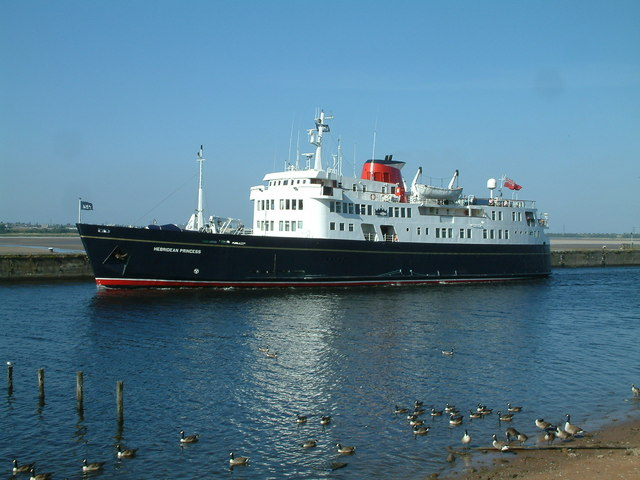
MV Hebridean Princess, formerly RMS Columba, one of three car ferries designed as floating nuclear bunkers

== See also ==
- Regional seat of government
- Operation Candid
- "Pindar" Defence Crisis Management Centre
