= All Arms Junior Leaders' Regiment =

The All Arms Junior Leaders' Regiment (AAJLR) started in May 1959 and was disbanded in August 1966. Located at Tonfanau in North Wales, it trained boys aged between 15 and 17½ as future senior non-commissioned officers from a variety of arms of the British army. It contained boys from most of the Infantry Regiments, Royal Regiment Of Artillery, Royal Armoured Corps, Royal Corps Of Signals, Corps Of Royal Electrical And Mechanical Engineers, Corps Of Royal Engineers, Corps Of Royal Military Police, General Service Corps, Intelligence Corps, Royal Army Ordnance Corps, Royal Army Service Corps, Royal Corps Of Transport, and Royal Pioneer Corps.

In its short life over 2,100 boys graduated to join the regular British Army.
