= Central Government War Headquarters =

Underground complex in Wiltshire, England

Coordinates: 51.42°N 2.22°W

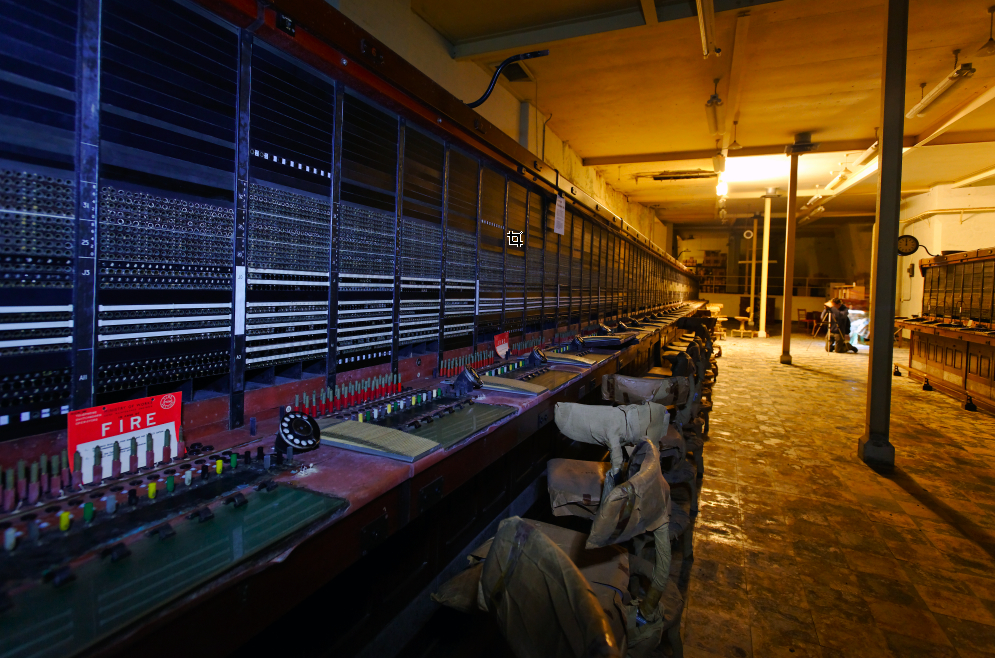
Telephone exchange, Central Government War Headquarters

The Central Government War Headquarters (CGWHQ) is a 35-acre (14 ha) complex built 120 feet (37 m) underground as the United Kingdom's emergency government war headquarters – the hub of the country's alternative seat of power outside London during a nuclear war or conflict with the Soviet Union. It is in Corsham, Wiltshire, in a former Bath stone quarry known as Spring Quarry, under the present-day MoD Corsham. In 1940, during the Second World War, the site was acquired by the Minister of Aircraft Production and used as an underground engine factory. The war headquarters was commissioned in 1955, after approval by Prime Minister Anthony Eden. However, it became outdated shortly after it was built, due to intercontinental ballistic missiles being able to target it, and the formulation of other plans (such as PYTHON). Nevertheless, the complex continued to have a role in war plans and remained in operation for 30 years.

The complex was known variously as "Stockwell", "Subterfuge", "Burlington", "Turnstile", "Chanticleer", "Peripheral", and "Site 3". It was also nicknamed "Hawthorn" by journalist Duncan Campbell, who first revealed its existence in his 1982 book War Plan UK. It was also mentioned by Peter Laurie in his 1979 revised edition of Beneath the City Streets.

== Features ==
Over 1 kilometre (0.62 mi; 3,300 ft) in length, and with over 60 miles (97 km) of roads, the site was designed to accommodate the Prime Minister, the entire Cabinet Office, other civil servants, and domestic support staff.

Blast-proof and self-sufficient, the complex could accommodate up to 4,000 people in complete isolation from the outside world for up to three months. The underground city was equipped with all the facilities needed to survive: from hospitals, canteens, kitchens and laundries to storerooms for supplies, accommodation areas and offices. An underground lake and treatment plant could provide drinking water, and twelve tanks could store the fuel required to keep the four generators in the underground power station running for up to three months. The air within the complex could be kept at a constant humidity and heated to around 20 °C (68 °F). It was also equipped with the second-largest telephone exchange in Britain, a BBC studio from which the PM could address the nation, and an internal Lamson Tube system that could relay messages throughout the complex, using compressed air.

To maintain the secrecy of the site, even during a countdown to war, it was envisaged that 4,000 essential workers would assemble at an outlying destination known as Check Point. Warminster fulfilled this function, and from there a fleet of army lorries would have transported staff to the CGWHQ site. About 210 senior Whitehall officials and their staff, similarly unaware of their destination, were to assemble at Kensington (Olympia) station on the West London line, before setting off by special train for Warminster, then a short trip by bus to Warminster Infantry Training Centre. There they would be broken into small groups to conclude their journey with a 23-mile (37 km) lorry trip to Corsham. The Prime Minister was to remain at Downing Street until the last moment, before being transported to Corsham by helicopter.

The facility was divided into 22 areas. Some areas were repurposed over the years, but the allocation of space in 1981 was as follows:

- Area 1: Air filtration plant (originally the General Post Office area including the telephone exchange)
- Area 2: Royal Air Force Operations Centre (originally offices and dormitories for the Board of Trade, Her Majesty's Stationery Office, Office of Minister for Science and Lord Chancellor's Department)
- Area 3: Royal Air Force offices and dormitory
- Area 4: Dormitory
- Area 5: Dormitory and stores
- Area 6: Kitchen and bakery
- Area 7: Canteen
- Area 8: Telephone exchange
- Area 9: Hospital and stores (originally a dormitory)
- Area 10: Ministry of Transport offices
- Area 11: Water treatment and stores
- Area 12: Canteen and laundry
- Area 13: Ministry of Power and Ministry of Agriculture offices and dormitory
- Area 14: Prime Minister, War Cabinet, Cabinet Secretariat and Chiefs of Staff offices and dormitory
- Area 15: Camp Commandant, Establishment offices and Lamson room
- Area 16: Central Office of Information, Ministry of Health, Home Office, Ministry of Housing and Local Government and BBC studio
- Area 17: Ministry of Labour offices and "special accommodation" suites
- Area 18: Admiralty, British Army and Ministry of Defence offices
- Area 19: Workshops and power generation
- Area 20: Stores
- Area 21: Communications centre
- Area 22: Foreign Office offices and dormitory

In addition, there were water and fuel storage areas adjacent to the water treatment and power generation areas respectively, not officially numbered but sometimes referred to as Areas 23 and 24.

The "special accommodation" suites in Area 17 were larger than the others and were finished to a higher standard, each having private bathroom facilities rather than the communal facilities elsewhere. These suites are believed to have been intended for the Royal Family.

== Scheduled monuments ==
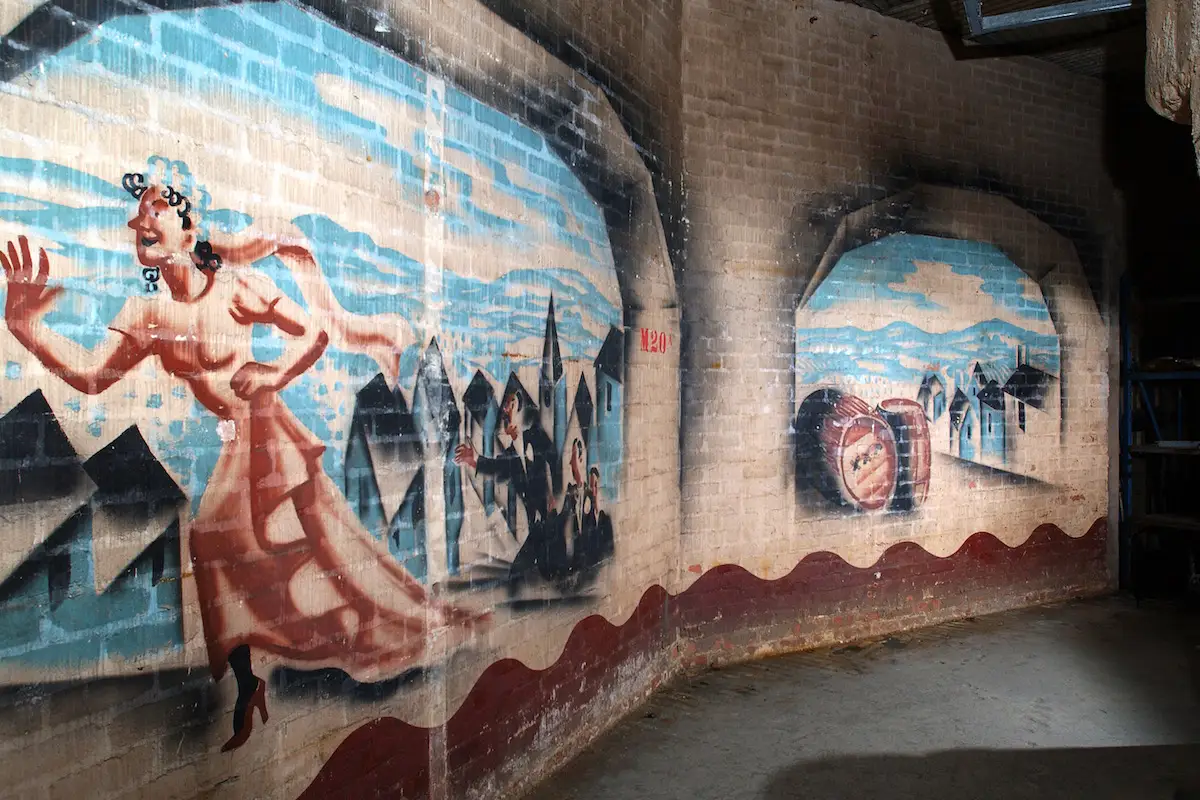
Canteen paintings circa 1943 by Olga Lehmann

In 2013, parts of CGWHQ were made scheduled monuments relating to Cold War history. Additionally a number of underground murals painted by Olga Lehmann are Grade II* listed. East to west, they are:

- Tunnel Quarry
- Slope Shaft (Emergency Exit) A
- Kitchen, Canteen, Laundry, Dining and Washroom areas
- Prime Minister's Rooms and Operations Rooms
- Radio Studio
- GPO Telephone Exchange
- Lamson Terminus Room and associated Fan Room
- Quarry Operations Centre murals

== Post-Cold War ==
In 1989, part of the complex was sold to Octavian Wines for use to store wines at a consistent temperature and humidity level. In 2012, the company provided cellarage for about 12 million bottles which were reported to be worth over £1bn.

At the end of the Cold War, in 1991, the rest of the still-unused complex was taken over by the Ministry of Defence and kept on standby in case of future nuclear threats to the UK.

In December 2004, with the underground reservoir drained, fuel and other supplies removed, and staffing reduced to a skeleton staff of four, the site was decommissioned. In October 2005, it became public that the Ministry of Defence was putting the site up for sale in a package deal that included the CGWHQ with the military base above it. Proposed uses included a "massive data store for City [financial] firms or the biggest wine cellar in Europe".

In October 2015, certain areas of the complex including the telephone exchange were put on the Historic England Heritage at Risk Register due to their immediate threat of being lost or damaged beyond recognition.

== See also ==
- Civil Contingencies Secretariat
- RAF Rudloe Manor
- MoD Corsham
- Corsham Computer Centre
- Python plan
- "Pindar" Defence Crisis Management Centre
