= Strath Committee =

1954–55 British committee on nuclear warfare

The Strath Committee, chaired by Sir William Strath, was set up by the British Ministry of Defence to consider the short- and long-term effects of a hydrogen bomb attack on the United Kingdom. The committee began its work in November 1954, and submitted a preliminary report to Defence Minister Harold Macmillan a month later. The final report was issued in March 1955; while it was officially known as "The Defence Implications of Fall-Out from a Hydrogen Bomb: Report by a Group of Officials", the report is normally cited as the Strath Report instead.

== Content ==
Consisting of thirty-two pages plus appendices, the report established that, if war broke out, the Soviet Union would seek to "eliminate [Britain] from the contest" due to the country possessing a nuclear arsenal as well as hosting American nuclear weapons. The report sought to estimate the degree of damage and casualties that would be suffered from a "limited" attack of ten hydrogen bombs, each with a 10 megaton payload, dropped on British cities. The attack was assumed to take place during the night (and thus at a time when vigilance would be lower) and without any defence preparations being made in advance. The result of the hypothetical attack would be "utter devastation" and sixteen million casualties; just one bomb was deemed sufficient to wipe out a typical city and "all, or nearly all, its inhabitants". While London would not be completely destroyed, it alone would suffer four million casualties. Since Britain would be disproportionately affected by collateral damage due to its small landmass and high population density, the combined effect of all ten bombs would be one where life and property was "obliterated by blast and fire on a vast scale"; there would be up to twelve million deaths (with more than nine million of these resulting from blast and heat and less than three million from radiation poisoning) and a further four million people would be seriously injured or disabled, overwhelming the remnants of the medical system. These casualties would amount to one third of Britain's population and would include a "disproportionate share" of the skilled manpower that would be needed for national recovery. While forty million survivors were predicted, thirteen million of these would have to shelter in place for at least a week before radiation fell to safe levels. Half of Britain's industry would be destroyed, logistics and distribution systems would break down, and food, farmland, and water would all be contaminated, leaving the survivors in "siege conditions." From a military standpoint, the country would cease to be strategically significant.

In more highly contaminated areas, people would be isolated "not merely from the less contaminated areas but from one another. The household would become the unit of survival", with food and water limited to whatever was held by individual families. In some areas, local military commanders would have to assist or even take over from the usual civilian authorities for the purposes of restoring and maintaining order and potentially use "drastic" measures to do so. With the population facing disease, starvation, and "unimaginable psychological effects", and with the country's social and economic fabric destroyed, the report could not predict whether Britain could survive the initial critical period that would follow even this limited attack. If the initial period was survived, the Committee believed that it would be possible for Britain to make a slow recovery with the use of remaining resources and that living standards, "although substantially lower than at present, would still be well above that of the greater part of the world." Even so, it warned that "fallout, combined with the vast explosive power of the hydrogen bomb, presents problems of a revolutionary character for the defence of this country and a threat of the utmost gravity to our survival" and that no part of Britain could be truly safe from nuclear attack.

== Impact ==
The report would inform various aspects of British civil defence and continuity-of-government planning including the development of the Python plan and the regional and local seats of government. The report did not believe mass evacuation of civilians to be a viable precaution since there would be too little time between an attack warning being issued and the actual attack commencing for this to work, and in any case building the requisite numbers of fallout shelters would be prohibitively expensive, though young children and their mothers, expectant mothers, and the elderly and infirm could be moved to designated evacuation areas during the transition to war period, some degree of general evacuation activity could be undertaken with a view to "levelling out risk", and essential workers could be dispersed on a local basis (that is to say, they would perform their usual shift in a high-risk area and then commute to safer areas). The report recommended that refuge rooms be set up to protect households against blast, heat, and fallout; indeed, it urged the government to make such rooms a requirement for all new housing projects, though this would fall through on cost grounds. The report was discussed in a Ministry of Defence paper entitled "An Appreciation of the Likely Form and Duration of a Future Major War: With Reference to the Problem of Stockpiling in the United Kingdom" (DEFE 5/80, COS (57) 278, 18 December 1957); at a time when the final size of Britain's nuclear weapon stockpile was being debated, the report was seen to demonstrate that only a small number of weapons were needed to achieve a deterrence effect.

The nature of the Strath Committee's report meant that it would not be declassified until April 2002.
