= Bedford RL =

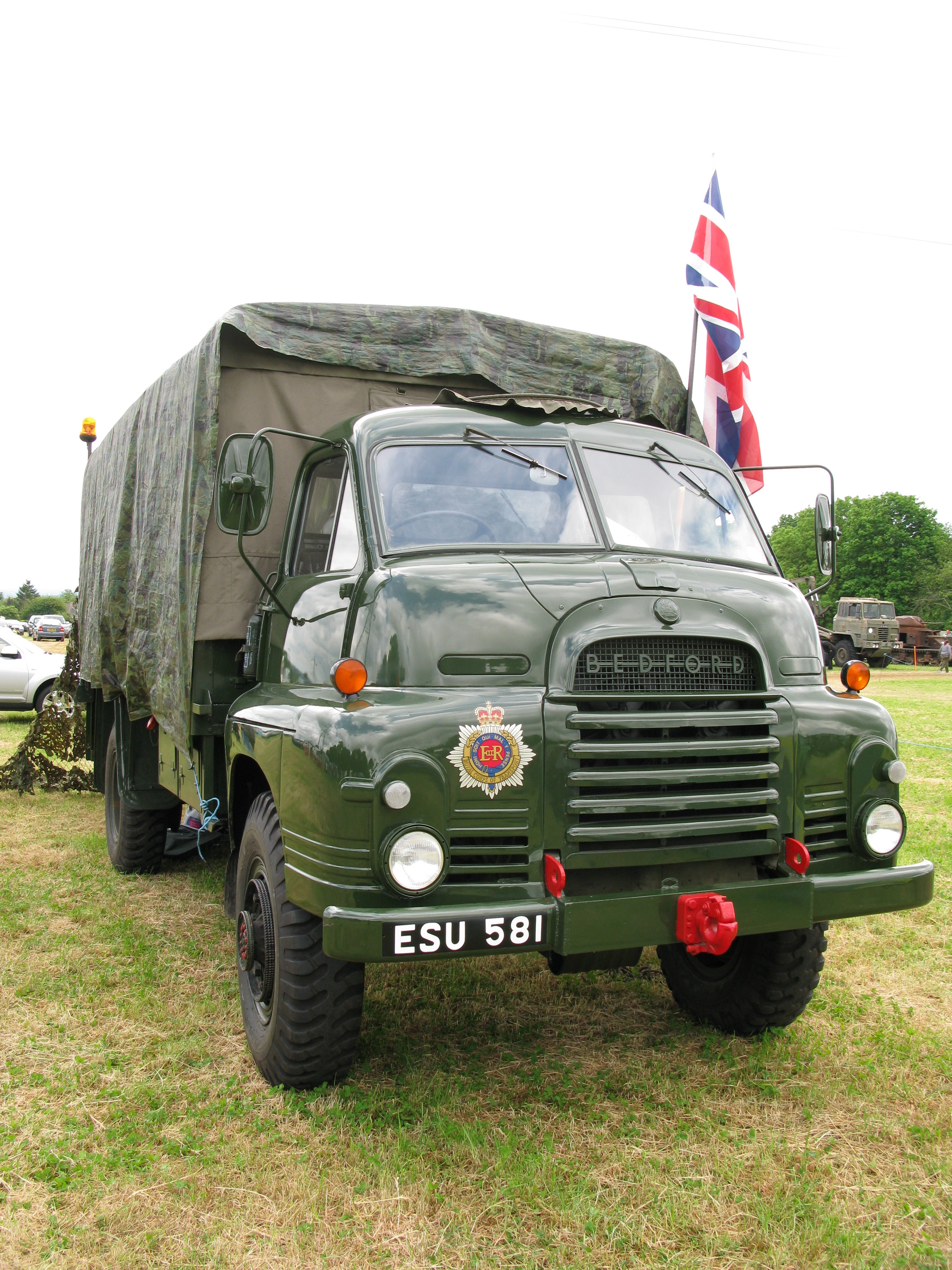

Overview
- Manufacturer: Bedford
- Production: 1953–early 1970s

Body and chassis
- Class: Commercial vehicle, military vehicle
- Body style: chassis cab, flatbed, troop carrier, fire engine, recovery vehicle
- Layout: Longitudinal front engine, rear-wheel drive (4x2), or four-wheel drive (4x4)
- Related: Bedford S type, Bedford RLHZ Self Propelled Pump, aka Green Goddess

Powertrain
- Engine: 4.9 L 110 bhp I6 petrol
- Transmission: 4-speed manual

Dimensions
- Wheelbase: 3.962 m (13 ft 0 in)
- Length: 6.36 m (20 ft 10 in)
- Width: 2.39 m (7 ft 10 in)
- Height: 2.602 m (8 ft 6.4 in) (at cap)
- Kerb weight: 4.4 tons (empty)

The Bedford RL was the British Armed Forces main medium lorry, built by Bedford from the mid-1950s until the late 1960s. The lorry was based on the civilian Bedford S type. It superseded the Bedford QL, and in turn was superseded by the Bedford MK.

== History ==
The Bedford RL was based on the Bedford SCL, a civilian 7-ton truck. The military version had all wheel drive and bigger wheels to increase ground clearance. Originally conservatively rated at 3 tons, all RL GS (general service) trucks in British Military service were, at a late stage in their service lives, re-rated at 4 tons without any mechanical modifications; the weight referring to its rated cross country payload weight. The first was completed in May 1951. The last RL rolled off the production line in the early 1970s, a total of 73.135 being produced.

== Engine ==
The RL was powered by a 4.927 litres (300.7 cu in) petrol engine producing 110–133 brake horsepower (82–99 kW; 112–135 PS), although some were fitted with diesel engines.

== Variants ==
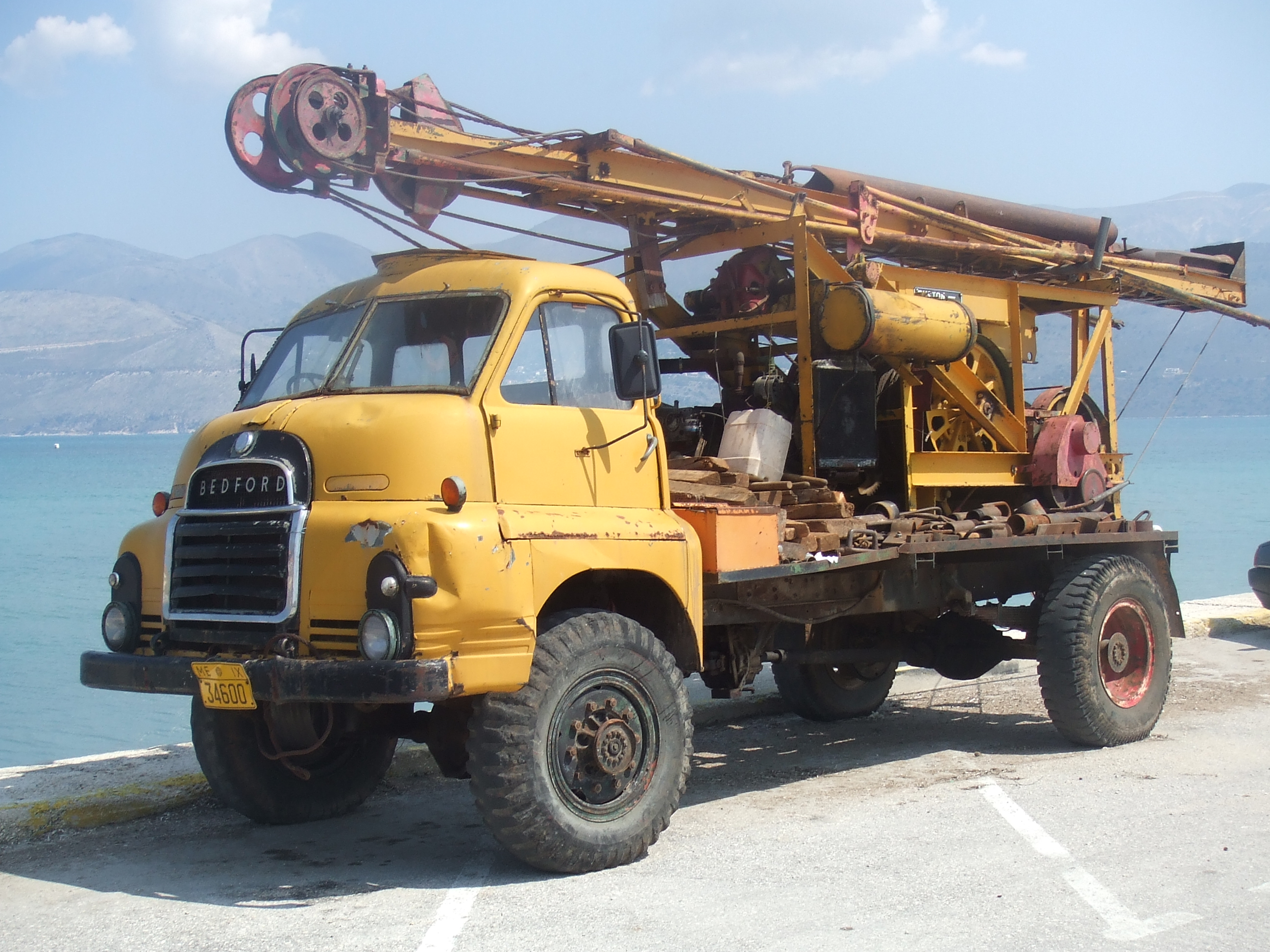
Bedford 4WD chassis cab with a chassis mounted drilling rig by Ruston-Bucyrus

Many specialist variants were also built; including recovery vehicles, mobile workshops, radio vans and cable layers. The Green Goddess fire engine was also based on the RL.

The RL and variants continued to serve alongside the later Bedford MK and Bedford TM trucks until well into the 1990s.

The Home Office also purchased a large number of these vehicles, kept in reserve for any national emergency. All have now since been disposed of, many having less than 2,000 miles (3,220 km) on the clock.

In Australia, R series Bedfords were used during the 1960s, 1970s and early 1980s by Victoria's Country Fire Authority (CFA). They were built as 800 gallon water capacity, four wheel drive bushfire tankers and designated "State Spare Tankers". Considerably larger and with greater water capacity than CFA's standard Bedford, Leyland, BMC, Austin and International brand rural fire attack tankers, they were spread thinly throughout the state to bolster their smaller workmates. Most were painted in CFA's standard carnation red. They were fitted with rear-mounted, British-built Godiva pumps rated at approximately 2,250 litres per minute output.

== Users ==
=== Malaysia ===
Malaysian Armed Forces - mid-1960s to middle-1980s. Primarily used for logistic purpose like troop and ammunition transporter. There are two rows of wooden bench seating along the entire length of the bed, lining along the right and left bed edge. Seat faces inside and each other. Seating compartment provided with rain/sun tarpaulin cover supported by steel-tube frame. Drivers' cab could seat two (including the driver). The difference from military model and civilian model is machinegunner hatch on the roof and 4x4 features. These useful trucks were slowly phased out by a Mercedes-Benz L series 4x4 truck and Hino Ranger TK during the 1970s and 1980s. The Bedford RL endured in the Konfrontasi conflict and Second Malaysian Insurgency.

=== Singapore ===
The Singapore Armed Forces operated the vehicle from mid-1960s to late-1970s. Primarily used to transport troops, and logistics such as food. One circa 1970s infantry platoon including the platoon 60mm mortar team could fit into one lorry. There are two rows of wooden bench seating along the entire length of the bed, lining along the right and left bed edge. Seat faces inside and each other. Seating compartment provided with rain/sun cover supported by steel-tube frame. Drivers' cab could seat two (including the driver). These lorries were likely handed-down from the British military that were still present in Singapore after Singapore gained independence in 1965; withdrawing completely by 1971. These lorries were slowly phased out by a slightly larger Mercedes lorry during the 1970s. The handed-down Bedford and the replacement Mercedes were referred to as the "3-tonner" by Singapore Armed Forces personnel.

=== New Zealand ===
The Bedford RL was the New Zealand military's main medium truck from 1958 to 1989. Built under licence in New Zealand, the RL served the New Zealand Military in New Zealand and South East Asia. The RL was replaced by the Unimog family of vehicles. The New Zealand Army used the RL GS, Tipper, Recovery and Mobile workshops versions.
