= Cadillac Escalade =

Full-size luxury SUV by Cadillac

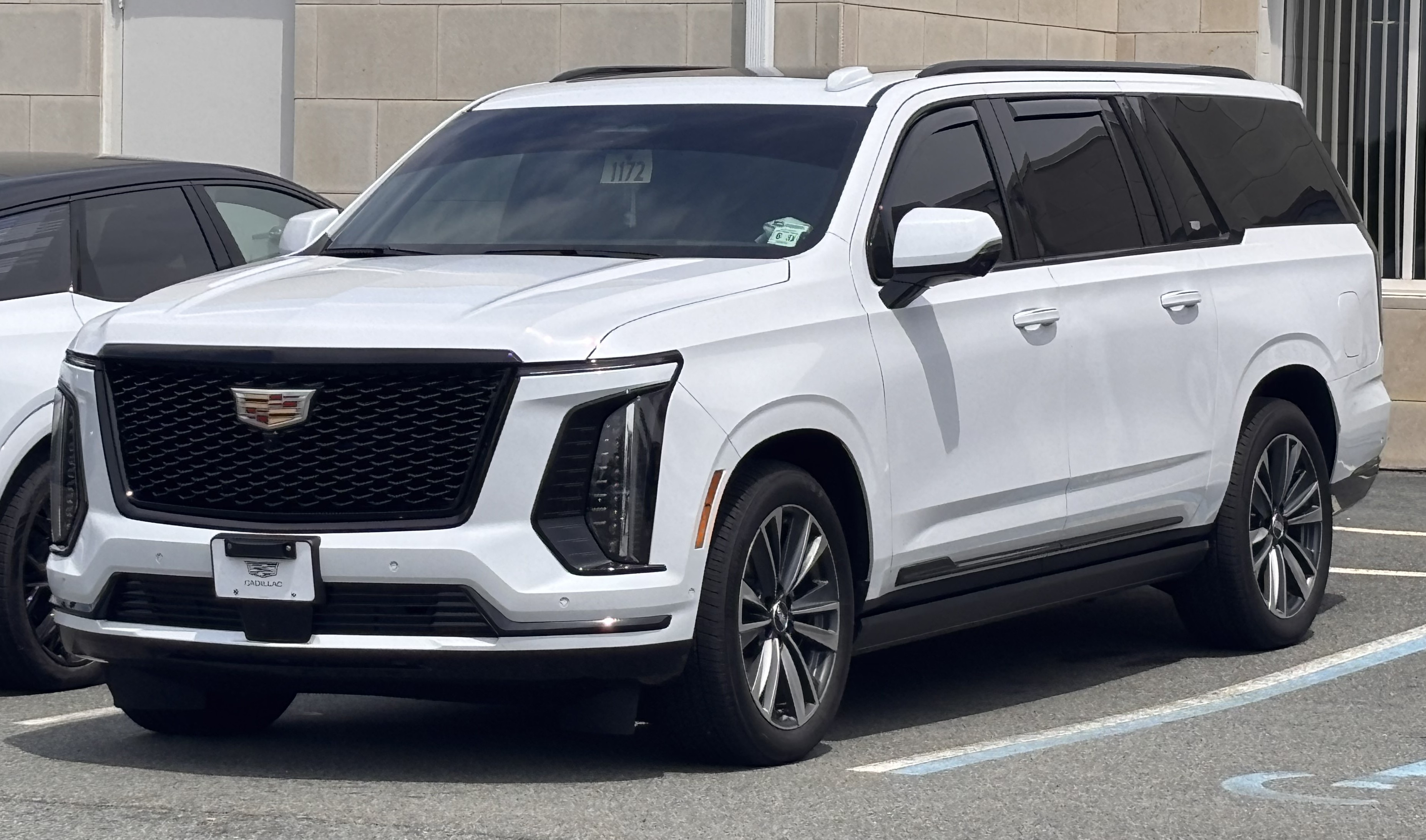
- Fifth generation Cadillac Escalade

Overview
- Manufacturer: Cadillac (General Motors)
- Production: 1998–present 2002–present (ESV); 2001–2013 (EXT); 2008–2013 (Hybrid)
- Model years: 1999–2000; 2002–present

Body and chassis
- Class: Full-size luxury SUV
- Layout: FR (Front-engine, rear-wheel drive); F4 (Front-engine, four-wheel drive)
- Chassis: Body-on-frame
- Related: Chevrolet Suburban/GMC Yukon XL; Chevrolet Tahoe/GMC Yukon

The Cadillac Escalade is a full-size luxury SUV manufactured by General Motors and marketed by Cadillac as its first major entry into the SUV market. The Escalade was introduced for the 1999 model year in response to an influx of new luxury SUVs during the late 1990s, including the Mercedes-Benz M-Class, Range Rover, Lexus LX, and Lincoln Navigator. The Escalade project went into production only ten months after it was approved. The Escalade is built at Arlington Assembly in Arlington, Texas.

The term "escalade" refers to a siege warfare tactic of scaling defensive walls or ramparts with the aid of ladders or siege towers. More generally, it is a French word which is the noun-equivalent form of the French verb escalader, which means "to climb or scale".

The Escalade is currently sold in North America and select international markets (Europe and Asia) where Cadillac has official sales channels. The Escalade ESV (Escalade Stretch Vehicle) is sold in North America, Russia, and the Middle East, but is only available by special order in some international markets. The right-hand-drive Escalade and Escalade ESV are available through third-party conversion specialists without official agreement with Cadillac in Australian, Oceanic, and Japanese markets.

On August 8, 2023, GM presented the Escalade IQ, an all-electric version of the Escalade, and the third model in Cadillac's EV line, after the Celestiq and Lyriq. It went on sale in late 2024 for the 2025 model year, with a starting price of $130,000.

The Escalade has gone through five generations and one facelift, with the most recent (the fifth generation) introduced in 2021, noted for its technology and self-driving capability. The fifth-generation Escalade is nearly two meters high, and was criticized by The Verge for its excessive size and hazard to pedestrians.

== First generation (1998) ==
GMT 400
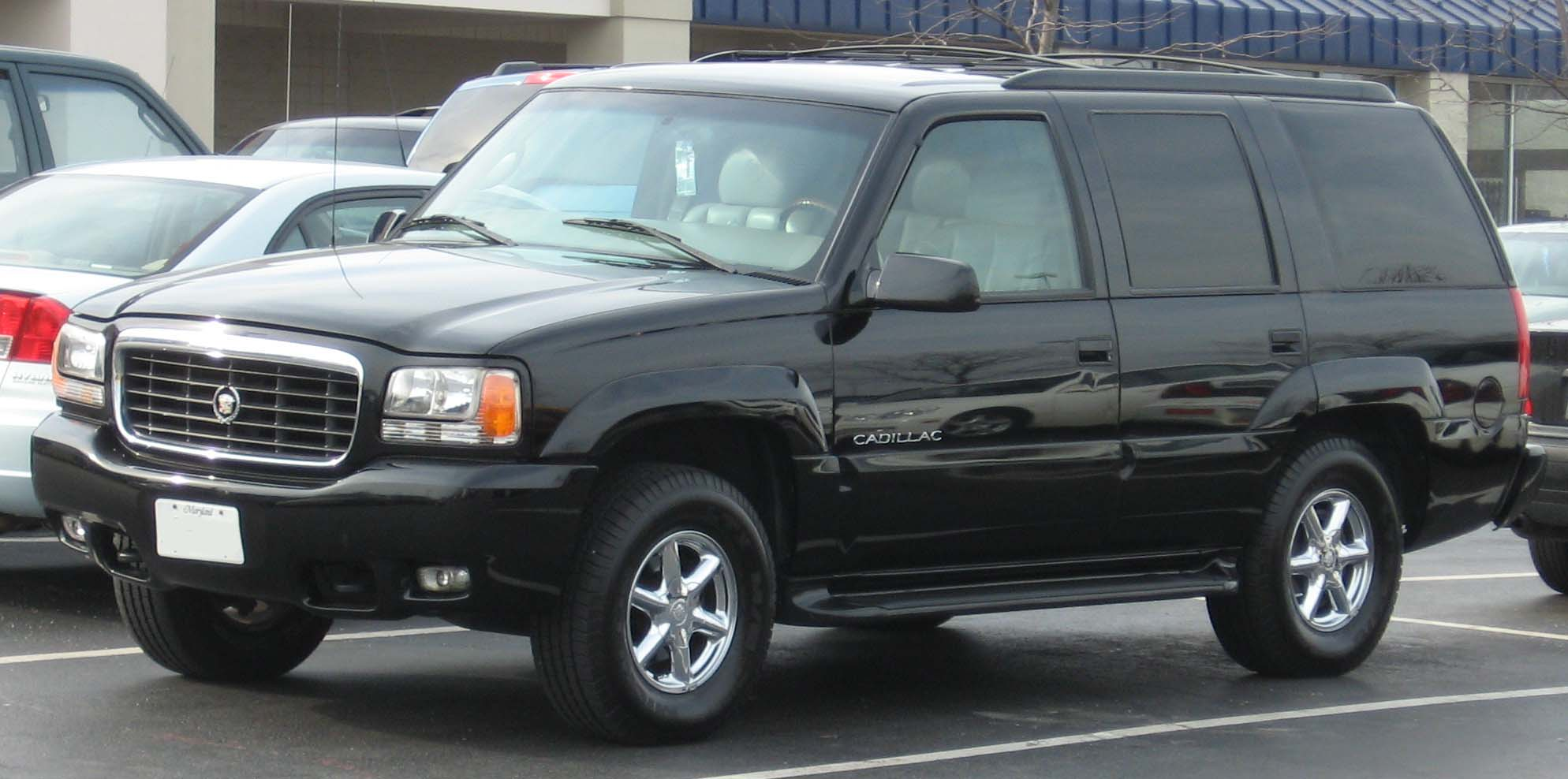

Overview
- Production: August 1998–2000
- Model years: 1999–2000
- Assembly: United States: Arlington, Texas (Arlington Assembly)
- Designer: Wayne Cherry (1997)

Body and chassis
- Body style: 5-door SUV
- Layout: F4 (Front-engine, four-wheel drive)
- Platform: GMT435
- Related: Chevrolet Suburban; Chevrolet Tahoe; GMC Yukon

Powertrain
- Engine: 5.7 L L31 V8 (gasoline)
- Transmission: 4-speed 4L60-E automatic

Dimensions
- Wheelbase: 117.5 in (2,984 mm)
- Length: 201.2 in (5,110 mm)
- Width: 77.0 in (1,956 mm)
- Height: 74.3 in (1,887 mm)

The introduction of the Lincoln Navigator in the 1998 model year necessitated that General Motors be able to compete in the burgeoning American market for full-size luxury-type trucks. This generation was only a five-seat (two-row) SUV. Fearing the growing hegemony of the Navigator, the Escalade was rushed through the design process to reach dealers quickly. Essentially little more than a badge-engineered GMC Yukon Denali, the SUV's aesthetics were similar to the Denali, and the final vehicle was smaller than the Navigator. The Escalade's underpinnings were borrowed from the Yukon Denali line, with the GMC logos on the center caps replaced with Cadillac's crest. The Escalade also used the same 5.7L Vortec 5700 V8 at 255 hp (190 kW) as found in all other GMT400-based models, which was underpowered compared to the Navigator's 300 hp (224 kW) and 365 lb⋅ft (495 N⋅m) 5.4L InTech V8. All first-generation Escalades and Denalis featured Auto-Trac selectable 4×4. The 1999–2000 Escalade achieved 11 mpg_{‑US} (21 L/100 km) city and 15 mpg_{‑US} (16 L/100 km) highway based on U.S. EPA test protocols.

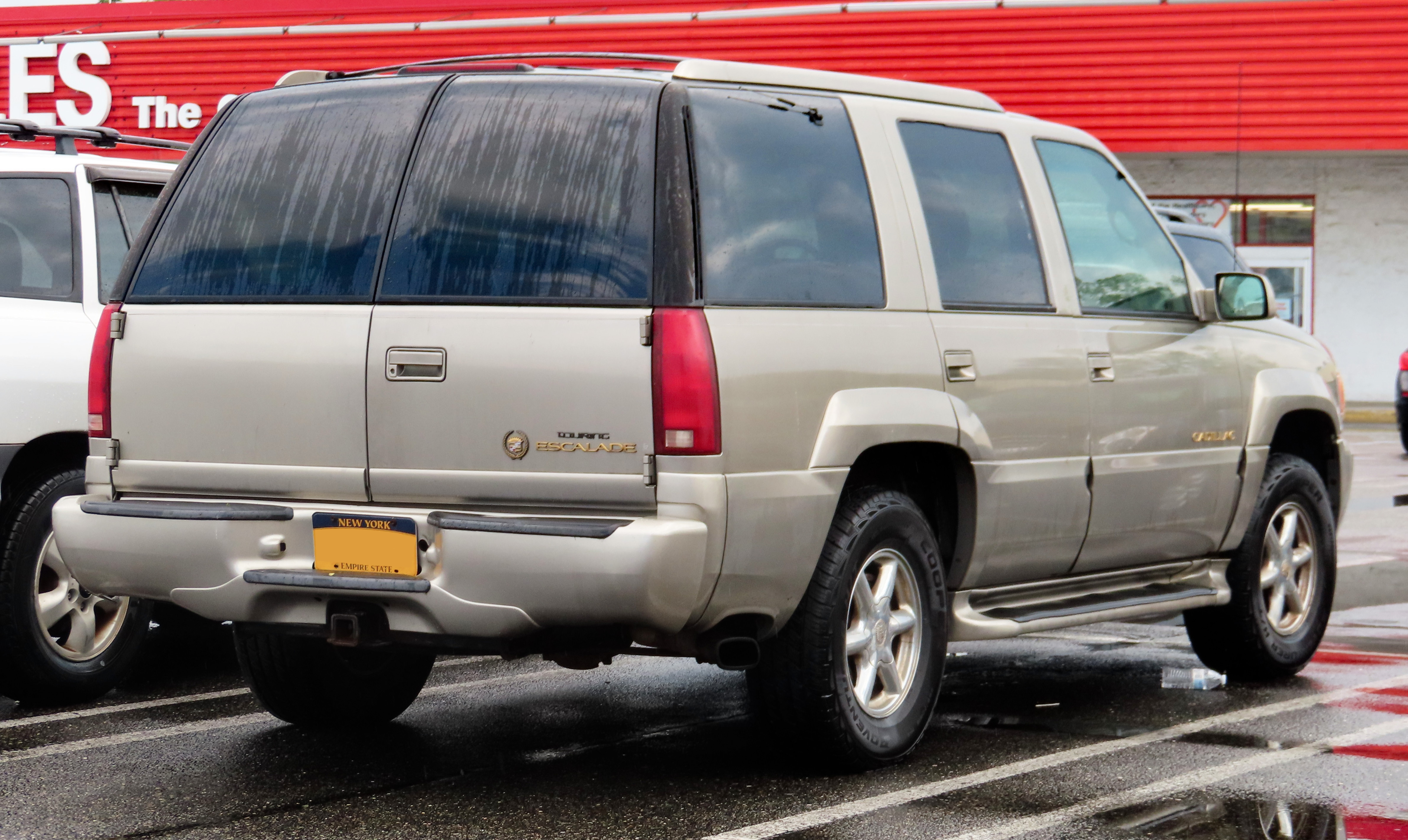
2000 Cadillac Escalade rear

The first-generation Escalade (as well as its mechanically identical twin, the GMC Yukon Denali), was available only in the short-wheelbase four-door wagon configuration with few options. The GMC Yukon Denali was heavily differentiated from the standard Yukon models, with a unique front hood, fenders, grille, headlamps and bumper cover, color-keyed mirrors and door handles, a unique paint-matched roof rack and running boards, and lower paint-matched cladding all around with embossed emblems. The only exterior differences for the Escalade (other than badging) were a slightly different grille treatment and smooth cladding with emblems placed on the sheet metal. The interior design, however, would differ significantly between the two models. Denali already added unique two-tone seats, genuine zebrano wood trim on the front-window switch panels and unique center console, chromed interior door handles, "Yukon Denali" embroidery on the door panels, a color-keyed steering wheel, and a unique instrument cluster versus the standard Yukon. The Escalade would add additional real wood trim on all four-door panels and the steering wheel, imitation wood on the instrument panel, and "Cadillac" script on the console veneer, a color-keyed steering column, a leather-wrapped column shifter, and unique front and rear seats with perforated leather, a Cadillac crest embroidered on the headrests, and a storage compartment in the rear seat armrest.

Both vehicles included a generous amount of standard equipment not available on other GM full-size SUVs, including 16-inch chrome-clad aluminum-alloy wheels, a Bose Acoustimass seven-speaker stereo (including subwoofer), an in-dash CD player and console-mounted six-CD changer, auto-dimming exterior and rearview mirrors with compass and temperature display, automatic headlamps with daytime running lights, front projector fog lamps, heated front and rear seats, rear-seat audio controls, a BCM (body control module) providing functions such as retained accessory power and interior illumination fade-off, a unique warning chime, a special coating used on the dashboard for a more premium appearance, front and rear Bilstein shock absorbers, and unique engine and transmission tuning for a more refined driving experience. An OnStar in-vehicle telematics and communications system was optional on the Denali but standard on the Escalade, with the only other option for both models being a choice between twin rear barn doors or a split tailgate with rear-window wiper. A dealer-installed cellular telephone was also available with factory provisions in the center console.

Colors available on the Escalade were Silver Sand Metallic, Sable Black, Aspen White, and Bordeaux Red Metallic. All Escalades came with a Neutral Shale interior. Yukon Denali colors shared with the Escalade were named Black Onyx and Dark Toreador Red Metallic, and exclusive colors to the Denali were Silvermist Metallic, Spruce Green Metallic, Meadow Green Metallic, and Gold Metallic. The Denali featured a two-tone interior available in Canyon Tan or Stone Gray.

While the base MSRP of the 2000 GMC Yukon Denali increased to US$43,535 (up $460 from $43,075 in 1999), the Cadillac Escalade retained a base MSRP of $46,225 in both 1999 and 2000.

General Motors retains the first Cadillac Escalade produced at Arlington Assembly in 1998, a 1999 Aspen White model, in its Heritage Collection, VIN # 400001.

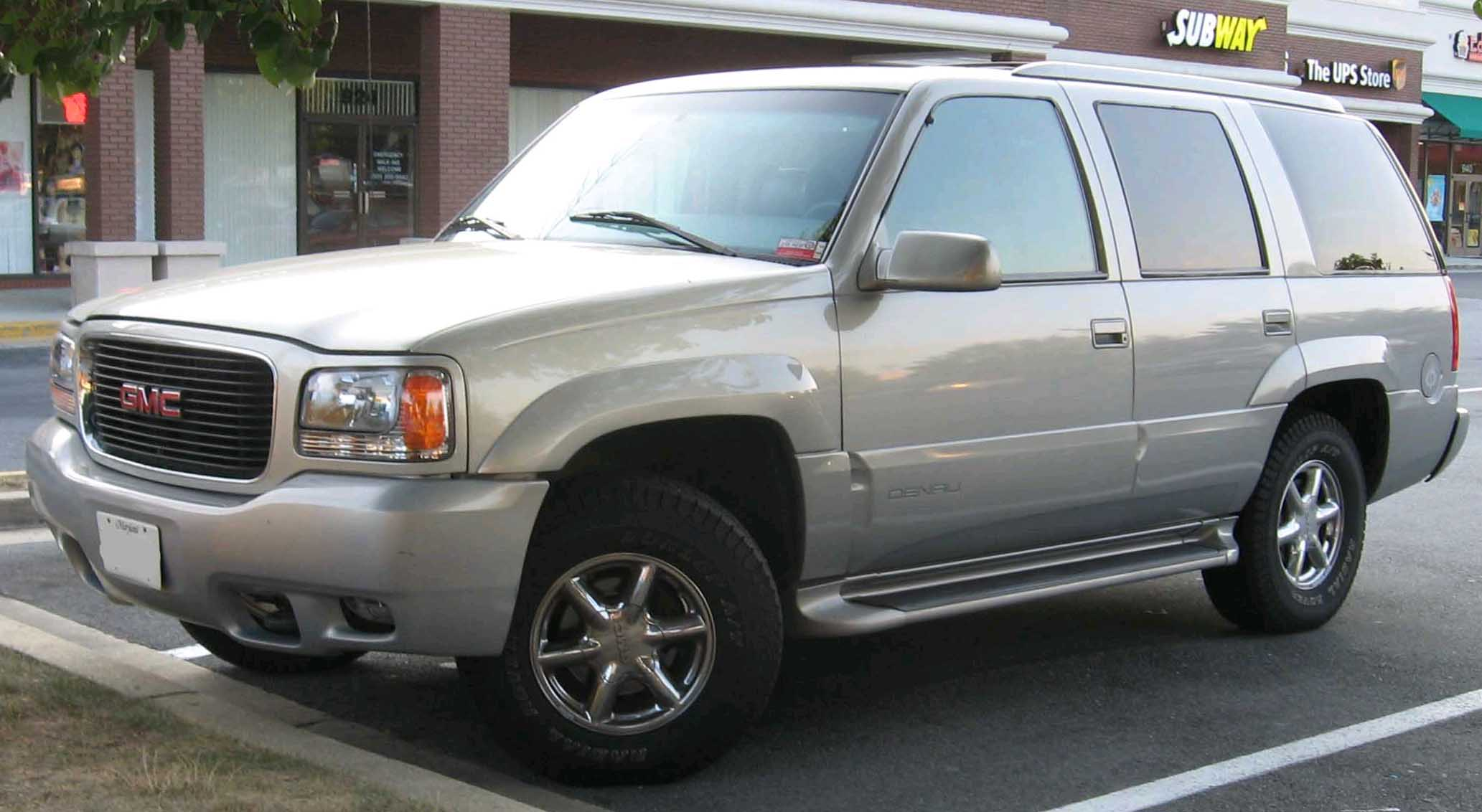
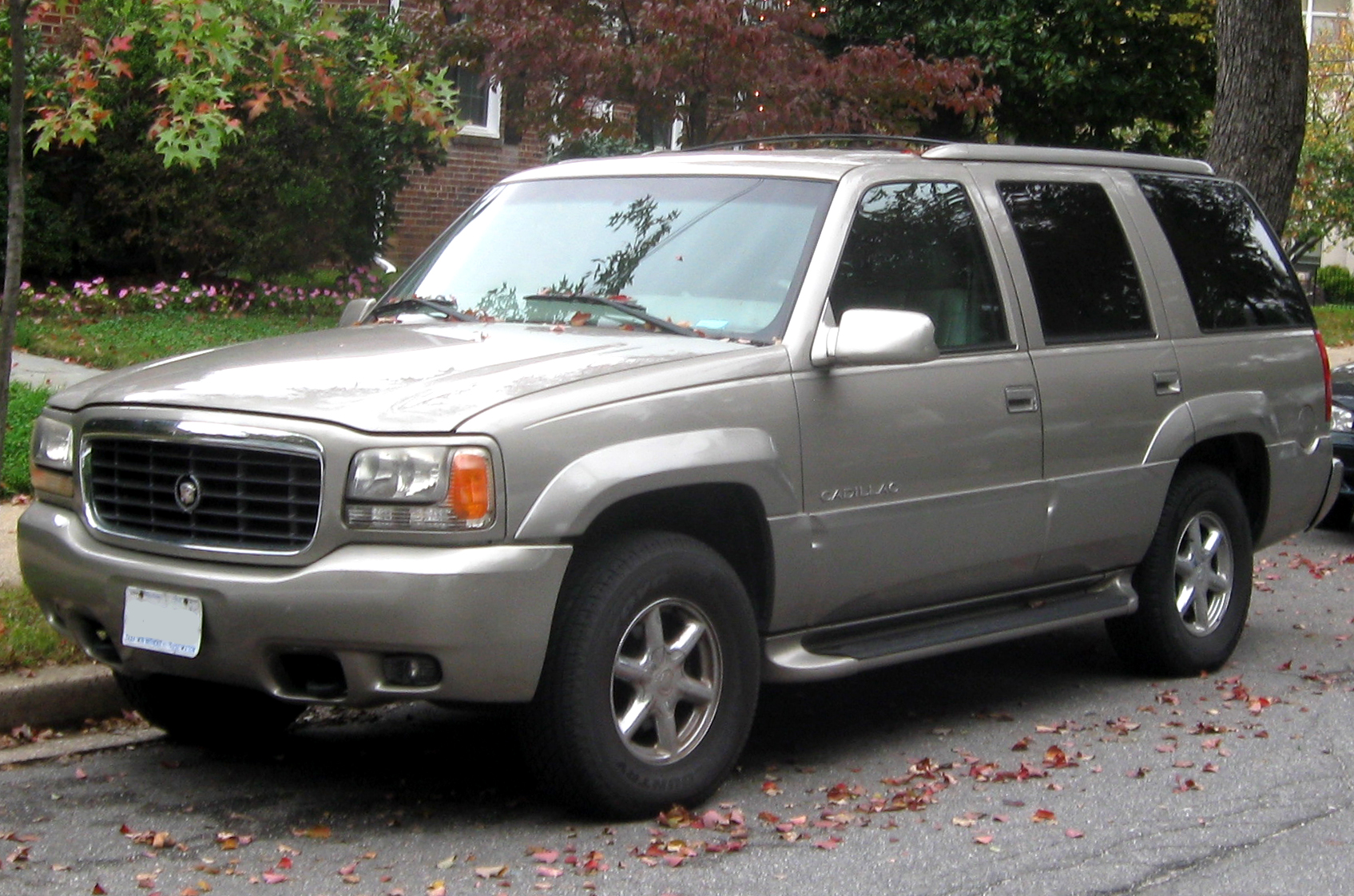
GMT400 GMC Yukon Denali (left) was nearly identical to the Cadillac Escalade (right).

== Second generation (2001) ==
GMT 800
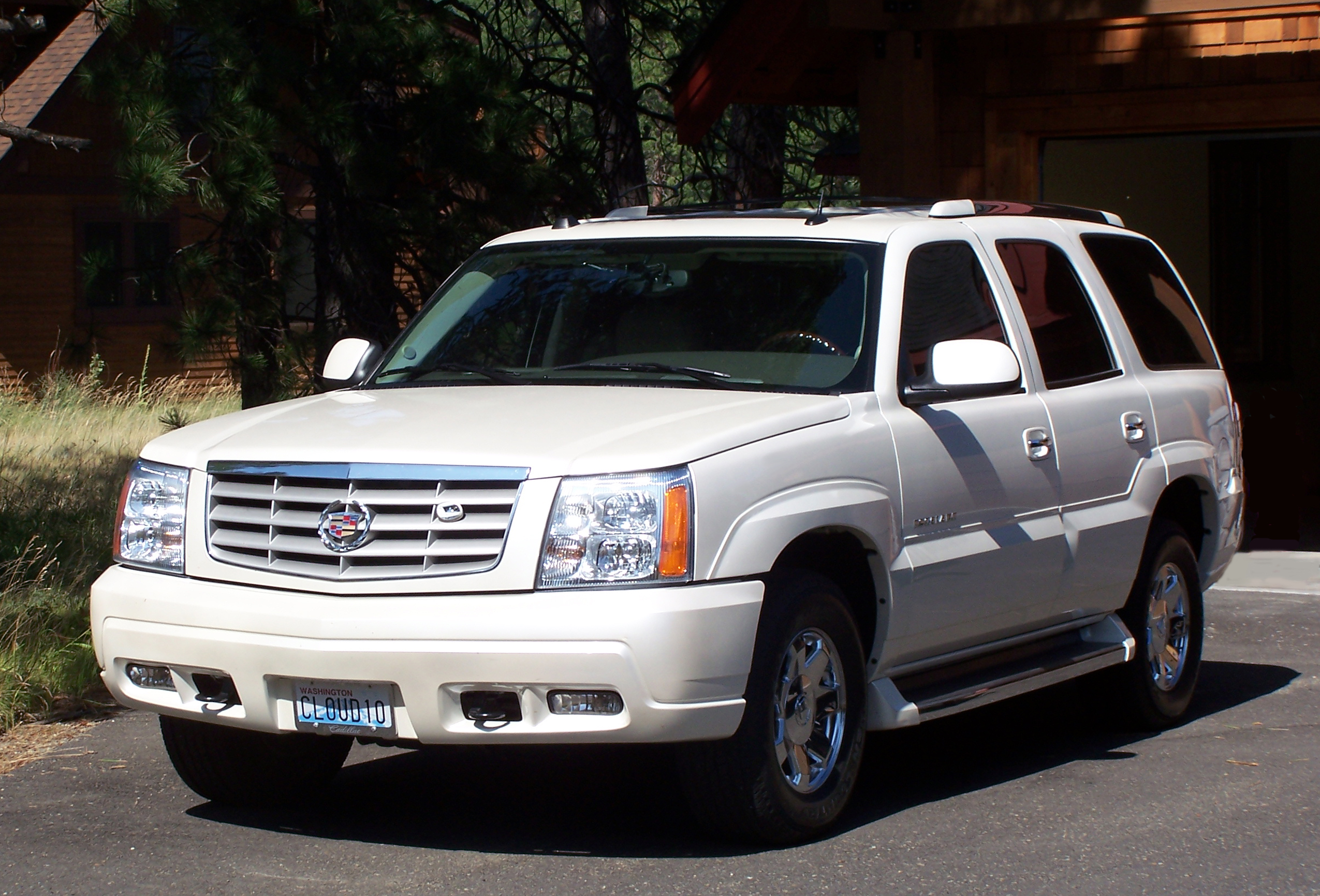
- 2005 Cadillac Escalade

Overview
- Production: January 2001–2006 (Escalade); September 2001–2006 (EXT); December 2002–2006 (ESV)
- Model years: 2002–2006; 2003–2006 (ESV)
- Assembly: United States: Arlington, Texas (Arlington Assembly; standard length only); Mexico: Silao, Guanajuato (Silao Assembly; ESV and EXT only); Russia: Kaliningrad (Avtotor)
- Designer: Wayne Cherry (1998)

Body and chassis
- Body style: 5-door SUV; 4-door sport utility truck
- Layout: FR (Front-engine, rear-wheel drive); F4 (Front-engine, four-wheel drive)
- Platform: GMT826; GMT836 (Escalade ESV)
- Related: Chevrolet Avalanche; Chevrolet Suburban; Chevrolet Tahoe; GMC Yukon/Yukon XL; Hummer H2

Powertrain
- Engine: 5.3 L LM7 V8; 6.0 L LQ9 V8
- Transmission: 4-speed 4L60-E automatic (RWD); 4-speed 4L65-E automatic (AWD)

Dimensions
- Wheelbase: 116.0 in (2,946 mm); 130.0 in (3,302 mm) (ESV)
- Length: 198.9 in (5,052 mm); 221.4 in (5,624 mm) (ESV)
- Width: 78.9 in (2,004 mm); 79.5 in (2,019 mm) (ESV)
- Height: 76.5 in (1,943 mm); 75.7 in (1,923 mm) (ESV); 75.0 in (1,905 mm) (ESV Platinum)
- Curb weight: 5,800 lb (2,631 kg)

Unlike its Chevrolet and GMC siblings, which launched for the 2000 model year, Cadillac delayed the Escalade's switch to the GMT820 chassis until February 2001 as a 2002 model, the last of the three General Motors full-size truck and SUV brands to switch to the new chassis. Cadillac unveiled the 2002 model year Escalade in August 2000 at Pebble Beach, while continuing to sell the 2000 models. Rear-wheel drive was standard, as was a 5.3L V8. All-wheel drive was standard on the ESV (until 2008 for the third generation) and EXT, and was optional on the short-wheelbase Escalade. The special high-output Vortec 6.0L V8 engine was the sole engine choice on all-wheel-drive models, and from mid-year 2005, all Escalades came with the high-output 6.0L Vortec V8. All models (except for the EXT) offered seating for up to eight passengers.

For 2003, the "StabiliTrak" electronic stability control system was upgraded to a four-wheel version, and High-Intensity Discharge (HID) low beam headlights, power-adjustable pedals, and turn-signal mirrors became standard, along with a Bulgari-branded clock. For 2004, XM Satellite Radio, second-row bucket seats, and a tire pressure monitoring system were made standard on all Escalades except the EXT. Also in 2004, the Platinum Edition Escalade ESV was introduced at a base price of $71,025 (equivalent to $121,065 in 2025). It featured the luxury utility segment's first factory-installed 20-inch chrome wheels, a chrome grille, a slightly lowered suspension, and an interior with an ebony-and-shale dashboard, shale leather upholstery, pleated door panel bolsters, heated and cooled seats (front and back), heated and cooled cup holders, moon roof, and second- and third-row monitors. The OnStar system was upgraded for the 2005 model year from an analog to a digital system.

In 2003, a year after their introduction, the GMT800-based Escalade and Escalade EXT received an interior facelift, while the exterior design was left mostly unchanged. The audio system was upgraded to offer two different radio options: an AM/FM radio with cassette and single-disc CD players, or an AM/FM radio with a single-disc CD player and a touchscreen GPS navigation system (Radio Data System was also included with both radios). Both radio options included a separate six-disc, in-dash CD changer unit mounted in the lower portion of the instrument panel and controlled via the radio (the CD changer still featured numbered buttons for disc selection, as well as "Load" and "Eject" buttons). The Driver Information Center (DIC) was moved from a separate unit in the instrument panel to the odometer display screen in the instrument cluster, where the gauges were also revised with the larger odometer display screen. XM Satellite Radio became available, and the OnStar telematics system controls were relocated from the instrument panel to the electrochromic inside rearview mirror (ISRV). A rear-seat DVD entertainment system, which included two pairs of wireless headphones, and was produced by Panasonic, was also a new option for the 2003 model year. The instrument panel and steering wheel both featured updated designs (the steering wheel now also featured a remote audio system, OnStar, and speed cruise control buttons on the front of the wheel). The electrochromic inside rearview mirror (ISRV) now integrates the OnStar system controls in addition to the exterior (outside) temperature display and integrated directional compass. The front and second and third-row seat designs were updated, and the Zebrano interior trim was replaced with Burlwood. The Escalade ESV (extended-length model) also debuted for the 2003 model year. Finally, the warning chimes now played through the front driver's door speaker, as opposed to a separately mounted chime module on 2002 models.

=== Engines ===
- 2002–2003 5.3L LM7 Vortec V8, 285 hp (213 kW) (VIN code T)
- 2004–2005 5.3L LM7 Vortec V8, 295 hp (220 kW) (VIN code T)
- 2002–2006 6.0L LQ9 HO Vortec V8, 345 hp (257 kW) (VIN code N)
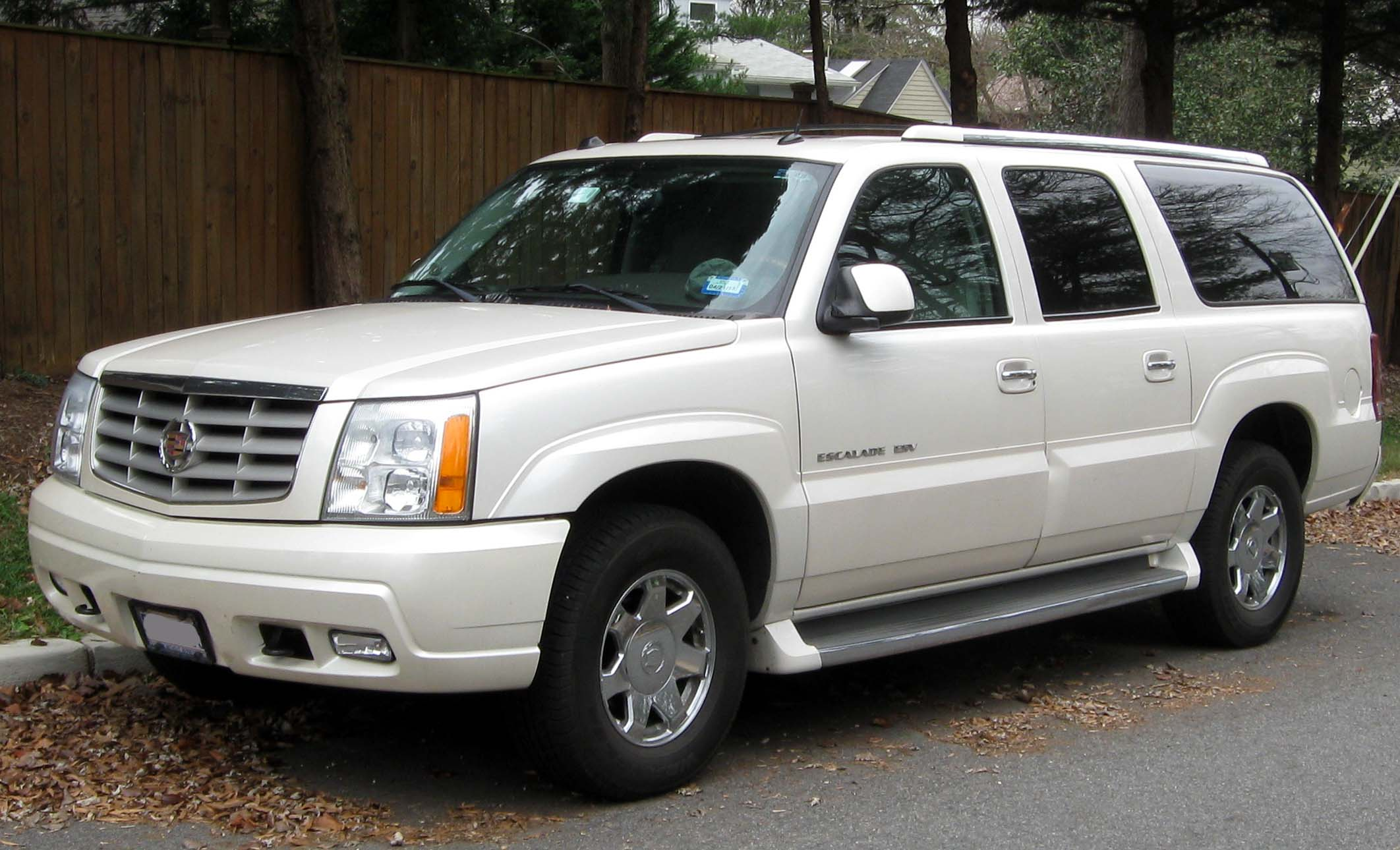
GMT800 Cadillac Escalade ESV

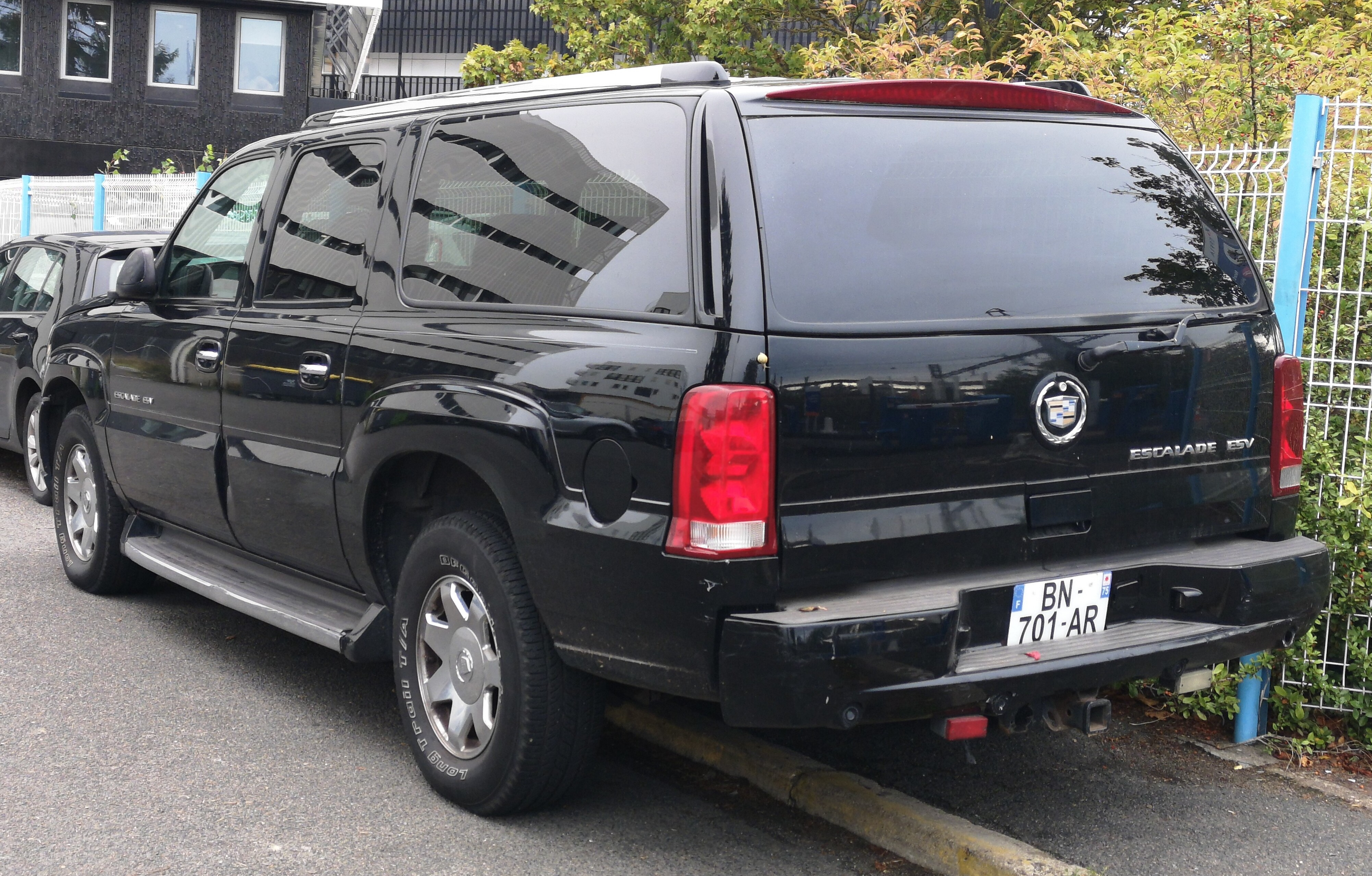
GMT800 Cadillac Escalade ESV rear

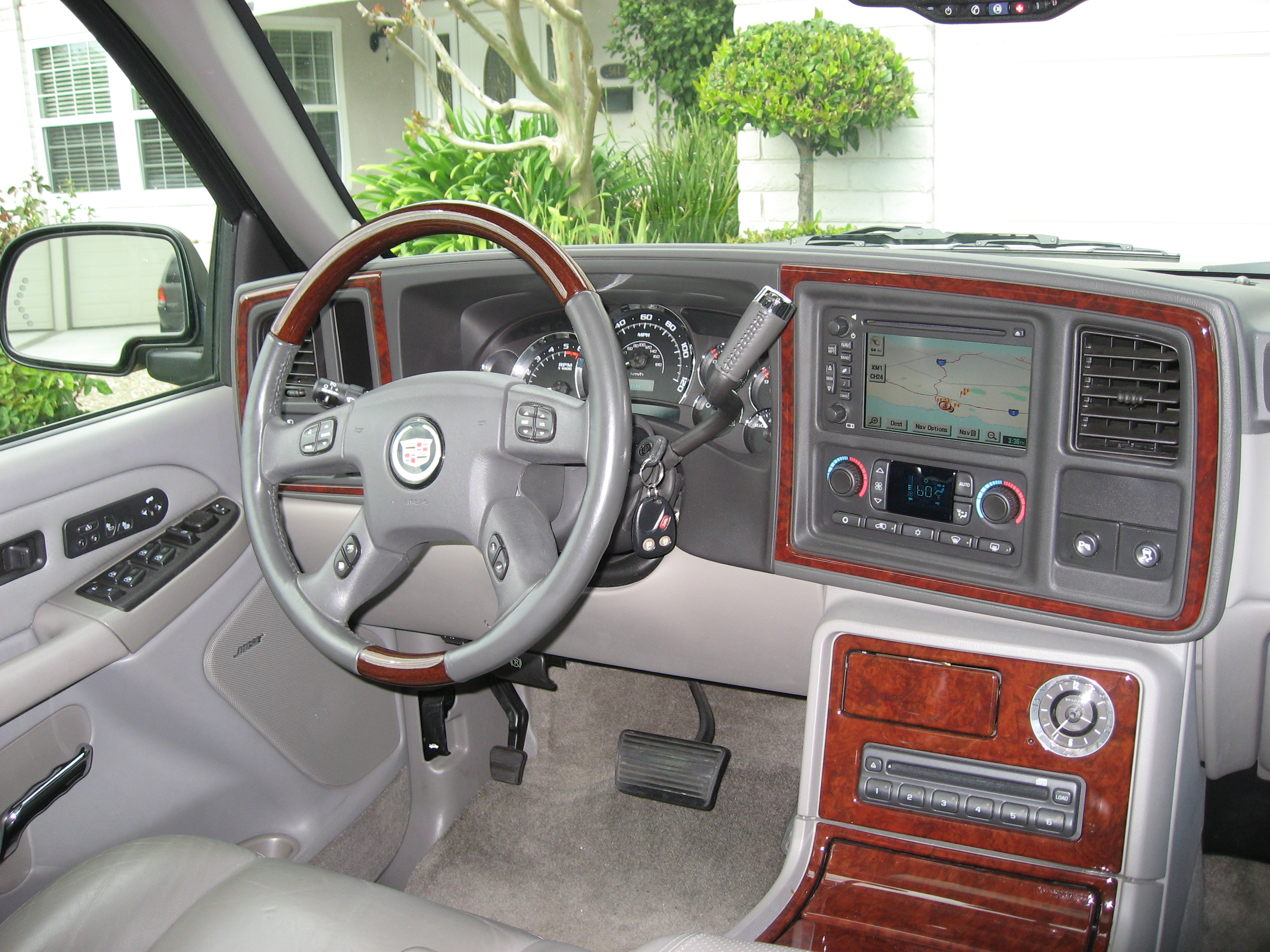
Interior of a 2001–2006 Cadillac Escalade

== Third generation (2007) ==
GMT900
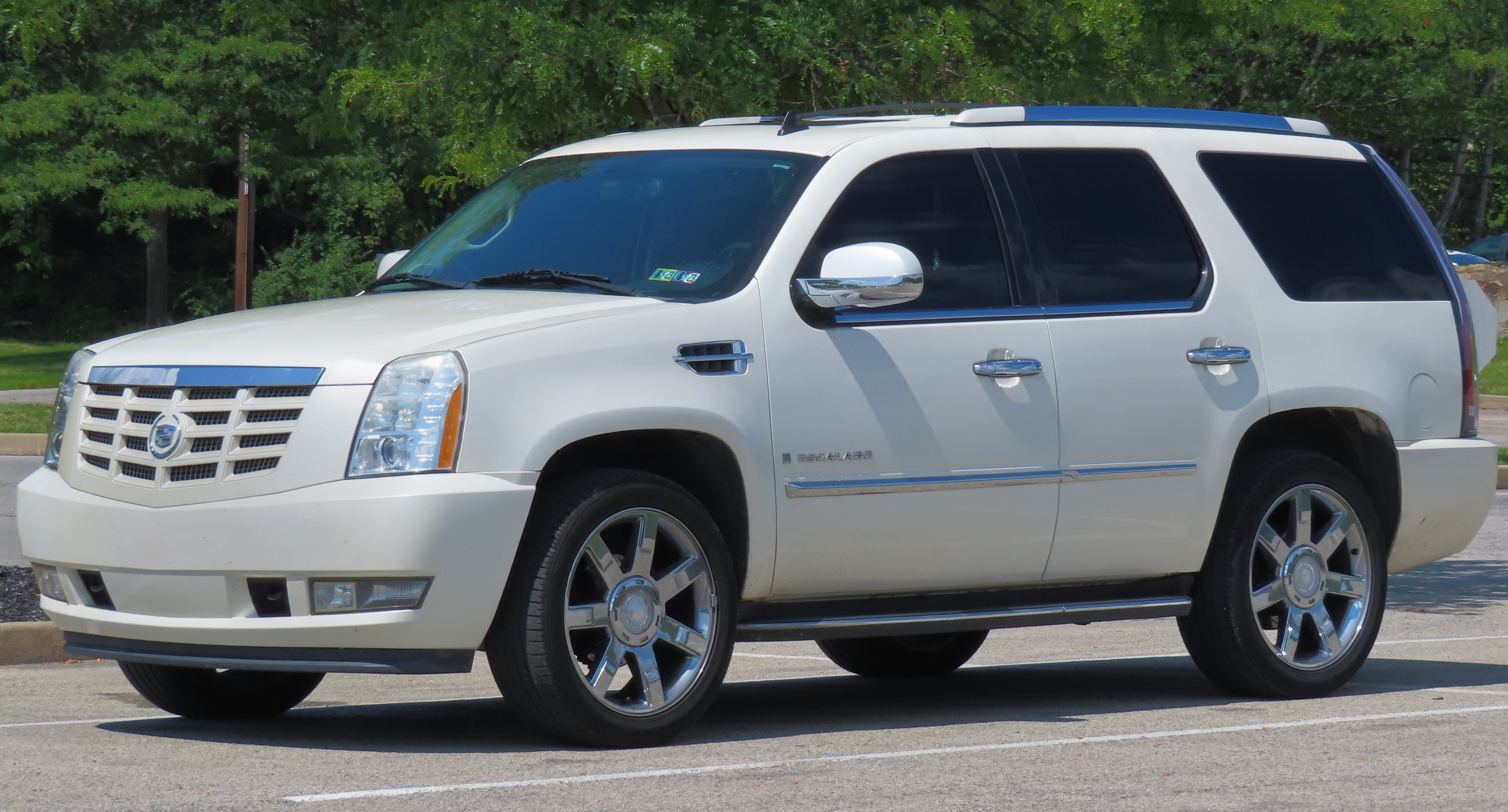

Overview
- Production: January 2006–2014; 2008–2013 (Hybrid)
- Model years: 2007–2014; 2009–2013 (Hybrid)
- Assembly: United States: Arlington, Texas (Arlington Assembly); Mexico: Silao, Guanajuato (Silao Assembly; EXT only); Russia: Kaliningrad (Avtotor)
- Designer: Wayne Cherry

Body and chassis
- Body style: 5-door SUV; 4-door sport utility truck
- Layout: FR (Front-engine, rear-wheel drive); F4 (Front-engine, four-wheel drive)
- Platform: GMT926; GMT936 (Escalade ESV)
- Related: Chevrolet Avalanche; Chevrolet Suburban; Chevrolet Tahoe; GMC Yukon/Yukon XL; Chevrolet Silverado/GMC Sierra

Powertrain
- Engine: Gasoline: 6.2 L L92 V8; Gasoline/E85: 6.2 L L9H V8; 6.2 L L94 V8; Gasoline hybrid: 6.0 L LFA V8; 6.0 L LZ1 V8
- Electric motor: 2×60 kW (80 hp; 82 PS) permanent magnet AC
- Transmission: 6-speed 6L80 automatic; 2ML70 CVT (Hybrid)
- Hybrid drivetrain: FHEV (Escalade Hybrid)
- Battery: Ni–MH (Hybrid)

Dimensions
- Wheelbase: 116.0 in (2,946 mm); 130.0 in (3,302 mm) (ESV)
- Length: 202.5 in (5,144 mm); 222.9 in (5,662 mm) (ESV)
- Width: 79.0 in (2,007 mm)
- Height: 74.7 in (1,897 mm) (2007–09 2WD); 74.5 in (1,892 mm) (2007–09 ESV); 74.3 in (1,887 mm) (2007–09 4WD); 75.9 in (1,928 mm) (2010–13 SWB); 73.1 in (1,857 mm) (2010–2013 ESV)

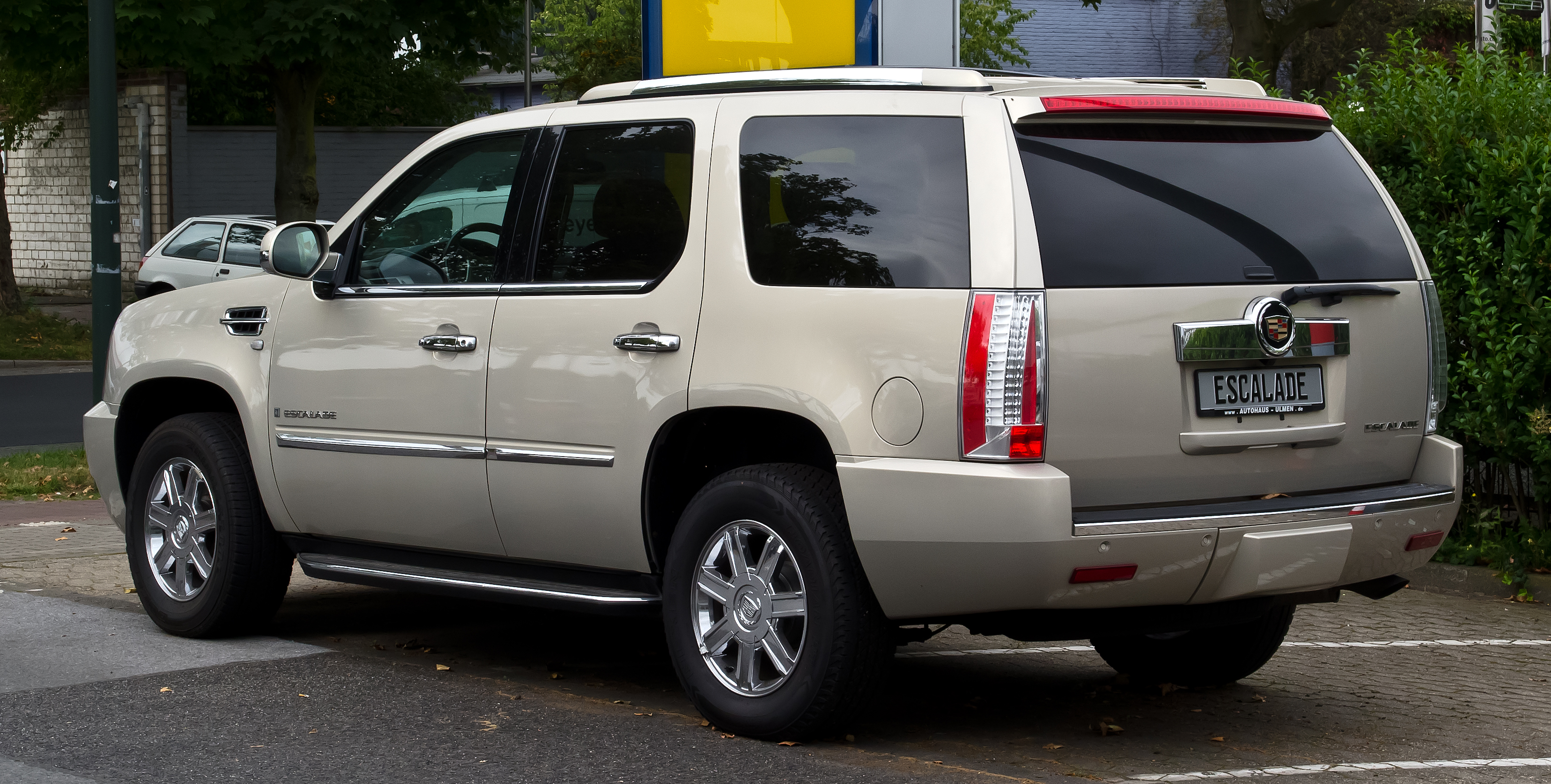
European spec GMT900 Cadillac Escalade (regular length)

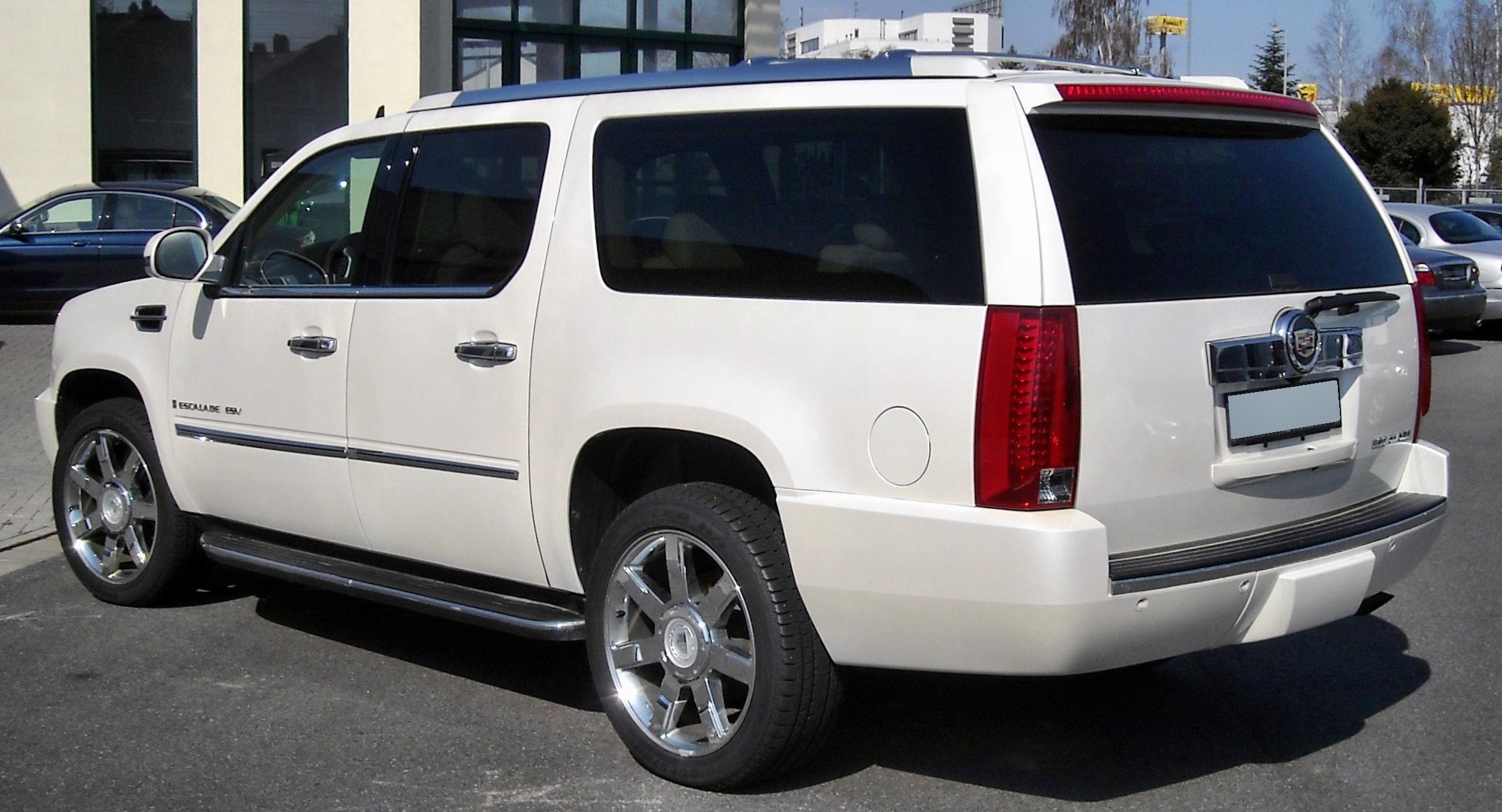
GMT900 Cadillac Escalade ESV

The Escalade moved to the new GMT900 platform for the 2007 model year, along with all of its companion models (Silverado, Sierra, Suburban, Tahoe, Avalanche, Yukon, Yukon XL, and Yukon Denali), which were launched simultaneously. The regular Escalade was again joined by the stretched ESV version and EXT sport utility truck. The 2007 Escalade was the official vehicle of Super Bowl XL, with MVP Hines Ward being awarded one of the first Escalades produced. The design also includes vertical headlights again, now more closely influenced by GM's own GMC Yukon from the same year and/of generation.

Production of the redesigned Escalade began at Arlington Assembly in January 2006. It was priced from US$57,280, though the rear-wheel-drive version at this price was not produced until August. The more expensive all-wheel-drive version was produced first, followed by the long-wheelbase ESV and EXT pickup (the latter sourced from the plant in Silao, Mexico) in June.

The Escalade uses an all-aluminum 6.2L Vortec V8, the industry's first mass-produced pushrod engine with variable valve timing. The system adjusts both intake and exhaust timing between two settings. The engine produces 403 hp (301 kW) (23 hp more than its sister competitor, the GMC Yukon Denali) and 417 lb⋅ft (565 N⋅m) of torque. A new six-speed 6L80 automatic transmission is used. The new body completes a 0.363 drag coefficient. In 2010, the Escalade's base price was $62,500 for an RWD model, and $65,200 for an AWD model. The Northeast accounts for 60 percent of Escalade sales. The 2013 short-wheelbase 2WD model has an EPA-estimated fuel economy rating of 14 mpg_{‑US} (17 L/100 km), combined 16 mpg_{‑US} (15 L/100 km), and highway 18 mpg_{‑US} (13 L/100 km).

=== Engines ===
2007–2014: 6.2L Vortec 6200 V8, 403 hp (301 kW)

=== Hybrid ===
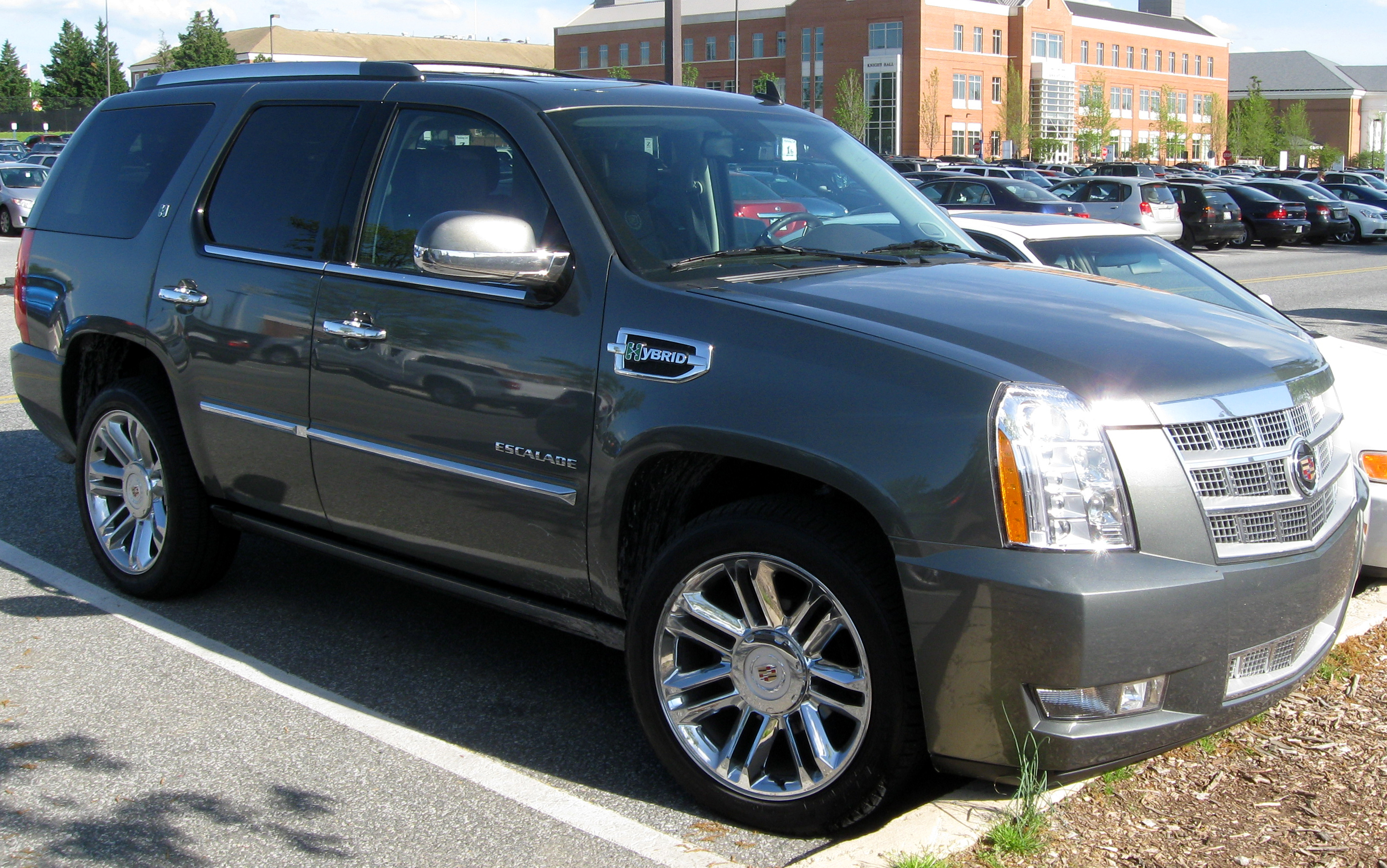
Cadillac Escalade Hybrid

A two-mode hybrid version debuted at the 2008 South Florida International Auto Show in Miami, and went on sale in 2008 as a 2009 model at a starting price of $74,085 for a two-wheel-drive model. In August 2008, 20% of Escalade sales were hybrids.

The Escalade Hybrid takes 8.2 seconds to accelerate from 0 to 60 mph (97 km/h). The Hybrid is powered by a 6.0-liter V8. It is joined by two 60-kilowatt electric motors supplied by a nickel–metal hydride battery pack under the rear seat. On its own, the V8 is rated at 332 hp (248 kW) at 5,100 rpm and 367 lb⋅ft (498 N⋅m) at 4,100 rpm. GM engineers claim that combined output with the electric motors is 379 hp (283 kW). The unique transmission houses the electric motors along with three different planetary gear sets and four traditional clutches.

=== Standard features ===
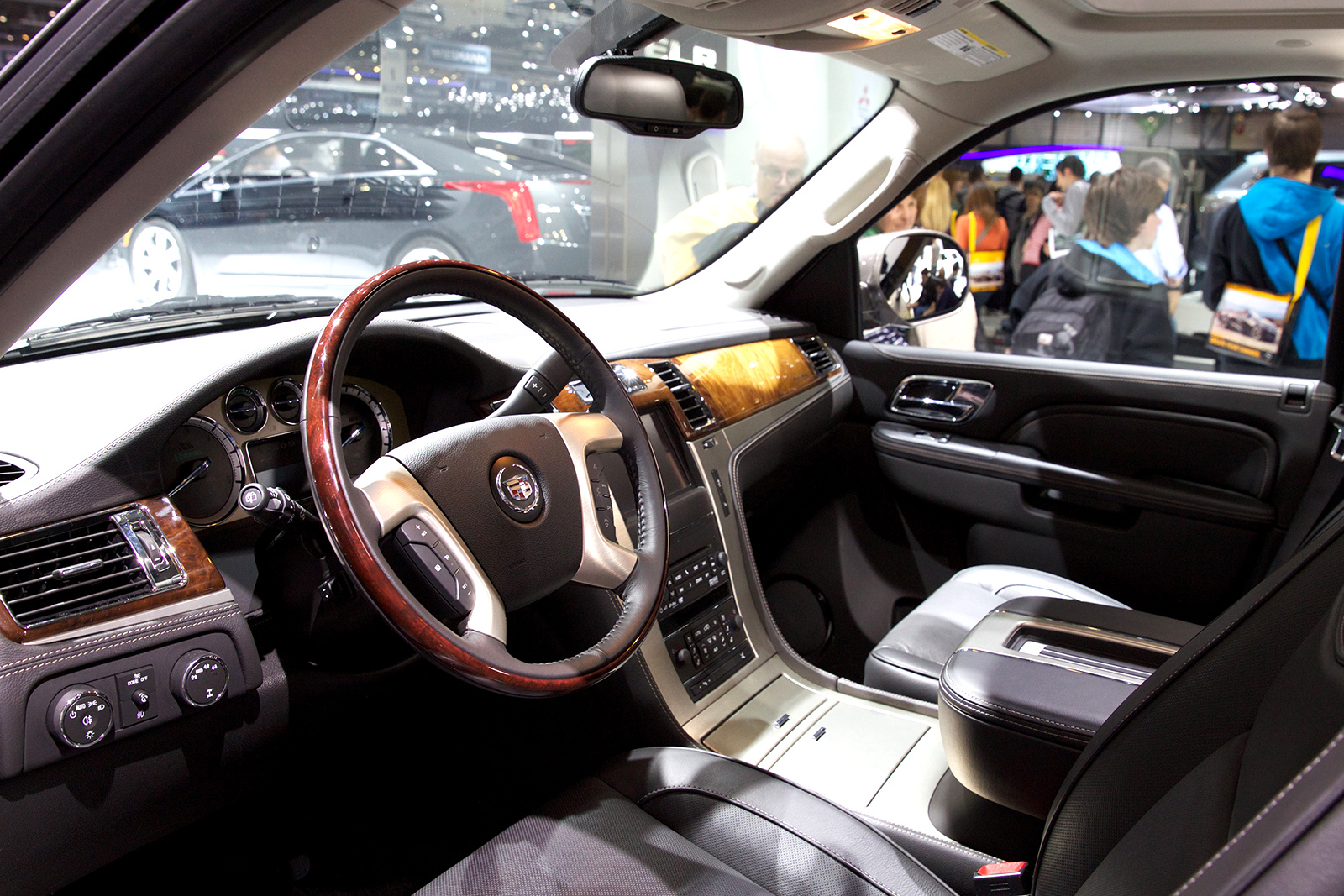
Interior of a 2007–2014 Cadillac Escalade

Standard features of the Escalade include air conditioning with tri-zone climate control, Nuance leather-trimmed seats, a wood and leather-wrapped steering wheel with audio controls, cruise control, heated front seats and heated second-row seats, 14-way power front seats, a memory system, remote engine start, a premium sound system, a six-disc CD changer, rear radio controls, a compass, a power liftgate, and an outside-temperature indicator. The Platinum adds a DVD entertainment system, navigation system, heated and cooled cup holders, rearview camera, cooled front seats, upgraded leather (Tehama front and second-row upholstery), and power-retractable running boards.

=== Safety ===
According to the Insurance Institute for Highway Safety, 2007–08 Escalade models had the highest fatality rate of their class, with a driver death rate of 33 compared to the class average of 15.

NHTSA 2014 Escalade:
Overall:	4/5 stars
Frontal Driver:	5/5 stars
Frontal Passenger:	4/5 stars
Side Driver:	5/5 stars
Side Passenger:	5/5 stars
Side Pole Driver:	5/5 stars
Rollover RWD:	/ 24.6%
Rollover AWD:	/ 22.8%

=== Updates ===
2008

- On the automatic trunk button, the "off" signal was changed from the number "0" (zero) to the word "off".
- Seating capacity was increased to eight passengers.
- A newly-redesigned remote for keyless entry was introduced to further distinguish it from the Chevrolet Tahoe/GMC Yukon Denali siblings.
- One-touch closing function added for the front windows.

2009

- Bluetooth (phone only) was made standard.
- A power-tilt steering wheel was made standard.
- Driver and passenger headrests were updated and are no longer able to be tilted.
- The optional satellite navigation system now added instant traffic updates and rerouting options.

2010

- Partway through the model year, the "GM" badging was removed from the front doors.
- AFM (Active Fuel Management) was added.
- USB port was added to the center console.
- Revised front airbag and door.
- Shifter interlock and a steering wheel lock were added.
- Front window switches changed in shape.
- Rain-sensing windshield wipers are no longer available.

2011

- Second-row headrests made larger and no longer adjustable.

2012

- The Escalade Premium had been refreshed and updated to look more like the Escalade Platinum, but the Escalade Premium did have clear see-through taillights.

2013

- Silver Coast Metallic and Sapphire Blue Metallic were added as new color options, along with a revised grade braking performance.
- LED running lights were added to Escalade and Escalade ESV models.

2014

- A new color, Midnight Plum Metallic, was added. For the first time, the Escalade would only be available in both standard and ESV versions, since the EXT and Hybrid models were discontinued. This would be the last year for this generation Escalade. Additionally, this was the longest generation of the Escalade.

== Fourth generation (2015) ==
GMT K2UL
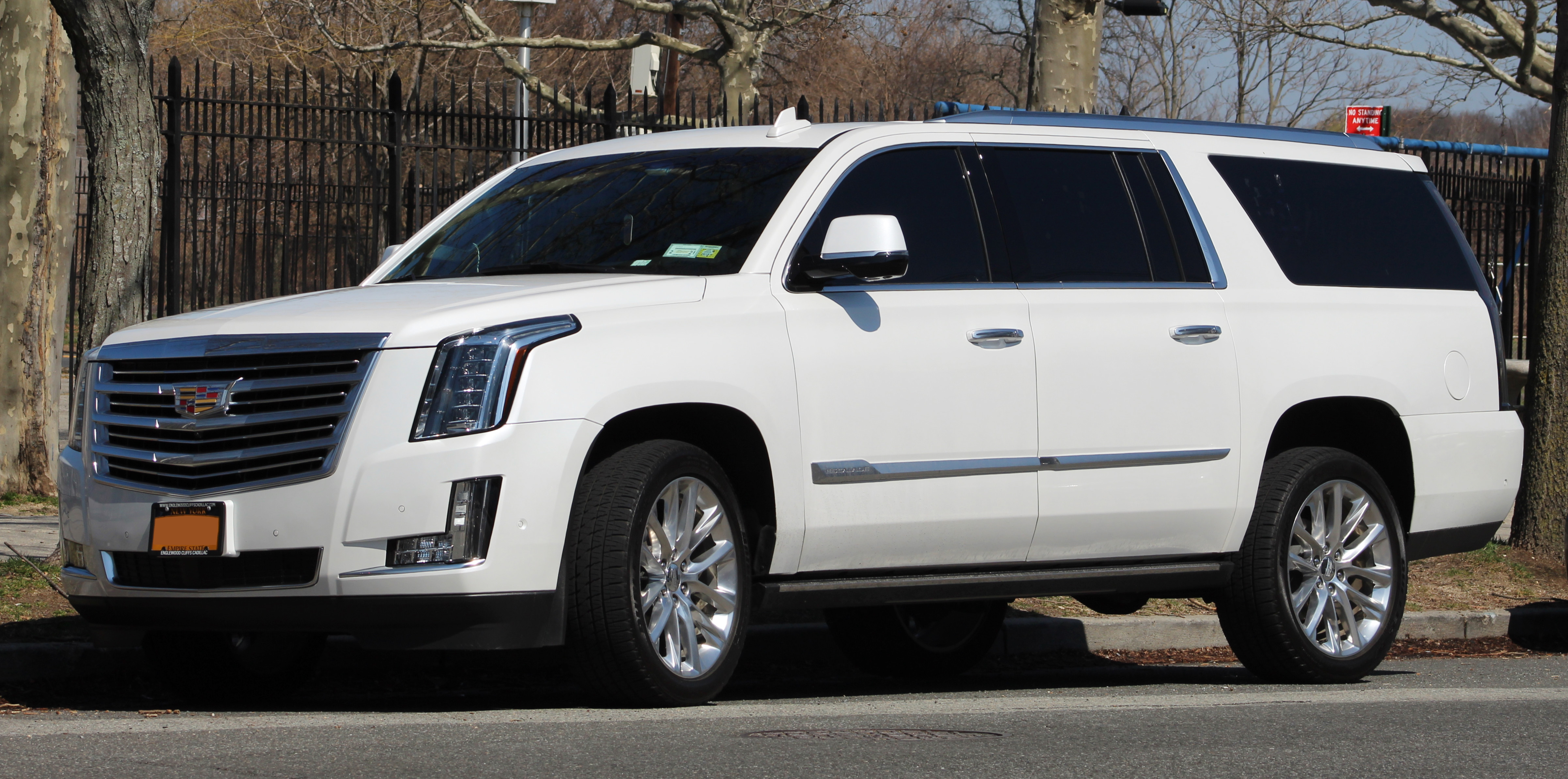

Overview
- Production: January 2014 – December 2019
- Model years: 2015–2020
- Assembly: United States: Arlington, Texas (Arlington Assembly); Belarus: Minsk (Unison)
- Designer: Bob Boniface (exterior design director)

Body and chassis
- Body style: 4-door SUV
- Layout: Front engine, rear-wheel drive; Front-engine, all-wheel drive
- Platform: GMT K2XX
- Related: Chevrolet Surburban; Chevrolet Tahoe; GMC Yukon; GMC Yukon XL

Powertrain
- Engine: 6.2L EcoTec3 L86 V8
- Transmission: 6-speed GM 6L80 automatic (2015); 8-speed GM 8L90 automatic (2015–17); 10-speed Hydra-Matic 10L80 automatic (2018–20)

Dimensions
- Wheelbase: 116.0 in (2,946 mm); 130.0 in (3,302 mm) (ESV)
- Length: 202.5 in (5,144 mm); 224.3 in (5,697 mm) (ESV)
- Width: 80.5 in (2,045 mm)
- Height: SWB: 74.4 in (1,890 mm); ESV: 74.0 in (1,880 mm)

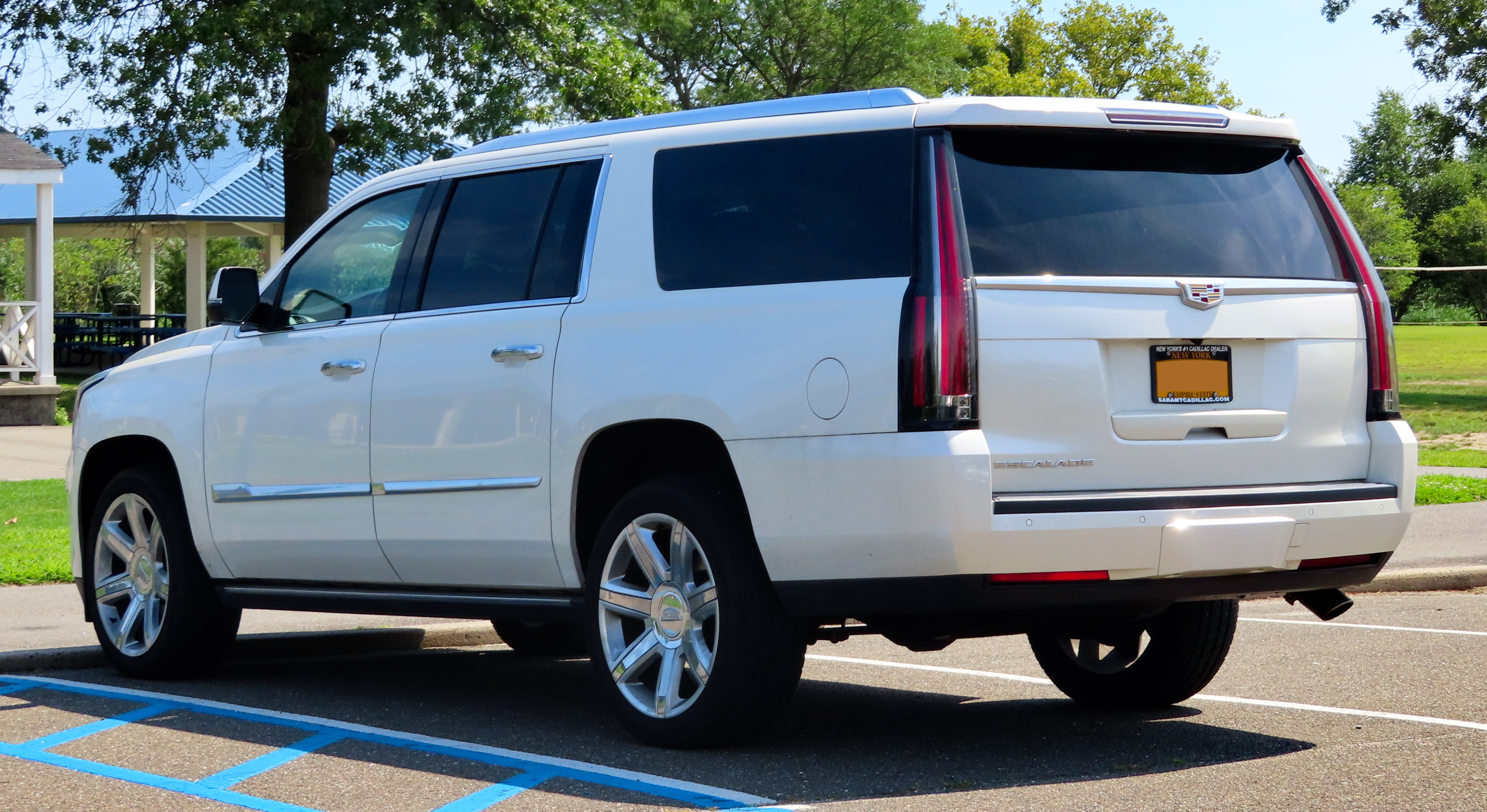
2015 Cadillac Escalade ESV

On October 7, 2013, Cadillac unveiled the fourth-generation Escalade and Escalade ESV at an event in New York City, just nearly a month after GM unveiled their next-generation SUVs from Chevrolet and GMC. Cadillac began its campaign to promote the Escalade on August 14, 2013, and started posting teasers online on September 23, 2013, with help from the photographer Autumn de Wilde, who helped reveal more images ahead of the unveiling. A YouTube page called "Escalade Reveal" was set up to showcase the videos along with the countdown to the unveiling. On November 25, 2013, Cadillac began spreading the word of mouth about the 2015 Escalade by placing a front facsimile cutout of the vehicle on display at Saks Fifth Avenue's New York City flagship store during its annual Christmas promotional campaign, which shows the SUV being frozen in wraps.

Production on the 2015 Escalade began in January 2014 at GM's Arlington Assembly plant, and went on sale in April 2014 as a 2015 model (with the MSRP starting at around $71,000 for standard length and $74,000 for ESV), and available in only three trims: Base, Luxury, and Premium. International sales were scheduled to start in the summer of 2014. They are assigned to the GMT K2XX platform as K2XL. "The 2015 Escalade exterior light signature draws inspiration from various sources, beginning with Cadillac's heritage of vertical exterior lamps and extending into architecture," said Exterior Lighting Design Manager Martin Davis.

The Escalade was planned to switch to the unibody Lambda platform, but was quickly nixed because of customer aversion. According to a report on Autoblog.com, GM had reissued a redesign on its full-size SUV lineup, including the Escalade, for a 2014 release in response to increased SUV sales, and was working on its full-size SUV replacements, which would see a possible change in the Escalade's SUV platform. However, in July 2013, a series of spy shots revealed that GM would keep the Escalade a body-on-frame SUV. However, GM began looking into expanding the Escalade brand to the large CUV segment, which would see a vehicle using the Escalade badge sharing the same platform as the Chevrolet Traverse and GMC Acadia, which is in the planning stages. According to VP Bob Ferguson, Cadillac's first three-row Escalade CUV could be introduced in 2016. There was also a possibility that GM might export the Escalade to Australia as a right-hand drive vehicle as part of Cadillac's global expansion; GM had begun to import its North American vehicles to its Holden division there after discontinuing the latter's locally produced models in 2017.

The cargo space was reduced from 109.8 in (2,789 mm) to 94.2 in (2,393 mm) on the standard model and from 137.5 in (3,492 mm) to 120.5 in (3,061 mm) on the ESV in order to allow an additional 1.7 inches of headroom and 45.3 inches of legroom in the front while reducing the third-row legroom space from 25.6 in (650 mm) to 24.8 in (630 mm). GM's 6.2-liter EcoTec3 V8, producing 420 horsepower and 460 pound-feet of torque, mated to a six-speed automatic transmission (2015 models and beyond are eight-speed automatics), is the only engine offered, along with a new coil-over front suspension and five-link rear setup, a wider track, variable-assist electric power steering, and Cadillac's Magnetic Ride Control system with Tour and Sport modes. The interior now has a hand-crafted design that features cut-and-sewn and wrapped materials, with wood trim options. The dashboard was also updated, and the Cadillac CUE system is added as a standard feature, along with an updated security system.

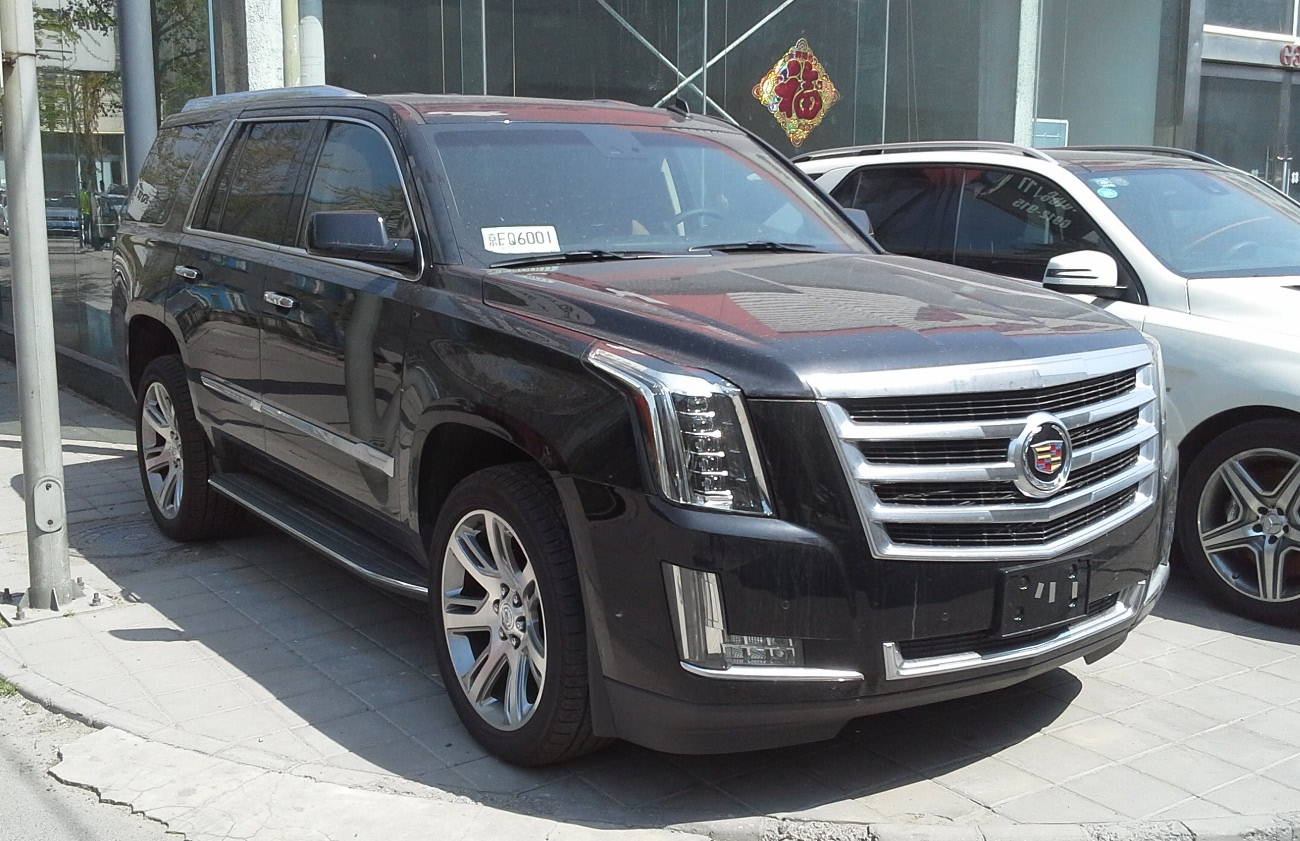
Fourth-generation Escalade with the older crest

The 2015 Escalade lineup received an eight-speed transmission, surround view camera, and 4G LTE connectivity as part of a mid-year refresh, which also saw the wreaths on the grille disappear from the Escalade as part of Cadillac's plans to update its logo to emphasize the crest on all of its models.

=== Updates ===
==== 2016 ====
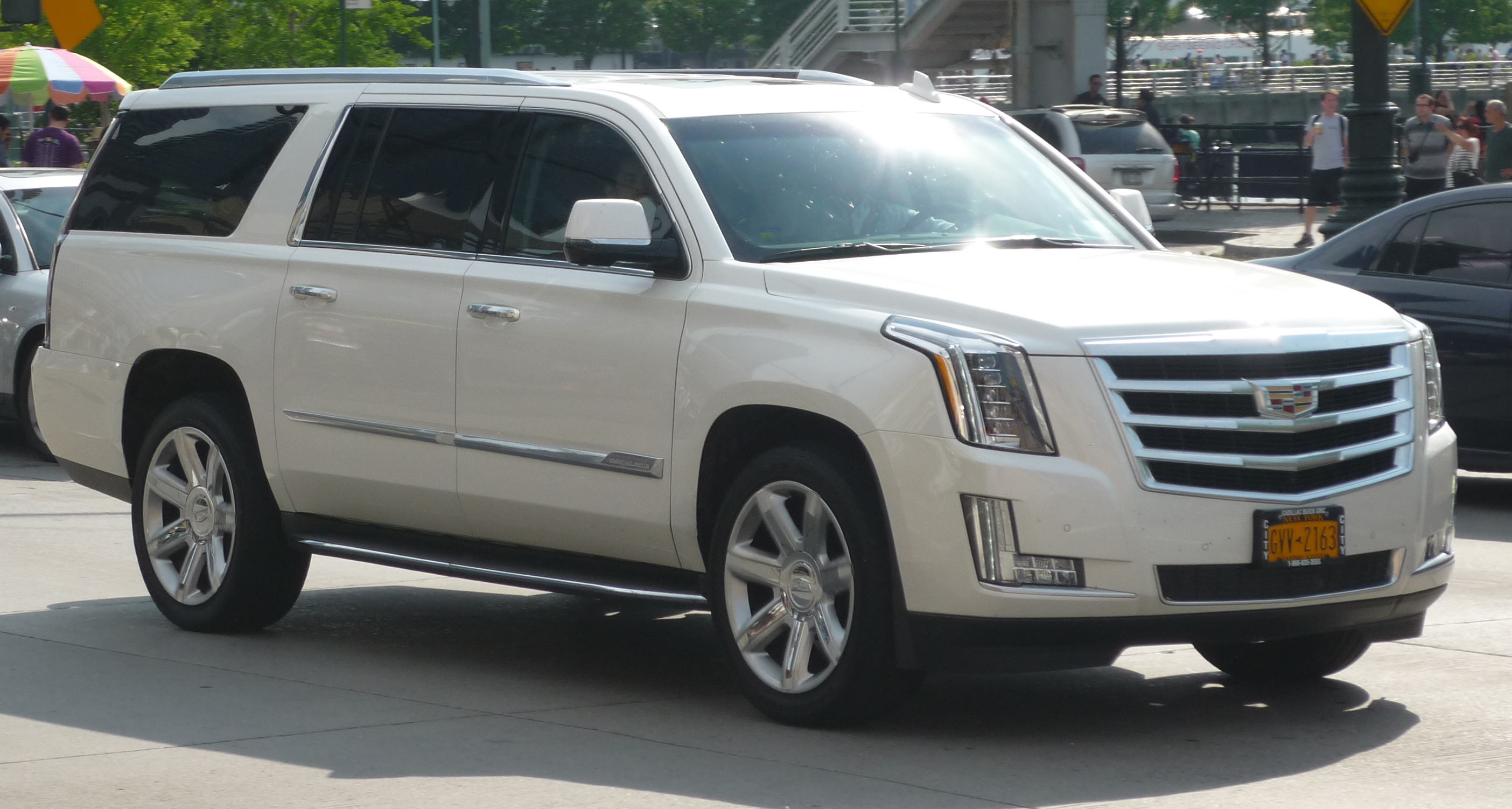
2016 Escalade ESV sporting the new Cadillac crest

For the 2016 model year, Cadillac made upgraded changes to the Escalade and Escalade ESV:

- Four new colors are featured: Gray Silk Metallic, Red Passion Tintcoat, Crystal White Tricoat, and Dark Emerald Metallic; both Crystal Red Tintcoat and White Diamond Tricoat were discontinued.
- Advanced Diagnostics added to the Cadillac Cue System, which also received upgraded improvements; the SD card slot was removed.
- An upgraded Driver Awareness Package that is available on all trims.
- IntelliBeam headlamps (all trims).
- Lane Keep Assist.
- Rear-seat DVD entertainment system, dual independent, LPO.
- Third-row comfort guides become a service part.
- A 12.3" reconfigurable cluster change to the Normal Blue display.
- Cadillac crest loses the wreath design from the logo in the middle of the 2016 model year. Earlier-produced 2016 Escalade vehicles featured the wreath design.
- Platinum trim level reintroduced, which is fully loaded with all the Escalade's optional features standard on this trim level plus DVD headrests as part of the rear-seat entertainment system in addition to the overhead DVD player, unlike on other trim levels.

==== 2017 ====
For the 2017 model year, minor changes were made to the Escalade and Escalade ESV:

- The PRNDM indicator is modified to PRNDL.
- The 4WD control knob is modified with new lighting indicators.
- Two new colors, Dark Adriatic Blue Metallic and Bronze Dune Metallic, are added, with two others (Dark Emerald and Majestic Plum) discontinued.
- An updated Cadillac Cue system combining both Collection and Teen Driver features.
- Addition of the Live-View rear-vision camera to the rearview mirror.
- The trims' base levels were restructured to Standard, Luxury, Premium Luxury and Platinum.
- New Radiant Package added.
- Rear seat reminder added.
- Rear-seat entertainment switched from RCA to HDMI input.

==== 2018 ====
Changes were made to the 2018 Escalade and Escalade ESV:

- Satin Steel Metallic is added as a new color, replacing both Silver Coast Metallic and Amethyst Metallic.
- Shale/Jet Black (all trims) and Maple Sugar/Jet Black (Platinum only) are the new combined interior options, replacing Shale/Cocoa and Tuscan Brown.
- The entire console center is modified, along with the cup holders and a new seat memory system.
- A new 10-speed transmission is added, replacing the eight-speed transmission.

==== 2019 ====
Minor changes that were made for the 2019 Escalade/ESV are:

- Manhattan Noir Metallic and Shadow Metallic colors are introduced, replacing Midnight Sky Metallic and Dark Granite Metallic.
- Logo Light added to hands free liftgate.
- New Sport Package added as an available option on Luxury, Premium Luxury, and Platinum trim levels.

==== 2020 ====
The 2020 Escalade would be the final model year for the fourth-generation version, as it would be sold during its shortened period. The only changes made were the deletion of the Manhattan Noir Metallic and Bronze Dune Metallic colors and the addition of the Dark Mocha Metallic color. The dealer-ordered Escalade Noir package was also eliminated after being offered for only a year.

GM had proposed a facelift for the 2020 model that would have featured a grille resembling that of the Cadillac XT6, but the proposal was scrapped in favor of the next-generation model that would debut for the 2021 model year.

=== Hennessey HPE550 ===
In 2014, Hennessey Performance Engineering offered a HPE550 supercharger upgrade to fourth generation Escalade customers, which included a belt-driven supercharger, air-to-water intercooler, recalibrated engine management software and a three-year/36,000 mile powertrain warranty, a 6 psi (0.4 bar) boost that will increase the 6.2L engine's performance to 557 hp (415 kW; 565 PS) and 542 lb⋅ft (735 N⋅m) of torque, and 20-inch lightweight H10 forged Monoblock wheels. The upgrades, once they are ordered by customers, have a set price of $15,950.

=== International version ===
In July 2015, GM reached a deal with Unison SP ZAO in Minsk, Belarus, to build and assemble the Escalade and Escalade ESV for the Russian and CIS markets. This version was similar to the Chevrolet Tahoe, featuring the 6.2L V8 EcoTec3 engine and the Tahoe's semi-CKD assembled designs; the ESV also marked the first time an extended-length base model had been offered in this region. It was available in 4WD models only and carried an MSRP of 4.34 million rubles (US$76,984) for standard-size and 4.59 million rubles (US$81,383) for ESV.

=== Critical reception ===
The reviews for the fourth-generation Escalade's redesign have been met with positive reviews from critics. USA Today's James R. Healey and Fred Meier noted that "The once-unthinkable big Cadillac SUV has become indispensable." CNET's Antuan Goodwin notes that "Fans of the Escalade will appreciate the automaker's sticking with the original message and not "ruining" its former flagship, but if you already think the giant luxury SUV is a relic of the past, there's nothing in the 2015 Escalade that will convince you that it's anything but an old dog that's learned a few cool new tricks." Carscoops noted that "It may have impressed us more if a) it had shown the Escalade first instead of last, after the Chevrolet and GMC models or b) if the Chevrolet Tahoe and Suburban and GMC Yukon and Yukon XL simply did not exist…" and added that Cadillac has won their attention with the redesign. Scott Burgess of Motor Trend summed up the redesign in its headline, saying, "It's bigger, it's bolder and it's more beautiful." Bill Visnic of Edmunds concluded in his review that "With subtle, new sheet metal refreshingly free of styling gimmicks, Cadillac's looking to the 2015 Escalade's all-new and upgraded interior to help it retain its role as the benchmark of bling SUVs." The vehicle received a positive review by Autoblog contributor Michael Hartley, who took a road trip with a standard 4WD full-size trim from Los Angeles to Monterey, California. Although Hartley was skeptical at first, he came away impressed: "A 600-mile trip in the Escalade left me convinced that it has the features, build quality, and driving dynamics to strike new fear in the segment." Bloomberg News cited the Escalade as one of the best American-built SUVs ever made, adding that when comparing it to its foreign competitors, "It's the best we make."

GM hired Infiniti's Johan de Nysschen to serve as Cadillac president and help revitalize the brand. June 2014 shipments showed Cadillac down a few percent for the year; however, the Escalade was among the biggest winners, with a 74 percent sales jump, and was one of Cadillac's best-sellers the following July. As of March 2015, both standard and ESV Escalades had contributed to massive sales, with the full-size Escalade seeing a 117% increase and the ESV soaring to 114% overall.

On August 20, 2014, Automotive News and Autoblog began reporting that Cadillac dealers had been waiting three times longer than usual—a month or more—from the time an Escalade left the assembly line to when it was delivered, saying they did not always know where their vehicles were in transit, or when they were set to arrive, upsetting customers who have put down deposits, leading Cadillac dealerships to reportedly stop taking pre-orders. Even customers who placed orders as far as February 2014 were still waiting for the vehicles, according to the dealerships' owners. Cadillac blamed the delays on two weeks of "dwell time", citing "a lengthy quality-assurance process on some interior parts" that caused the lag, as well as additional issues with figuring out which vehicles should be delivered first. Despite the setback, Cadillac did plan to resolve the issues by adding more employees and speeding up production at the Arlington plant.

On March 16, 2016, Consumer Reports named the 2016 Escalade the worst large luxury SUV in its annual rankings, with an overall score of 44. Most of the criticism came from its room space, second-row seating, the CUE media system, stopping, stiff road handling, and its redesign, calling it the worst in class.

=== Recalls ===
In May 2014, GM recalled 1,402 units of the 2015 Escalade and Escalade ESV that were built between January and May 2014 due to "an insufficiently heated plastic weld that attaches the (front) passenger side airbag to the instrument panel assembly could result in a partial deployment of the air bag in the event of a crash." GM also placed a temporary halt on further sales, and informed owners of the affected vehicles to not let passengers sit in the front passenger seat until they were replaced.

== Fifth generation (2021) ==
GMT1UL
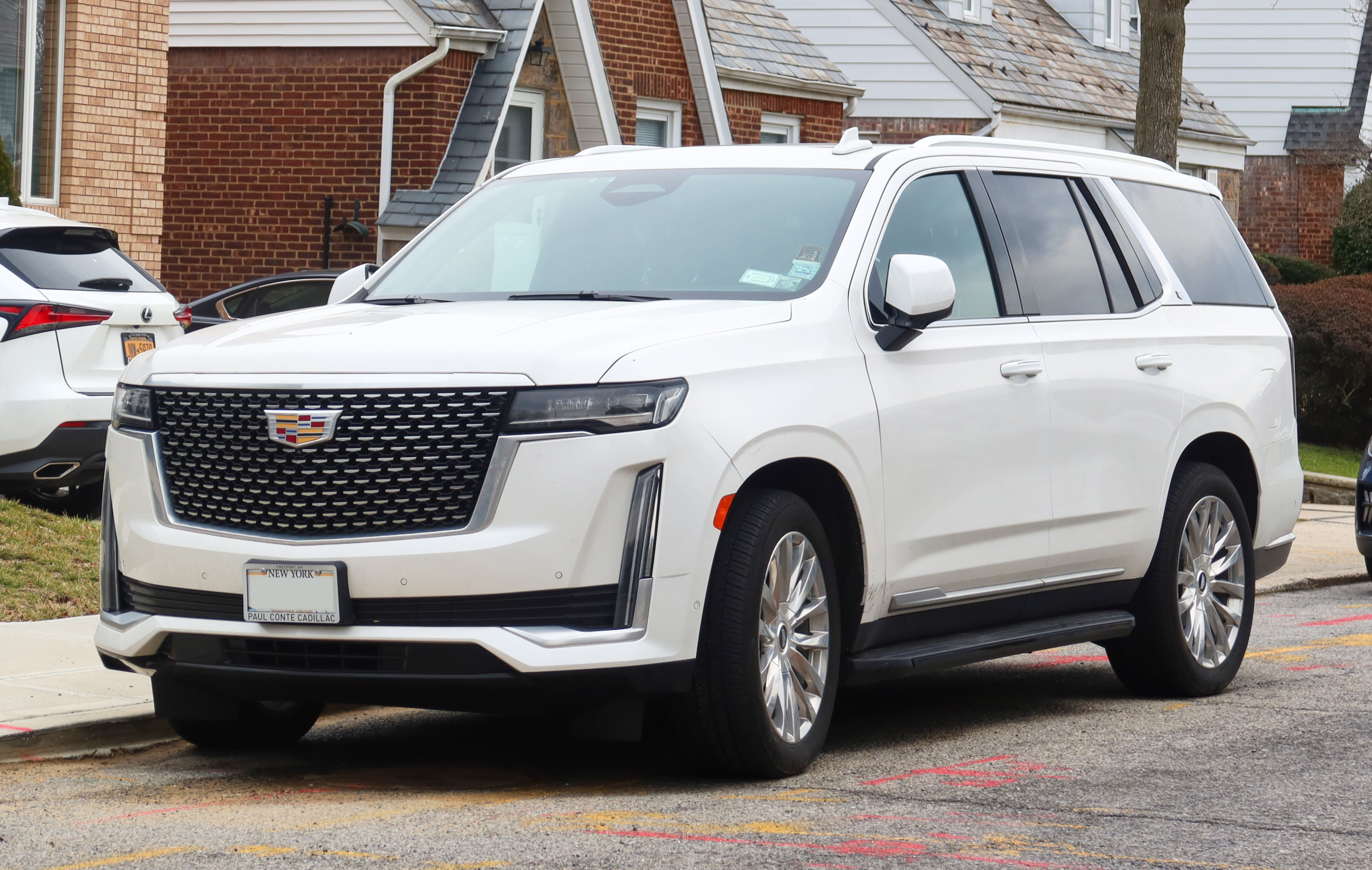
- 2021 Cadillac Escalade

Overview
- Production: September 2020 – present
- Model years: 2021–present
- Assembly: United States: Arlington, Texas (Arlington Assembly)
- Designer: Robin Krieg, Therese Pinazzo

Body and chassis
- Body style: 4-door SUV
- Layout: Front engine, rear-wheel drive; Front-engine, all-wheel drive
- Platform: GMT T1XX
- Related: Chevrolet Suburban; Chevrolet Tahoe; GMC Yukon/Yukon XL

Powertrain
- Engine: Gasoline: 6.2 L L87 EcoTec3 V8; 6.2 L LT4 supercharged V8 (Escalade-V); Diesel: 3.0 L LM2 Duramax I6 turbo
- Transmission: 10-speed Hydra-Matic 10L80 automatic

Dimensions
- Wheelbase: 120.9 in (3,071 mm); 134.1 in (3,406 mm) (ESV)
- Length: 211.9 in (5,382 mm); 227 in (5,766 mm) (ESV)
- Width: 81 in (2,057 mm); 81.1 in (2,060 mm) (ESV)
- Height: 76.6 in (1,946 mm); 76.4 in (1,941 mm) (ESV)
- Curb weight: 5,635–5,823 lb (2,556–2,641 kg); 5,785–5,993 lb (2,624–2,718 kg) (ESV)

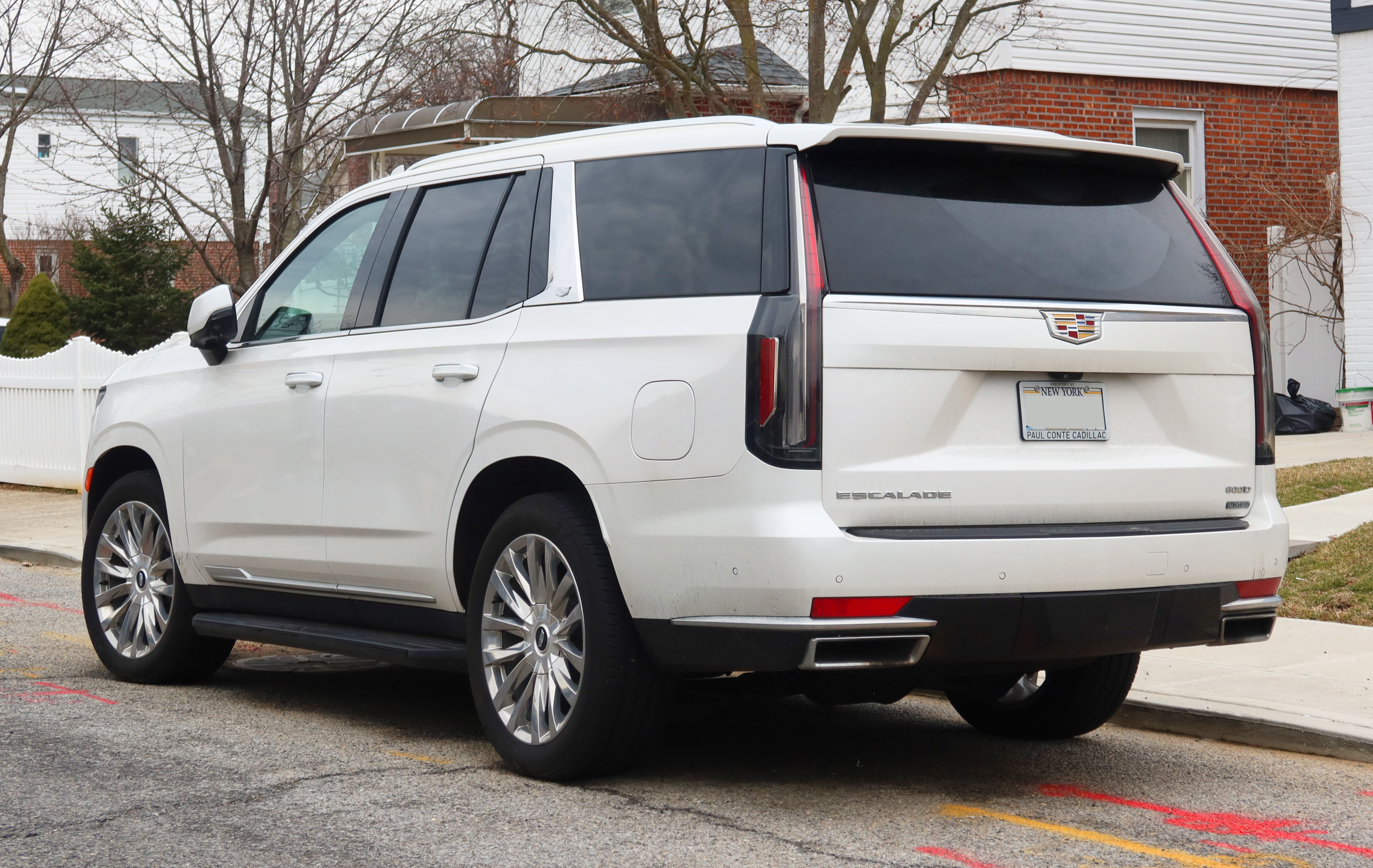
Rear view

The fifth-generation Escalade debuted on February 4, 2020, in Beverly Hills, California, for the 2021 model year, with sales commencing in the fall of 2020. Although production of the 2021 Escalade was pushed back due to the COVID-19 pandemic, GM had the vehicle scheduled to hit dealerships as planned. Dealers started taking pre-orders on April 23, 2020. To promote the Escalade, Cadillac launched a 3D visualizer showcasing the vehicle. This visualizer lets the user interact with the Escalade and Escalade ESV by turning on the lights, changing the color, changing the rims, and looking at the interior.

The fifth-generation Escalade is nearly two meters tall, and has a considerable blind spot (more than ten feet), one of the highest of popular cars.

The fifth-generation Escalade is built on the GMT1XX platform, sharing it with the Chevrolet Tahoe/GMC Yukon and Chevrolet Suburban/GMC Yukon XL, and has a front grille design similar to the one used on Cadillac's XT crossovers. This new platform gives the Escalade and its related models independent rear suspension, a first for the model. This change also allows the vehicle to increase its passenger and cargo space due to the more efficient design.

In December 2019, Cadillac unveiled a teaser video that featured a 38-inch curved OLED screen dashboard that displayed the Cadillac crest (on the driver's side) and "Escalade" name (across the passenger side), making this version unique in the Cadillac roster. This enabled Cadillac to boast of its "industry-first curved OLED screen technology" with "twice the pixel density of a 4K television". Augmented reality–enabled navigation was also introduced as a new feature available on the Escalade. On January 28, 2020, Cadillac introduced the "Super Cruise" feature, allowing for hands-free self-driving. This was followed on January 31 by the addition of the 3.0-liter LM2 inline six-cylinder Duramax turbodiesel engine as a no-charge option, badged as "600D" in line with the automaker's new naming convention. The Escalade is the first diesel-powered Cadillac offered in North America since the 1985 DeVille, Eldorado, Seville and Fleetwood, which were available with an Oldsmobile diesel V8. On the outside, it is longer than the previous Escalade and has more passenger room (particularly for the second- and third-row occupants) and cargo space.

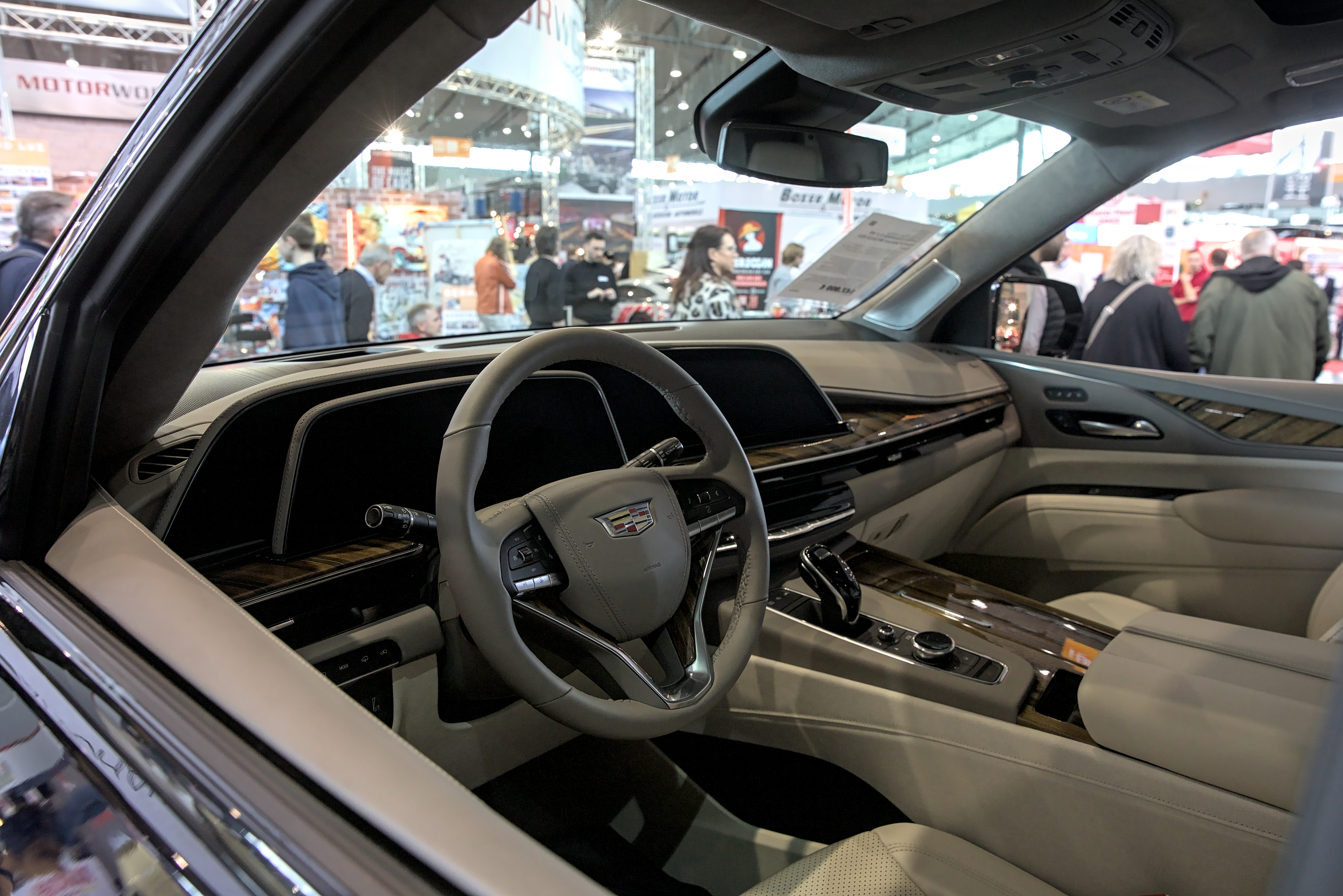
Interior

There are five trim levels available on the fifth generation Escalade: Luxury, Premium Luxury, Sport, Premium Luxury Platinum, and Sport Platinum. The interior choices consist of eight trim options and four seating designs. The AKG audio technology system is new, featuring 36 speakers throughout the cabin.

In November 2020, General Motors announced that the fifth-generation Escalade would be offered in Japan from 2021. It is available in standard length, two trim levels (Sport Platinum and Premium Luxury Platinum).

=== Critical reception ===
Car and Driver magazine praised the model for its high-tech self driving program and impressive display, in addition to the available diesel that tested at 27 mpg_{‑US} (8.7 L/100 km) on the highway. Motor Trend also had positive comments on the Escalade, especially the cabin. They described the optional 36-speaker AKG sound system as "among the best car audio systems on the market, period" for its lifelike sound. Despite the positive comments, it came in second place to the Lincoln Navigator in a four-way comparison test released shortly after the release of the 2021 model.

=== Escalade ESV ===
The 2021 Escalade ESV debuted online in April 2020, but its physical unveiling, including one scheduled for the New York International Auto Show, was cancelled due to the COVID-19 pandemic. It featured a unique fascia along with the passenger doors and wider exhaust pipes. In November 2020, GM announced that their large SUV lineup would be imported to China. The Escalade ESV was to mark its maiden entry into the country, starting with the fifth-generation models, but GM put those plans on hold in February 2021, citing the difficulty of having an import sold alongside its Chinese-built offerings, the makeup of the facilities that would be required to assemble the large full-size SUVs, and concerns that the full-size SUVs would not be able to comply with China's emission standards, as well as concerns that China's internal combustion engine excise taxes imposed on all vehicles sold in China that are powered by ICE engines more than 3.0 liters will hurt sales of GM's large full-size SUVs in the East Asian country.

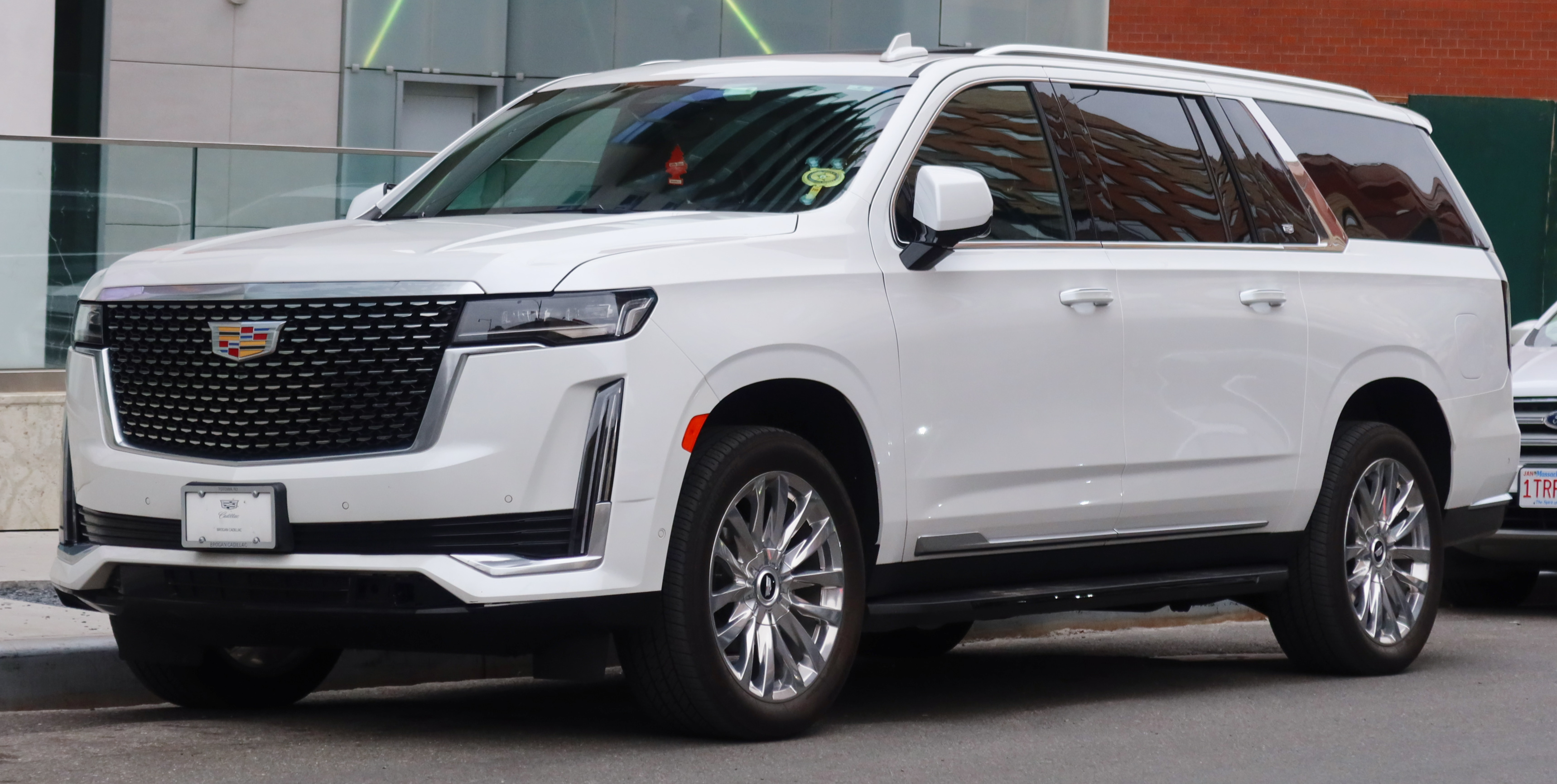
2021 Escalade ESV Premium front

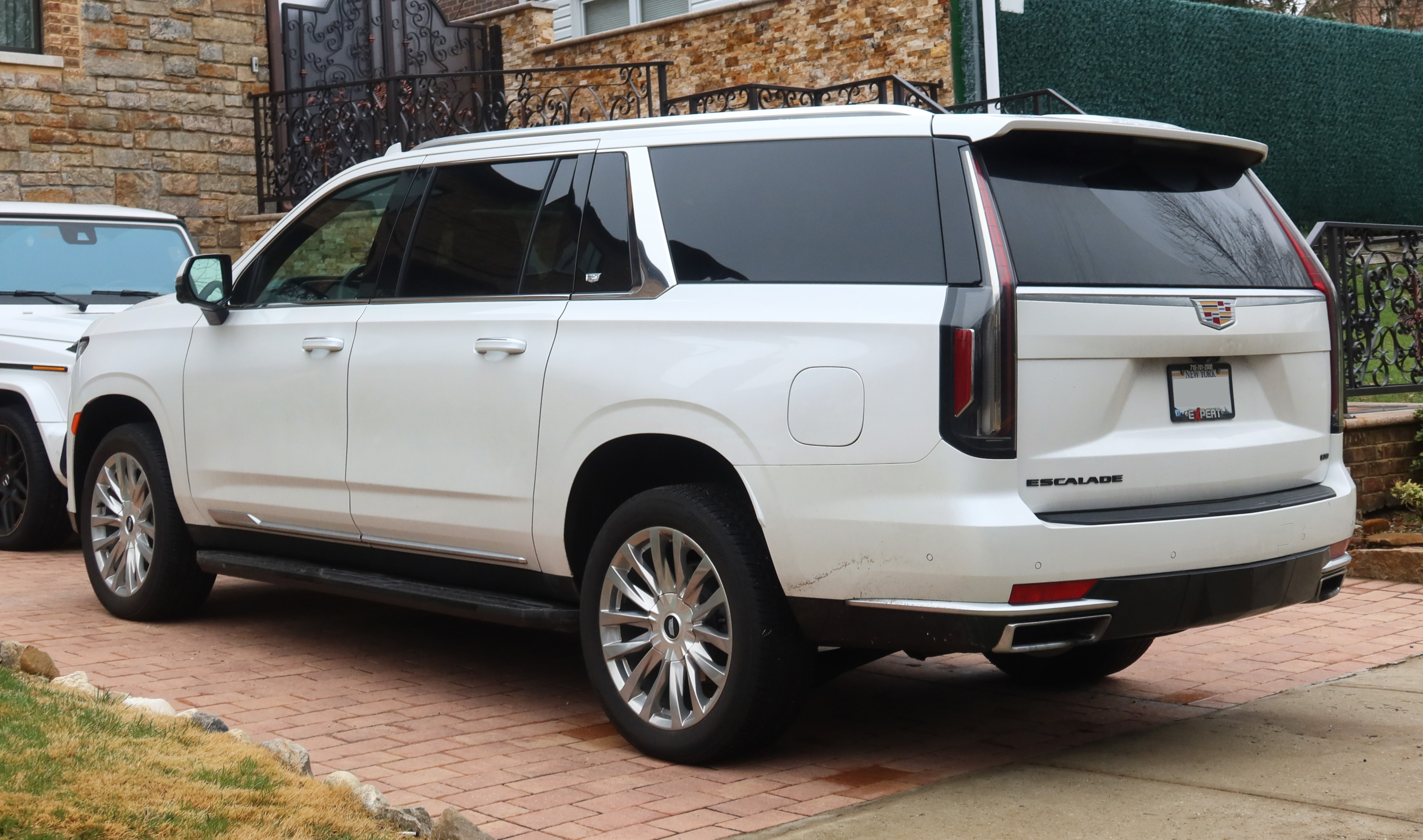
Escalade ESV Premium rear

=== Escalade-V ===
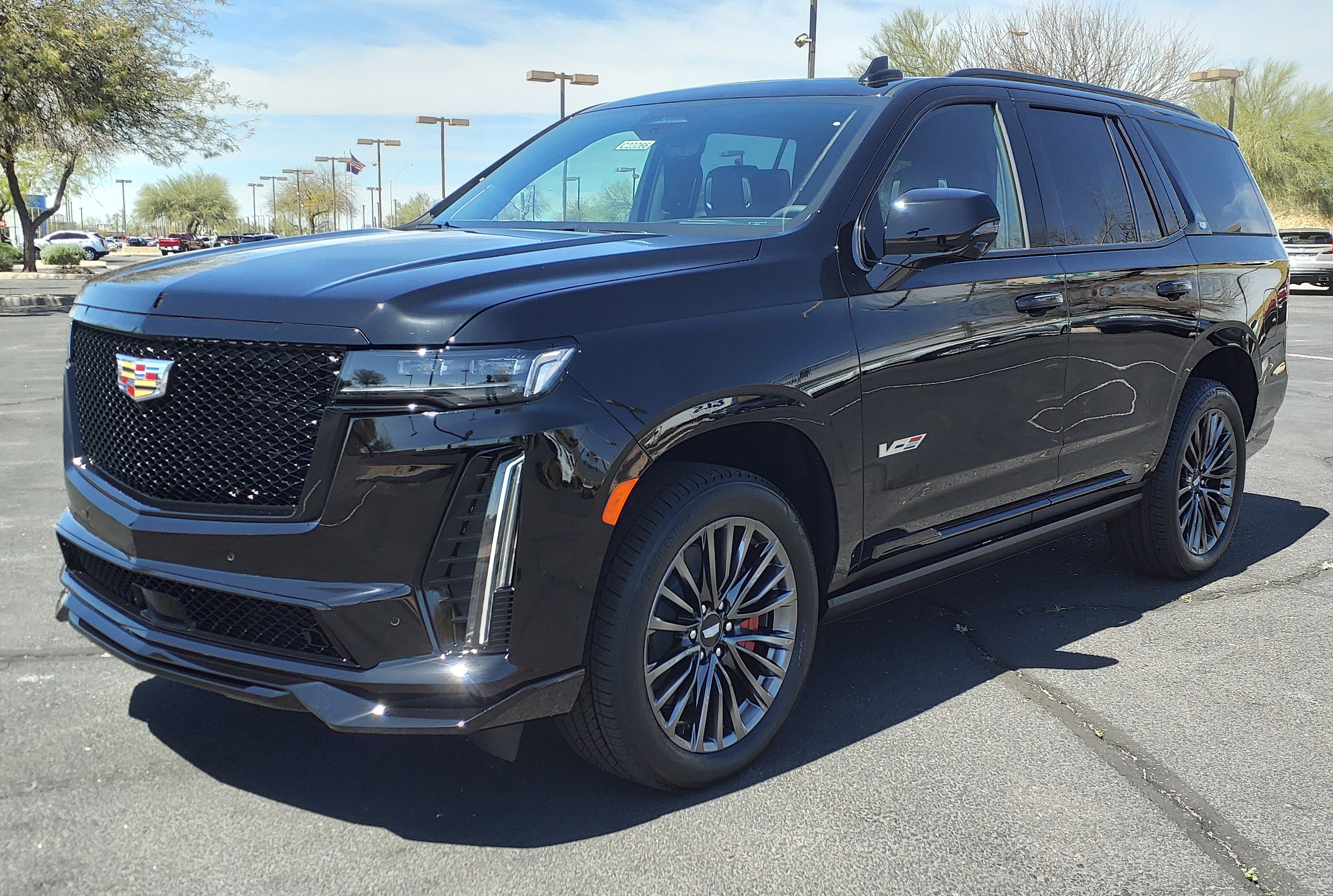
2023 Escalade-V

Cadillac launched the performance version of the Escalade in 2022, called the Escalade-V. The Escalade-V is the largest performance SUV in the American market. It uses a supercharged 6.2-liter V8 engine paired with a 10-speed automatic transmission. With an output of 682 horsepower (509 kW; 691 PS) and a 653 lb⋅ft (885 N⋅m) of torque, acceleration from 0 to 60 mph (0 to 97 km/h) takes 4.4 seconds. The vehicle features a full-time all-wheel drive system, so engine power is always being distributed to both axles. Normally set up for a 50/50 torque distribution, V-mode allows the AWD to be tailored to the desired setting of the driver. The torque split front-to-rear can be adjusted between a ratio of 50/50 in Snow, 40/60 in Tour, and 30/70 in Sport. The suggested price starts at $149,990. There is also a longer wheelbase model available as the Escalade-V ESV (sometimes referred to as the Escalade ESV-V or the V-series Escalade ESV).

=== Facelift (2025) ===
General Motors released the facelift model for the Escalade on July 17, 2024, for the 2025 model year. The changes include a new front fascia with vertical headlights borrowed from the Escalade IQ, a new illuminated crest logo on the grille, a new illuminated grille surround, the rear fascia receiving new taillights and a new bumper, new exterior colors, new alloy wheel designs, and 24-inch alloy wheels featured on the Escalade for the first time. Inside, the interior was redesigned to feature elements from the Escalade IQ, such as the new curved 55-inch display integrating both the driver and passenger displays, a new secondary lower screen used to control the vehicle settings, a new steering wheel, a new column-mounted shifter for the automatic transmission, a new Executive Second Row package which includes a center console with a rear command center, optional second row massage seats and two 12.6-inch touchscreen displays, new electrically operated side doors, and new interior color themes. The diesel engine option was discontinued from the Escalade as part of its 2025 model year facelift due to poor sales. The 2025 Escalade would also make Super Cruise a standard option included for the first three years. The Escalade-V variant received a slightly higher power output at 682 horsepower (509 kW; 691 PS).

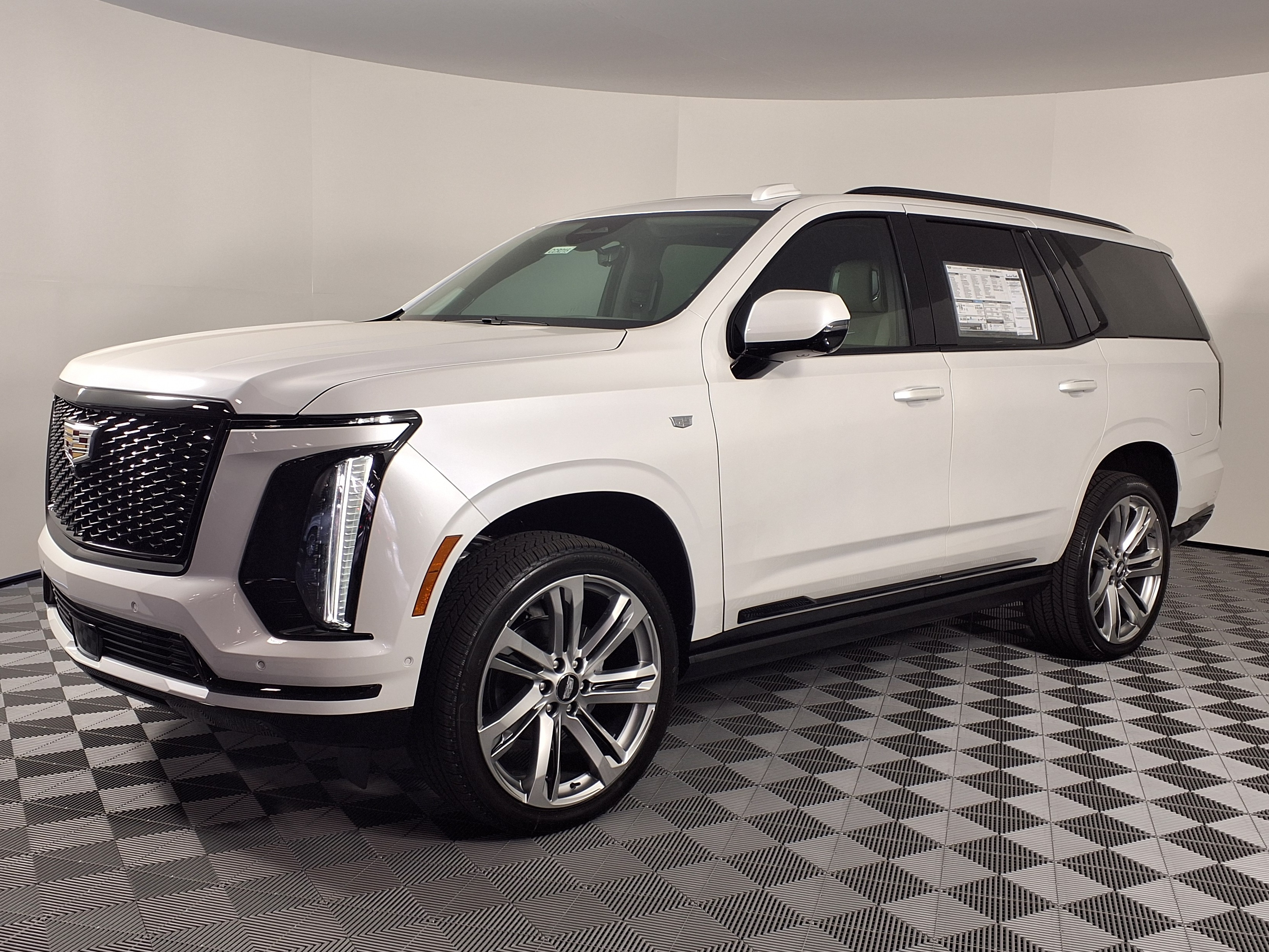
2025 Cadillac Escalade Sport Platinum

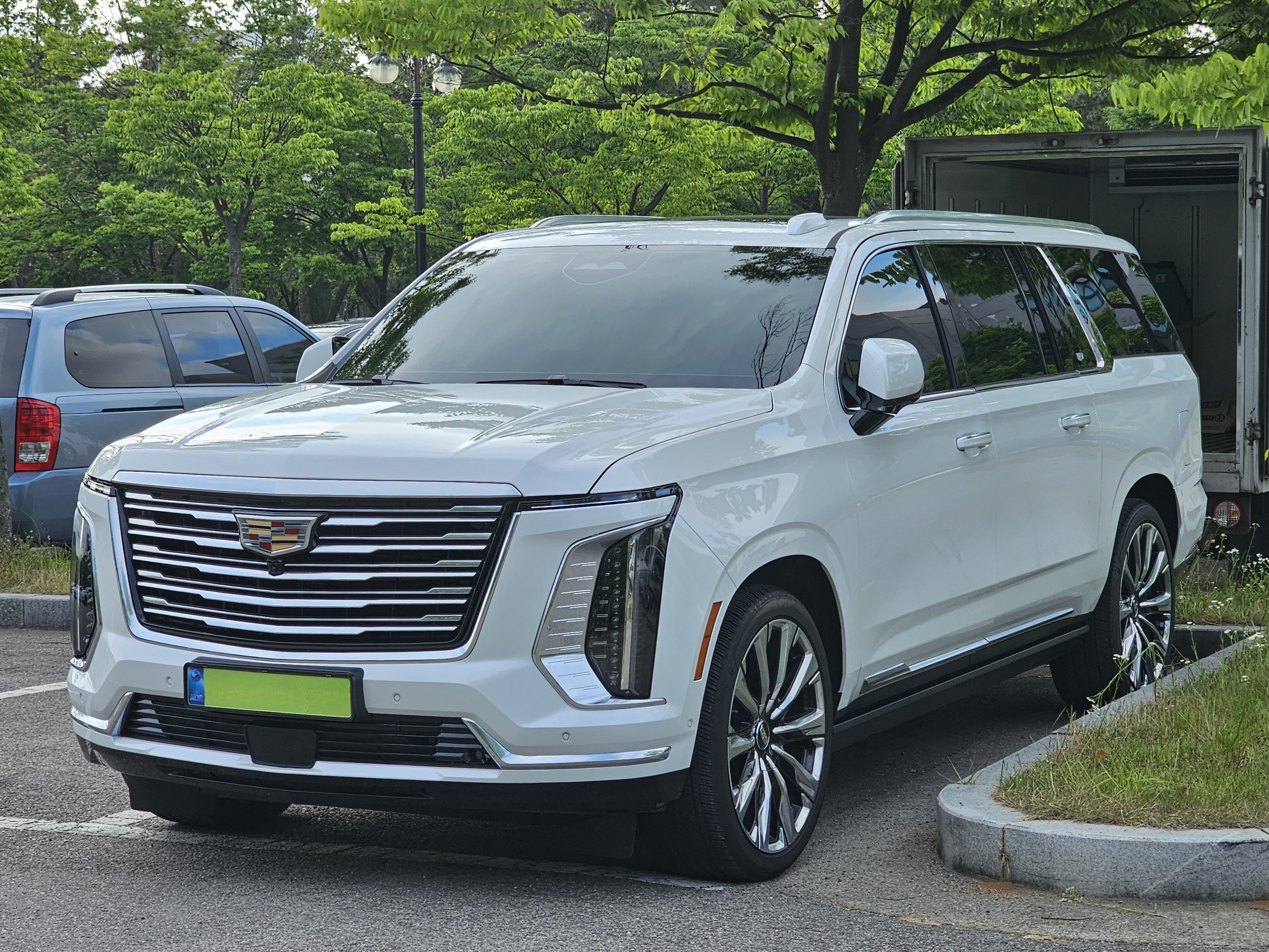
2025 Cadillac Escalade ESV Platinum

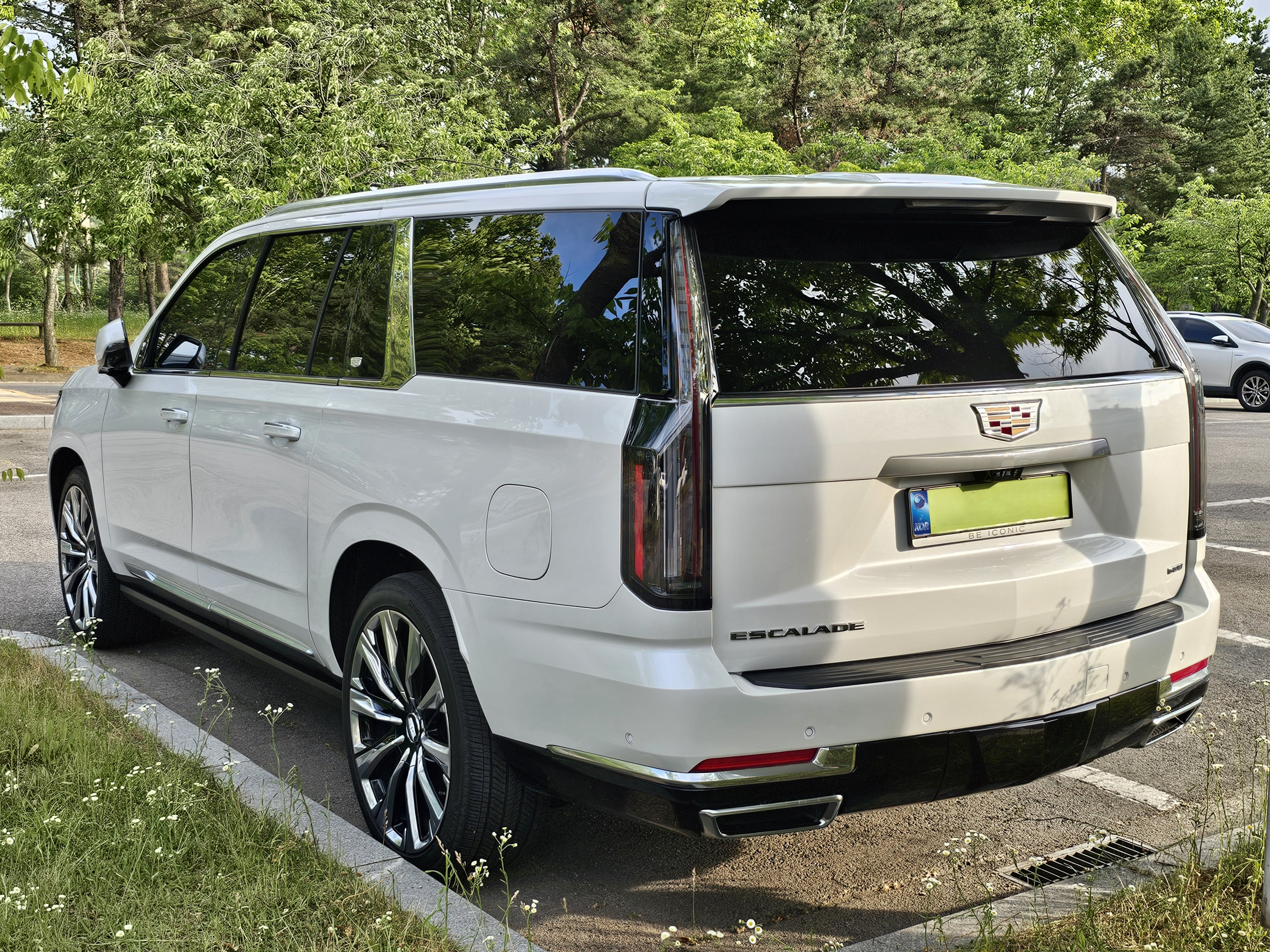
Rear View

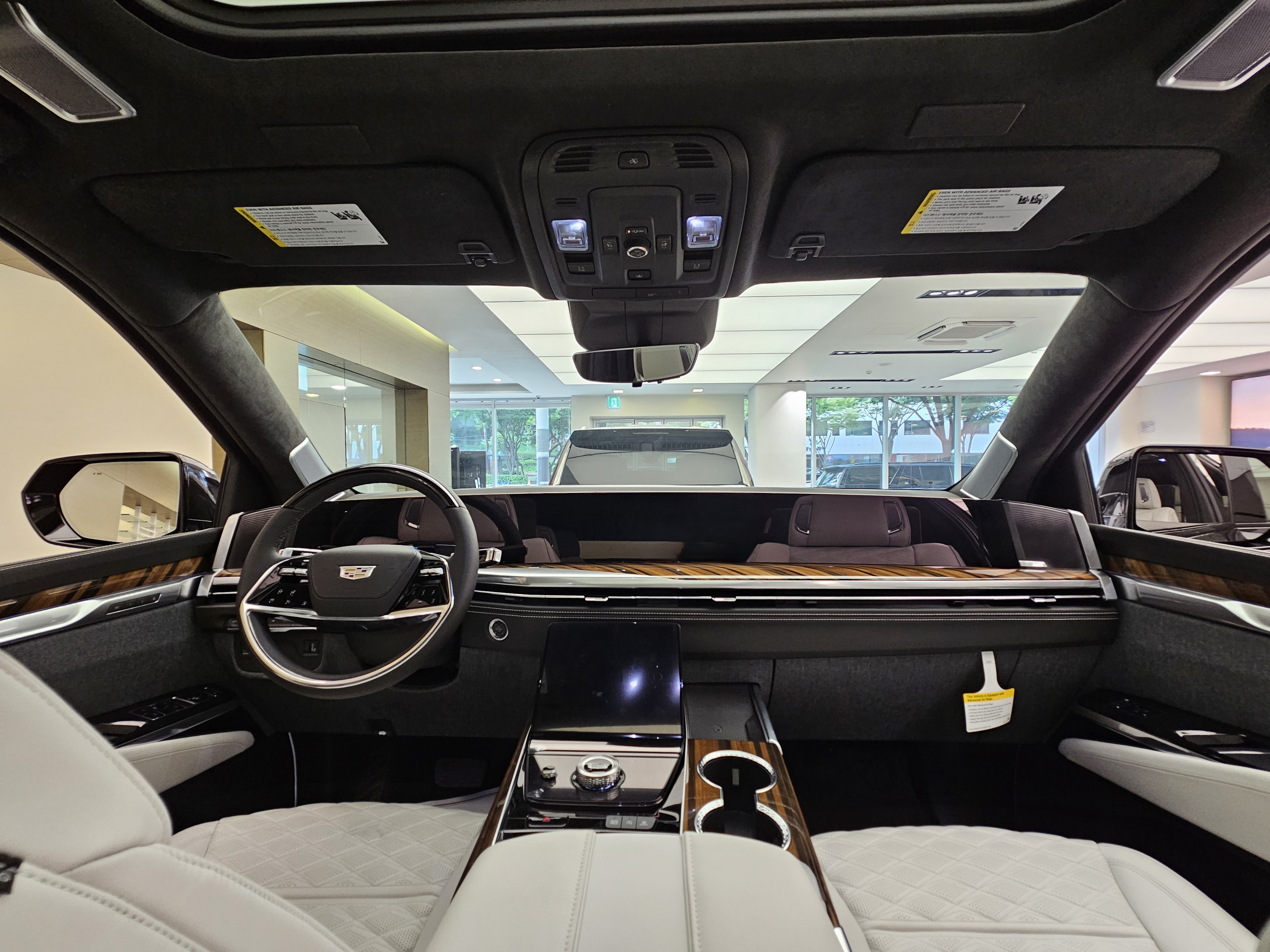
Interior

== Cadillac Escalade EXT ==
=== 1st generation (2002–2006) ===
First generation
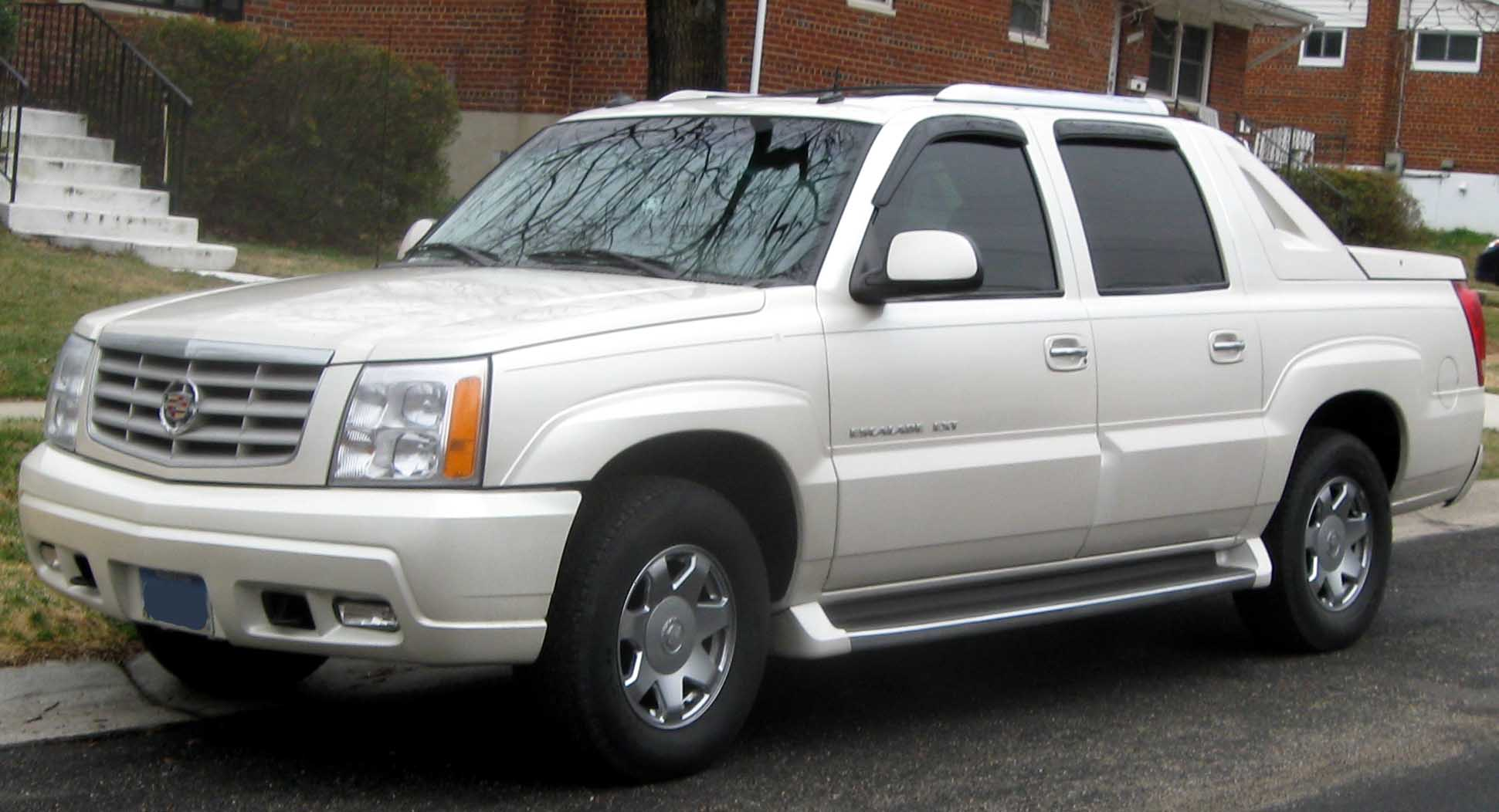

Overview
- Production: 2001–2006
- Model years: 2002–2006
- Assembly: Mexico: Silao, Guanajuato (General Motors Silao Plant)

Body and chassis
- Class: Full-size pickup truck
- Body style: 4-door pickup truck
- Layout: Front engine, rear-wheel drive; Front-engine, all-wheel drive
- Platform: GMT806
- Related: Chevrolet Avalanche; Hummer H2 SUT

Powertrain
- Engine: Gasoline: 5.3 L LM7 V8; 6.0 L LQ9 V8
- Transmission: 4-speed 4L60-E automatic

Dimensions
- Wheelbase: 130.0 in (3,302 mm)
- Length: 221.6 in (5,629 mm)
- Width: 79.5 in (2,019 mm)
- Height: 75.6 in (1,920 mm)
- Curb weight: 5,800 lb (2,631 kg)

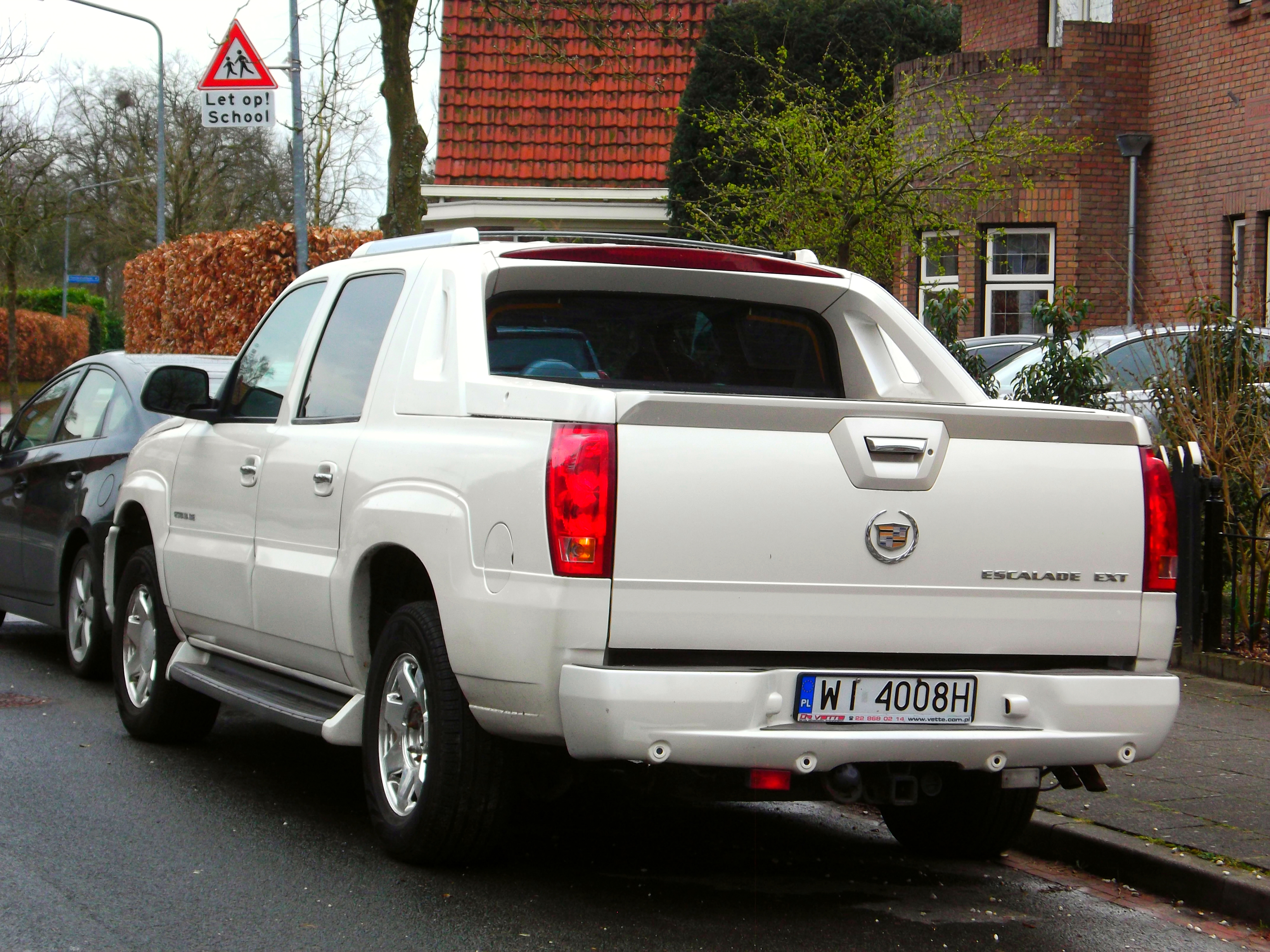
Cadillac Escalade EXT (rear view)

The Escalade EXT sport utility truck (released alongside its twin, the Chevrolet Avalanche) was introduced in 2001 (as a 2002 model) by Cadillac. It features a "Convert-a-Cab" composite pickup bed that can be expanded into the truck's cab through a bottom-hinged door. Like the Avalanche, the EXT has four full-size doors and seating for five. High-intensity discharge headlights were offered for 2003. The Escalade EXT also appears in the 2003 film The Matrix Reloaded, along with the CTS in product placement ads.

The Escalade EXT (based on the Cadillac Escalade) was created as a direct competitor to the failed Lincoln Blackwood, a pickup truck based on the Ford F-150. It had competed with the Lincoln Mark LT (now discontinued in the United States and Canada), another F-150-based pickup truck that made its debut in 2005. All Escalade EXTs were built at GM's Silao plant in Mexico.

=== 2nd generation (2007–2013) ===
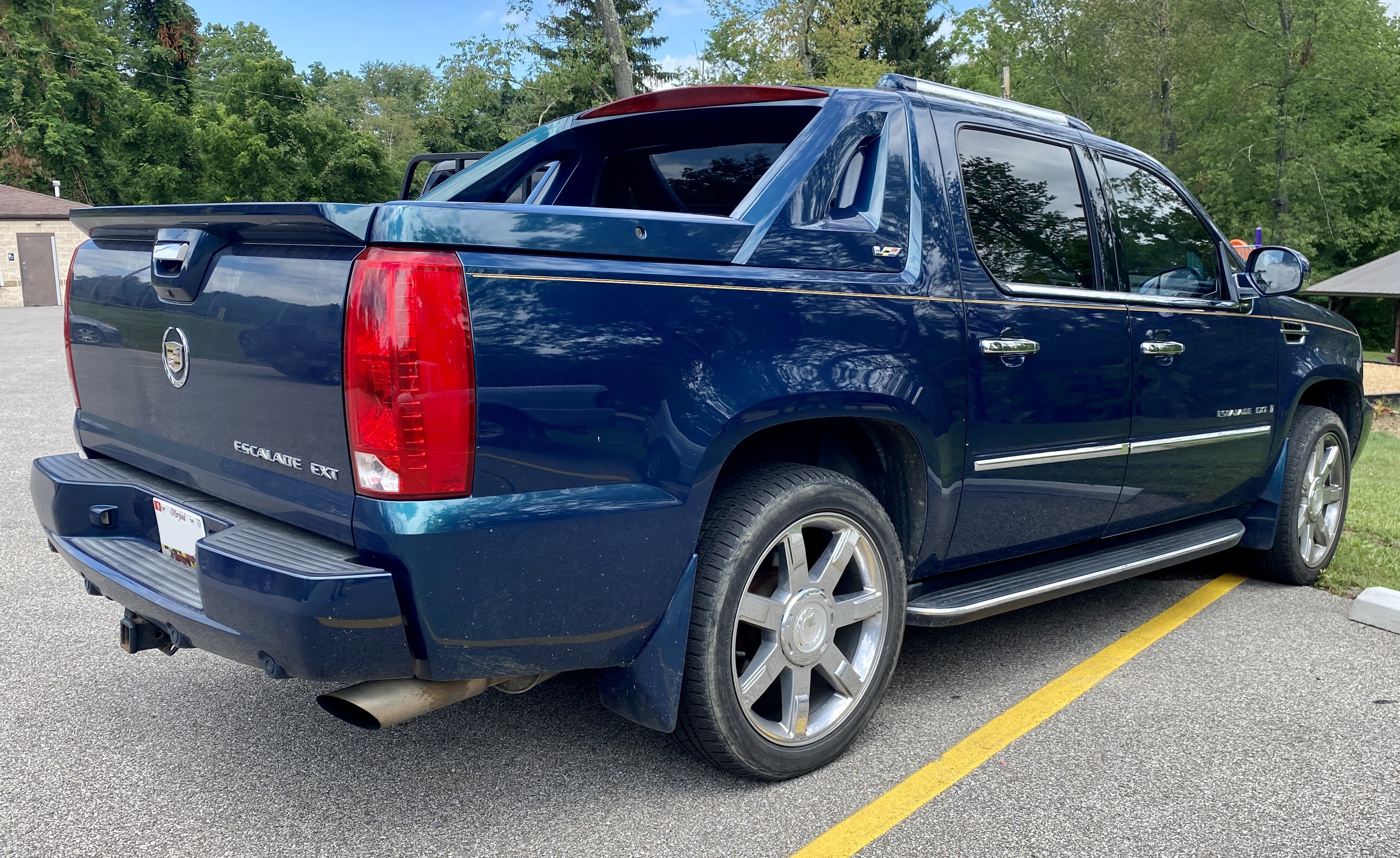
2007 Cadillac Escalade EXT in Blue Chip

Second generation
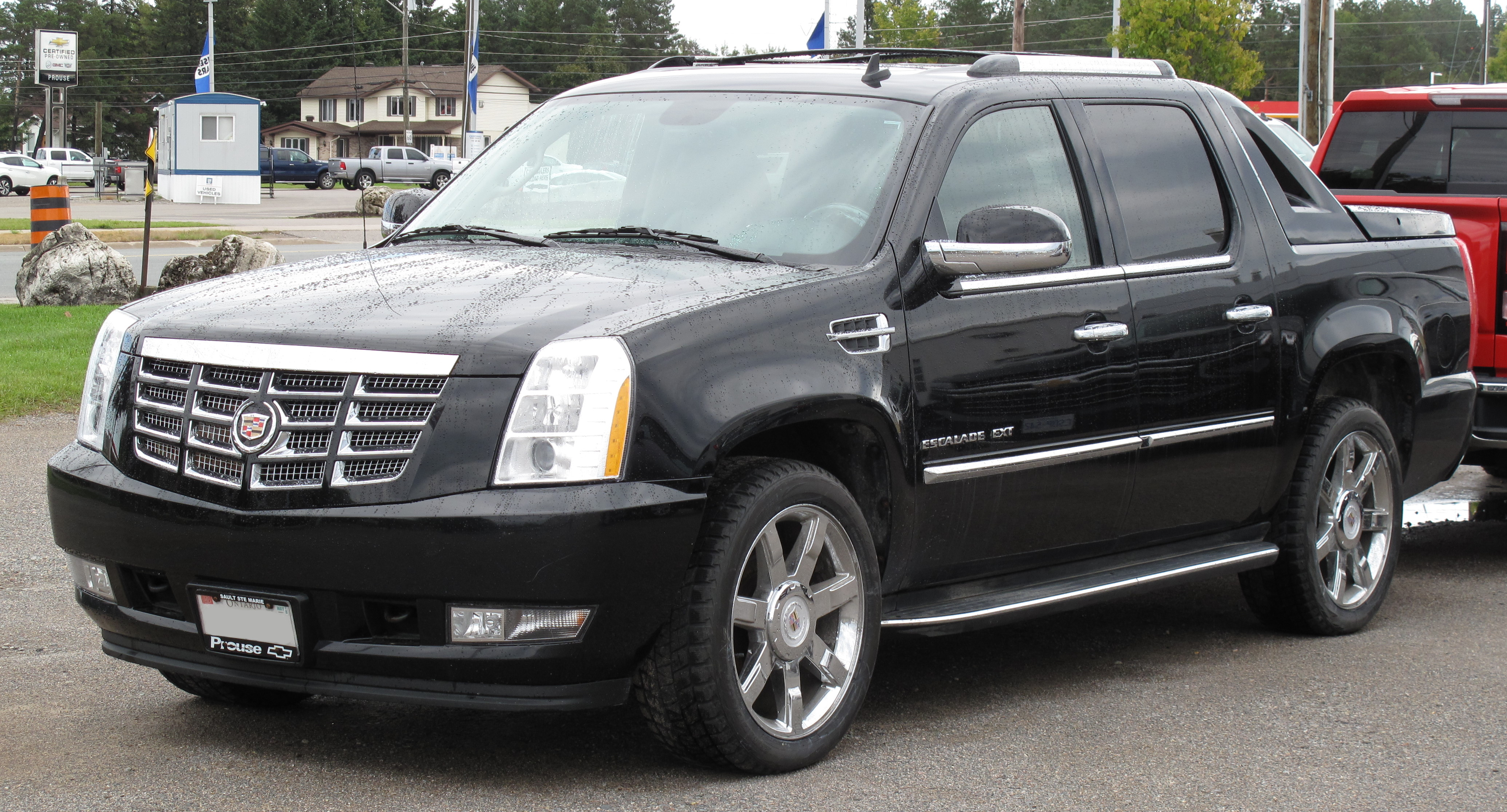

Overview
- Production: 2006–2013
- Model years: 2007–2013
- Assembly: Mexico: Silao, Guanajuato (General Motors Silao Plant)

Body and chassis
- Class: Full-size pickup truck
- Body style: 4-door pickup truck
- Layout: Front engine, rear-wheel drive; Front-engine, all-wheel drive
- Platform: GMT946

Powertrain
- Engine: Gasoline: 6.2 L L92 V8; Gasoline/E85: 6.2 L L9H V8; 6.2 L L94 V8
- Transmission: 6-speed 6L80 automatic

Dimensions
- Wheelbase: 130.0 in (3,302 mm)
- Length: 222.0 in (5,639 mm)
- Width: 79.1 in (2,009 mm)
- Height: 74.5 in (1,892 mm)
- Curb weight: 5,840 lb (2,649 kg)

The EXT models were discontinued after the 2013 model year along with the Avalanche. According to Autoblog.com, the EXT was ranked 10th among the worst-selling vehicles in the United States for 2013, with only 1,972 units sold. The Escalade EXT was available in the United States, Canada, Mexico, and the Middle East (except Israel).

== U.S. sales ==
Cadillac discontinued tracking the sales of the Escalade ESV in the United States in 2018, as GM combined the sales of both full-size and ESV versions from the 2018 model year onward.

Calendar year	Escalade	ESV	EXT	Total U.S. sales
1998	3,089	—N/a	—N/a	3,089
1999	23,897	—N/a	—N/a	23,897
2000	23,346	—N/a	—N/a	23,346
2001	31,270	—N/a	546	31,816
2002	36,114	36	13,494	49,644
2003	35,621	12,866	11,256	59,743
2004	36,994	15,618	9,638	62,250
2005	29,876	13,502	7,766	51,144
2006	39,017	16,170	7,019	62,206
2007	36,654	16,370	7,967	60,991
2008	23,947	11,054	4,709	39,710
2009	16,873	6,588	2,423	25,884
2010	16,118	8,674	2,082	26,874
2011	15,079	8,388	2,036	25,503
2012	12,615	8,083	1,934	22,632
2013	12,592	7,950	1,972	22,514
2014	19,482	10,987	53	30,522
2015	21,230	14,691	—N/a	35,921
2016	23,604	15,488	—N/a	39,092
2017	22,994	14,700	—N/a	37,694
2018	33,796	3,076	—N/a	36,872
2019	35,424	—N/a	—N/a	35,424
2020	24,547	—N/a	—N/a	24,547
2021	40,505	—N/a	—N/a	40,505
2022	40,247	—N/a	—N/a	40,247
2023	41,689	—N/a	—N/a	41,689
2024	41,001	—N/a	—N/a	41,001
2025	49,366	—N/a	—N/a	49,366

== Popular culture ==
The second generation turned out to be popular among numerous celebrities, being owned by numerous athletes, rappers, musicians, and actors. The vehicle was frequently featured in music videos by artists such as Nelly, 50 Cent, Jay-Z, Jennifer Lopez, Chingy, and others. The vehicle has been seen as a popular icon in hip-hop, being referenced in numerous songs as a status symbol.

In 2021, filmmaker Spike Lee was hired to create a short film to introduce the 2021 version.
