= Costin Sports Roadster =

Unreleased sports car

The Costin Sports Roadster is a lightweight mid-engined sports car that was intended for initial launch in the mid-1990s. A prototype test bed chassis was finished in 1991 at Costin Ltd in Wales.

The original Costin Cars were designed by the aerodynamicist Frank Costin. Costin had previous associations with Vanwall, Lotus, Maserati, and Dealer Team Vauxhall (DTV) for race car chassis designs. A modern design update of the original Costin Sports Roadster, was designed and hand sculpted full size in wood and plastic filler by William P. (Bill) Barranco in 1994 in London UK. In absit 1995, the first two (2) prototypes were built in the mid nineties with revised body styling but was not road registered until recently. In total 6 chassis were constructed and 2 bodies were produced from the FRP molds. The company Costin Ltd went into liquidation following unsuccessful attempts to find funding for the venture.

== See also ==
- TMC Costin
