= Costin Amigo =

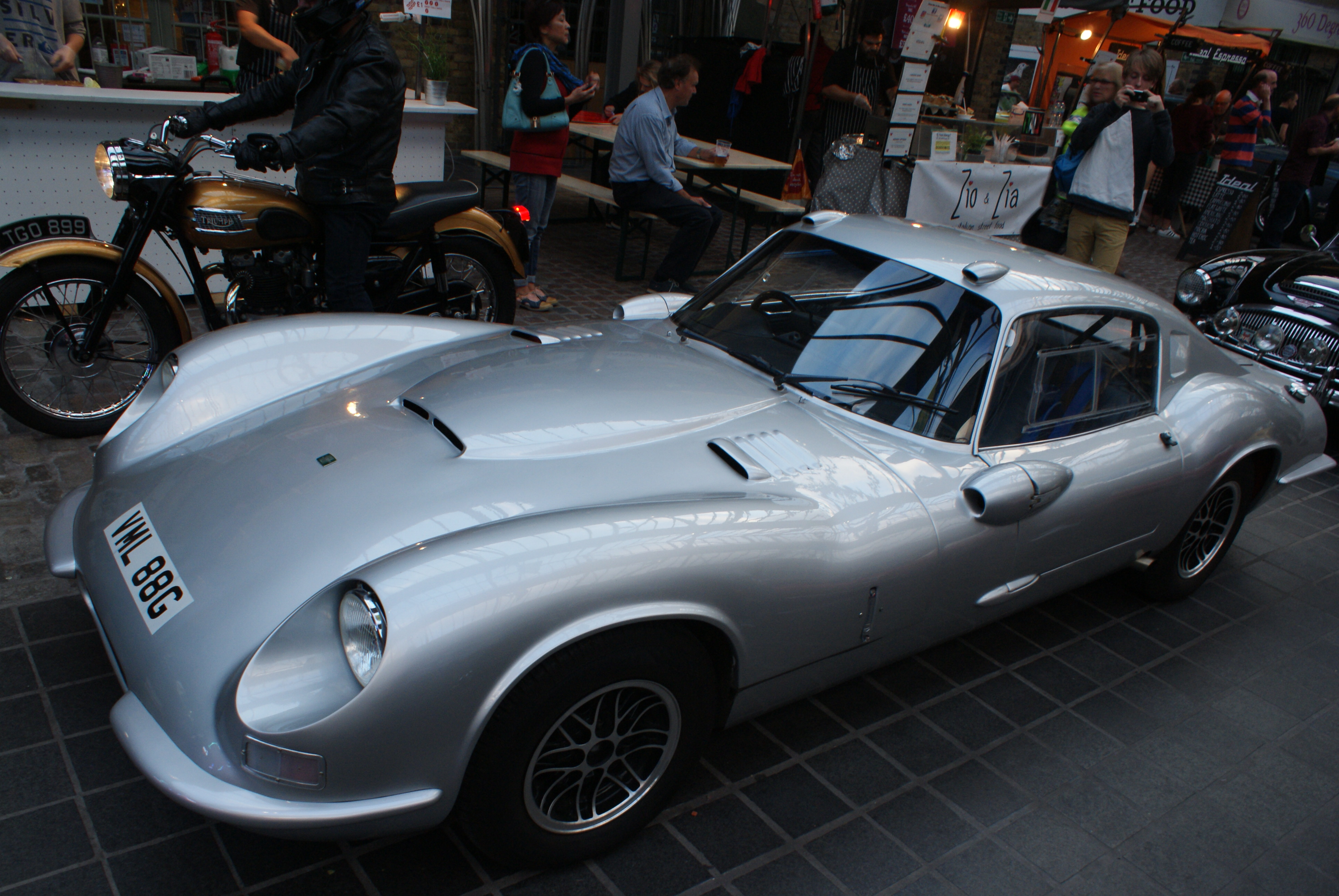

Overview
- Manufacturer: Costin Automotive Racing Products Ltd.
- Production: 1970–1972
- Designer: Frank Costin

Body and chassis
- Class: Sports car
- Body style: 2 door coupé
- Layout: F/R

Powertrain
- Engine: 1,975 cc (120.5 cu in) I4
- Transmission: 4-speed manual with overdrive

Dimensions
- Wheelbase: 2,448 mm (96.4 in)
- Length: 4,140 mm (163.0 in)
- Width: 1,677 mm (66.0 in)
- Height: 1,067 mm (42.0 in)
- Kerb weight: 658 kg (1,451 lb)

The Costin Amigo is a lightweight sports car built in the United Kingdom from 1970 to 1972. The Amigo was designed by Frank Costin and built by Costin Automotive Racing Products Ltd. The car's chassis is made of timbers and plywood.

== History ==
Frank Costin was an engineer who started his career in aviation design and later moved into automobiles and auto racing. He is considered to have been one of the preeminent aerodynamicists of his time. In Costin's personal history of automotive designs, the Amigo was Auto Project XVIII. The name was chosen to denote a car that was driver friendly.

The goals set by Costin for the Amigo included the capability to cruise at a steady 100 mph (161 km/h) with an engine speed below 5000 rpm, the ability to cover 250 mi (400 km) without tiring the driver or stopping for fuel while carrying adequate luggage for the trip, and a rate of fuel consumption of 30 mpg_{‑imp} (9.4 L/100 km; 25.0 mpg_{‑US}).

The project was started in 1968, while Costin was still based in North Wales. It subsequently moved to Little Staughton, Bedfordshire, and finally to a location near Luton, where Vauxhall had a large factory. The car was officially announced in December 1970.

Production of the prototype was financed by television industry executive Jack Wiggins. Additional backing was provided by Paul Pycroft de Ferranti.

The Amigo's selling price was set at £3,326 78p.

Some sources say only eight of the cars were ever built, while others say the total was nine. One reports a total of nine with two cars left incomplete when production ended, one of those later completed in 1979.

== Features ==
=== Chassis and body ===
The car's chassis is described as a wooden monocoque. This was not the first such structure designed and built by Costin. In 1959 he had partnered with Jem Marsh to start Marcos Engineering and produce the timber chassis Marcos GT Xylon that debuted in 1959. In 1965 the Costin-Nathan sports racer was launched, funded by Roger Nathan. And in 1967 the Costin-Harris Protos open wheel car started to be raced by Ron Harris Racing in Formula Two (F2) events, as well as one appearance in Formula One (F1) at the 1967 German Grand Prix joint F1/F2 event at the Nürburgring.

The Amigo's chassis is made up of six interconnected torsion boxes. Three longitudinal boxes form the car's center tunnel and left and right sill boxes, and three lateral boxes define the engine compartment, cockpit, and boot and rear suspension bay. The underside of the car is enclosed with the exception of some service openings. The chassis is made of gaboon plywood. Parana pine replaces the Sitka spruce used by Costin on the earlier Marcos structure for jointing strips and local reinforcements. The wooden components are bonded with Aerolite adhesive from Ciba.

The completed chassis weighs 187 lb (84.8 kg). Torsional stiffness is 3,500 foot-pounds (4,750 N⋅m) per degree of twist. Rollover protection is provided by a triangulated steel tube attached to the double-boxed rear bulkhead.

The fiberglass body is bonded to the chassis with an Araldite adhesive, but is not structural. Its shape includes a reverse or reflex camber line like the one Costin had used in his aerodynamic refinements of the body of the original Lotus Elite. This contributes to aerodynamic stability at speed, although it is said to be detrimental to the same when in traffic.

An unusual feature on some cars is a fin-like pylon that is attached just ahead of the trailing edge of the roof and is topped by a small red lamp.

Costin's focus on aerodynamic efficiency meant that even items like the external mirrors were subject to rigorous scrutiny. The car's drag coefficient ($\scriptstyle C_\mathrm d\,$) is 0.29.

=== Running gear ===
Much of the car's running gear is sourced from Vauxhall, with many parts coming from the VX 4/90 in particular.

The front suspension includes the crossmember from a Vauxhall Victor along with the Vauxhall's front suspension of upper and lower wishbones and coil springs. Custom trailing arms of Costin's design were added. The rear suspension employs a Vauxhall Victor live axle with leading arms, coil springs, and a Panhard rod. The damper units are special self-leveling Koni pieces, that were only otherwise made available to Ferrari.

Brakes are the same front disc and rear drum assemblies used on the Vauxhall.

=== Power train ===
Motive power comes from a 2.0 L Vauxhall Slant-4 engine. Some references mention a 2.3 L version of the same engine. The larger engine does not appear to have been used except in modified cars. The engine is paired with a four-speed manual transmission also from Vauxhall, augmented by a de Normanville overdrive manufactured by Laycock Engineering.

A limited-slip differential was substituted for the original Vauxhall unit.

=== Performance ===
The car is reported to be capable of a top speed in the range of 127–137 mph (204–220 km/h), and able to accelerate from 0–60 mph (0–97 km/h) in from 7.1 to 7.5 seconds.

== Technical data ==
Costin Amigo:	Detail:
Engine:	Front-mounted Inline four engine
Displacement:	1,975 cc (120.5 cu in)
Bore × Stroke:	95.25 mm × 69.24 mm (3.75 in × 2.73 in)
Maximum power:	106 hp (79.0 kW) at 5800 rpm
Maximum torque:	115 ft⋅lb (155.9 N⋅m) at 3200 rpm
Compression ratio:	8.5:1
Valvetrain:	Single overhead camshaft (SOHC), 2 valves per cylinder
Induction:	Naturally aspirated
Cooling:	Water
Transmission:	4-speed manual with overdrive
Steering:	Rack and pinion. 3.5 turns lock-to-lock
Brakes f/r:	Disc/drum
Suspension front:	Upper and lower wishbones with custom trailing links. Coil springs and self-leveling Koni dampers. Anti-roll bar
Suspension rear:	Live axle with leading arms and Panhard rod. Coil springs and self-leveling Koni dampers
Body/Chassis:	Glass reinforced plastic (GRP) body. Wooden chassis
Track f/r:	1,372 / 1,372 mm (54.0 / 54.0 in)
Weight distribution % f/r:	49.1/50.9
Wheelbase:	2,448 mm (96.4 in)
Fuel capacity:	39 L (8.6 imp gal; 10.3 US gal)
Tires f/r:	70 HR 13 / 70 HR 13
Length; Width; Height:	4,140 mm (163.0 in); 1,677 mm (66.0 in); 1,067 mm (42.0 in)
Weight:	658 kg (1,450.6 lb)

== Motorsports ==
Amigo chassis number 060 appeared in the 3 Hours of Le Mans in 1971. The car was powered by a Lotus-Ford Twin Cam engine tuned by Brian Hart. Hart was also the driver, and was partnered with Paul Pycroft de Ferranti, although Pycroft never took the wheel. The car did not finish.

With its Hart-tuned Lotus-Ford engine the car was capable of a top speed in excess of 147 mph (237 km/h), and was able to reach 60 mph (100 km/h) from a standing start in 5.5 seconds.

Driven by Gerry Marshall, chassis 060 won at Thruxton Circuit the same year. At this point the car had a 2.3 L slant four tuned by Bill Blydenstein to Dealer Team Vauxhall (DTV) specifications. The car was later completely rebuilt by Blydenstein, with a freshened dry sump 2.3 litre engine, a 5-speed ZF transmission and dual circuit brakes.
