= Panoz Roadster =

Panoz Roadster, AIV Roadster
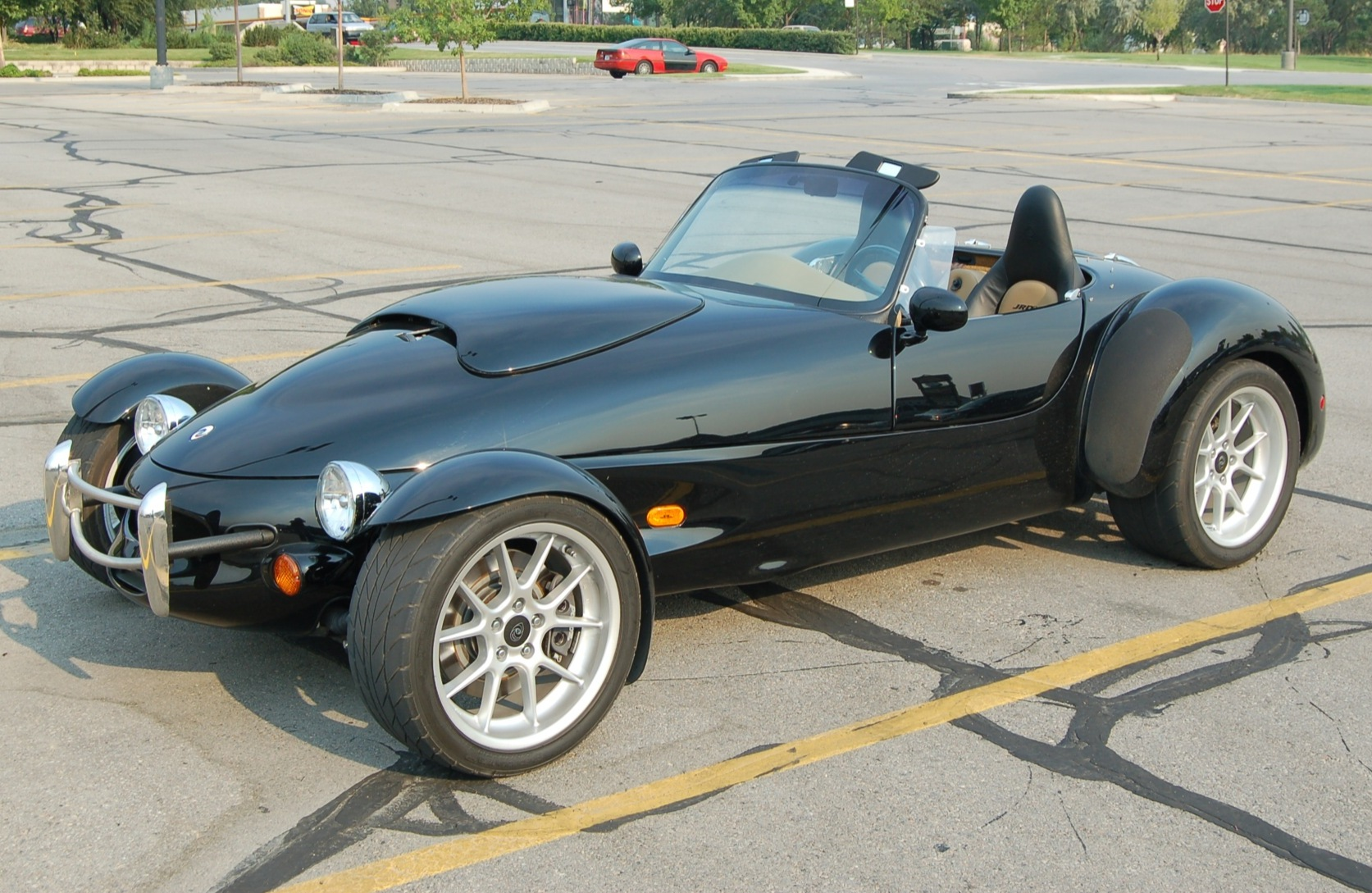

Overview
- Manufacturer: Panoz Auto Development Company
- Production: 1992–1995 (44 Roadsters produced); 1996–1999 (176 AIVs produced)
- Assembly: Braselton, Georgia, U.S.
- Designer: Freeman Thomas

Body and chassis
- Class: Sports car
- Body style: 2-door roadster
- Layout: FMR layout
- Related: TMC Costin

Powertrain
- Engine: 4.6 L Ford Modular DOHC 32v V8 (AIV); 4.9 L Ford 5.0 V8 (Roadster)
- Transmission: 5-speed Borg-Warner T-5 manual; 5-speed Tremec T-45 manual

Dimensions
- Wheelbase: 104.5 in (2,650 mm)
- Length: 159 in (4,000 mm)
- Width: 76.7 in (1,950 mm)
- Height: 52 in (1,300 mm)
- Curb weight: 2,571 lb (1,166 kg) (AIV)

The Panoz Roadster is a sports car launched in 1992 by the American manufacturer Panoz Auto Development Company of Georgia. The Roadster was succeeded by the AIV Roadster in 1997. They were built using aluminum, similar to that of the Plymouth Prowler first sold several years later in 1997. The Panoz Roadster was the first American-built aluminum intensive vehicle.

== Development ==
Panoz had purchased the rights to a frame designed by Frank Costin used in a defunct Irish sportscar called the TMC Costin. Panoz had Freeman Thomas design a new body for the car. Aluminum body panels were produced by Superform USA in Riverside, CA, resulting in bodywork both light and strong. Ford Mustang running gear and engine were used, including the solid rear axle and independent front suspension, as well as the Borg-Warner T-5 (later updated to the T-45) manual five-speed unit. A seven-man crew built the first ten cars, and other workers were added later to the production team. The Costin chassis was never put under a production car, instead the early Roadsters featured a TIG welded stainless steel tubing frame, and extensive use of CNC machined and stamped parts.

== Roadster ==
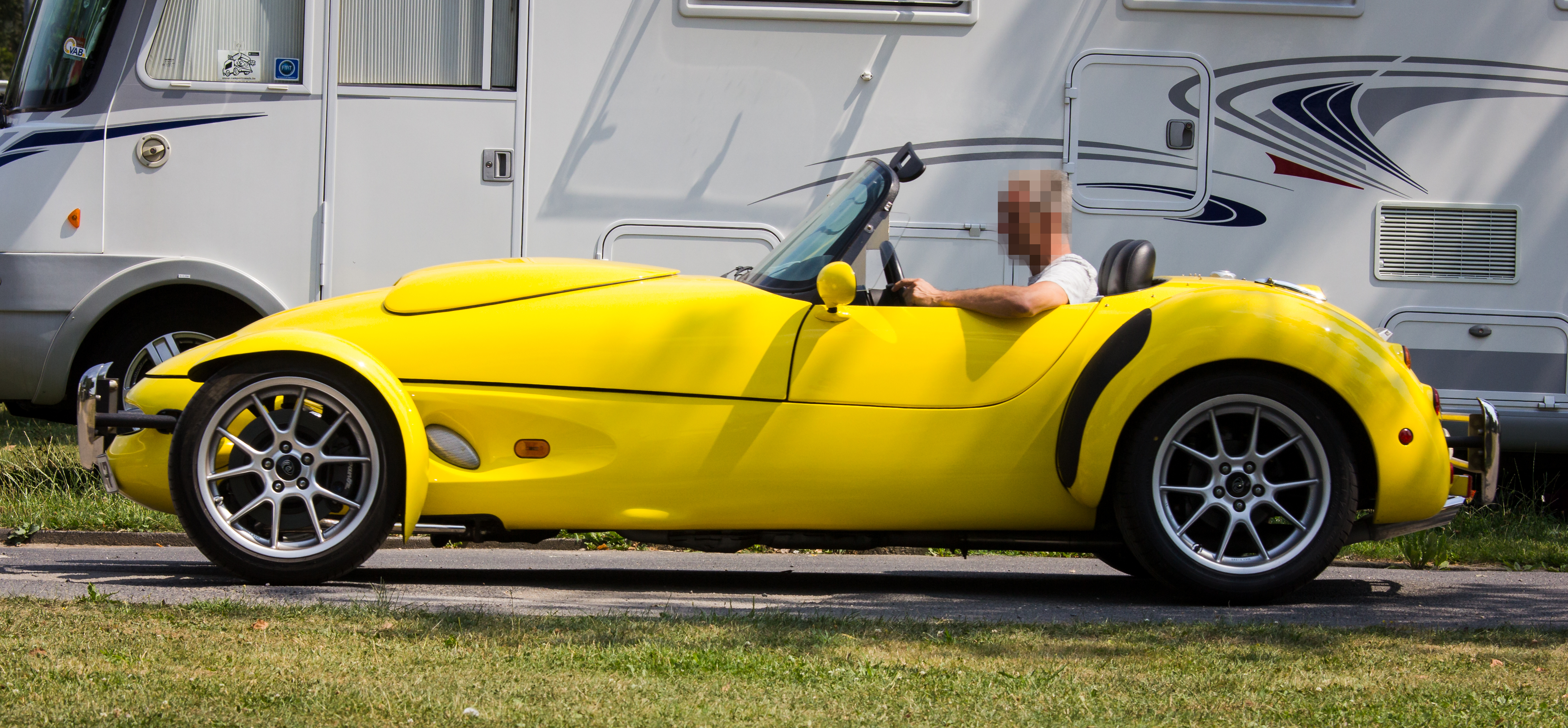
Panoz Roadster side view

The Roadster had no top or tonneau cover, and no provision or intention of having either. No automatic transmission was offered, only the 5-speed manual. A small heater core delivered warmth to the windshield for defrosting, since the US DOT requirements mandated it. There was no radio, no heater, no air conditioner, and furthermore no place to install any of those.

Some Roadsters were fitted with a custom engraved plate atop the intake manifold with the owner’s name and the Panoz logo. A few cars were built to a factory specification, but most were custom ordered by the individual buyers.

There were a number of changes that took place over the course of production, but in general the cars were quite similar. Roadster production continued to 1995. Two prototypes were built, and a further 44 cars were manufactured and sold to the public.

== AIV Roadster ==
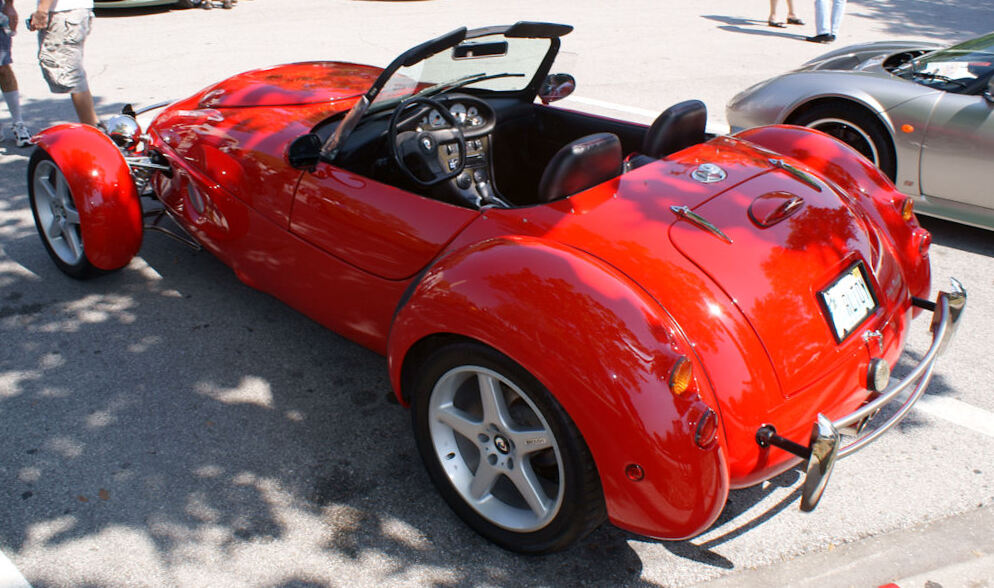
1998 Panoz AIV Roadster rear

Starting in 1994 Panoz developed an aluminum chassis for the Roadster. This new chassis would both reduce assembly time (yet 350 man hours were still put into each copy), and reduce weight, which in turn improved performance. In 1996 a new prototype was unveiled, which differed substantially from the original car. It had an extruded aluminum space frame with a central backbone. Special adhesives were used to attach the frame and body. Equally important, an entirely new drive train was used, the 1996 Mustang SVT Cobra all aluminum, V-8 DOHC 32 valve motor. Consequently, the new Roadster was at approximately 70% aluminum and was dubbed an Aluminum Intensive Vehicle, the AIV Roadster.

The new engine produced 305 hp (227 kW) and 300 ft⋅lbf (407 N⋅m) of torque. Combined with the lighter chassis this increased the car's power-to-weight ratio significantly. With the weight savings, an air conditioner was installed with little overall weight or performance change.

The final year of AIV Roadster production was 1999. In 1999, 10 were modified with a special paint called 'Titanium', supercharged, equipped with a blue leather interior, and signed to create the 10th anniversary edition Panoz AIV Roadster. Total production of the AIV consisted of 6 prototypes and a further 176 production models sold to the public. Some cars built in 1999 were not sold until 2000.

=== Video games ===
The Panoz Roadster has been featured in the Midtown Madness racing game series. The car also more recently features in rFactor 2.

=== Specifications of AIV Roadster ===
| Top speed | 140 mph (225 km/h) |
| Acceleration 0-60 mph (0–97 km/h) | 4.3 seconds |
| Engine type | V8 DOHC 32 valves |
| Displacement | 281 ci (4,604 cc) |
| Transmission | 5-speed manual |
| Maximum power | 305 bhp (227 kW; 309 PS) @ 5,800 rpm |
| Maximum torque | 300 ft·lbf (410 Nm) @ 4,800 rpm |
| Weight | 2,570 lb (1,170 kg) |
| Fuel economy | 19.9 mpg (7.04 L/100 km) |

=== Production Details ===
| Exterior Color | 1997 | 1998 | 1999 | Total |
|---|---|---|---|---|
| Black Gloss | 0 | 0 | 8 | 8 |
| Black Metallic | 19 | 13 | 2 | 34 |
| Blue | 3 | 7 | 0 | 10 |
| Blue Metallic | 0 | 0 | 2 | 2 |
| British Racing Green | 0 | 1 | 0 | 1 |
| Cabernet | 0 | 6 | 0 | 6 |
| Copper Bronze Extreme | 0 | 1 | 0 | 1 |
| Green | 4 | 4 | 0 | 8 |
| Ocean Extreme | 0 | 6 | 0 | 6 |
| Pearl White | 0 | 1 | 0 | 1 |
| Red | 21 | 19 | 2 | 42 |
| Silver | 2 | 7 | 14 | 23 |
| Sunburst Yellow | 0 | 7 | 0 | 7 |
| Titanium | 0 | 0 | 11 | 11 |
| Yellow | 0 | 0 | 16 | 16 |
| Total | 49 | 72 | 55 | 176 |
