= Vauxhall Slant-4 engine =

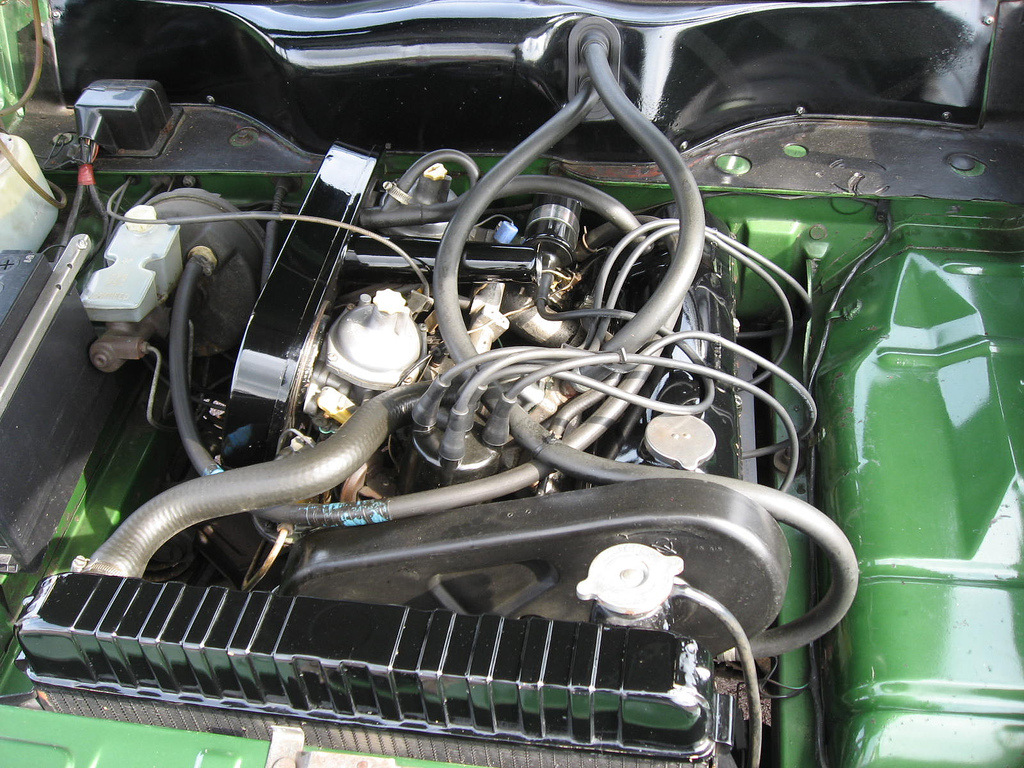

Overview
- Manufacturer: Vauxhall Motors
- Production: September 1967 - July 1983

Layout
- Configuration: Naturally aspirated inline-four
- Displacement: 1,599 cc (97.6 cu in); 1,759 cc (107.3 cu in); 1,979 cc (120.8 cu in); 2,279 cc (139.1 cu in)
- Cylinder bore: 85.73 mm (3.375 in); 95.25 mm (3.750 in); 97.4 mm (3.83 in)
- Piston stroke: 69.24 mm (2.726 in); 76.2 mm (3.00 in)
- Cylinder block material: Cast iron
- Cylinder head material: Cast iron
- Valvetrain: SOHC 2 or 4 valves x cyl.
- Compression ratio: 7.3:1, 8.5:1, 9.2:1

Combustion
- Fuel system: Carburettor
- Fuel type: Petrol
- Oil system: Wet sump
- Cooling system: Water-cooled

Output
- Power output: 69.2–135 bhp (51.6–100.7 kW)
- Torque output: 83–145.5 lb⋅ft (112.5–197.3 N⋅m)

Chronology
- Successor: Opel cam-in-head engine

The Vauxhall Slant-4 (or Slant Four) is an inline four-cylinder petrol car engine manufactured by Vauxhall Motors. Unveiled in 1966, it was one of the first production overhead camshaft designs to use a timing belt to drive the camshaft. The Slant-4 block was used as a development mule for the Lotus 900 series of engines. Vauxhall used the engine in a variety of models until production ended in 1983.

== History ==
=== Design ===
The Slant-4 gets its name from the fact that its cylinders are inclined at an angle of approximately 45° from vertical. This layout came about because Vauxhall had originally planned to develop a whole family of engines all built on the same production line. There were to be slant-4s and V8s in both petrol and diesel versions, designed under the guidance of Vauxhall's then chief engineer, John Alden. Although a V8 petrol prototype and several 4-cylinder diesel prototypes were built only the 4-cylinder petrol engine made it to series production.

The engine has a single overhead camshaft driven by a timing belt. The Slant-4 was one of three engines using this method of driving the camshaft released the same year, the others being the Fiat Twin Cam engine and the Pontiac straight-6 OHC. Prior to 1966, belt-driven camshafts had only appeared in the Glas 1004 series starting in 1962 and in the few Devin-Panhard cars built starting in 1956. The camshaft operated two valves per cylinder. An ingenious valve train design incorporating an inclined socket head cap screw allowed valve clearances to be adjusted with a feeler gauge and an Allen key. The block and crossflow head are both of cast iron. The layout lowers the overall height of the engine, which allowed for more aerodynamic vehicle bodies to be achieved by lowering the bonnet line. It also means most of the engine is very easy to access for maintenance, with the exception of the exhaust manifold and spark plugs, which are "underneath" the slanted cylinders.

=== Applications ===
Prototype engines were fitted to the FC Victor, and the engine also appeared in the Vauxhall XVR concept car. The first production car to use the engine was the 1967 FD Victor. The original engine capacities were 1,599 cc (97.6 cu in) and 1,975 cc (120.5 cu in). For the 1972 launch of the FE Victor, the smaller engine was increased to 1,759 cc (107.3 cu in), and the larger to 2,279 cc (139.1 cu in). Blydenstein Racing developed a long stroke version with a capacity of 2,600 cc (158.7 cu in) capable of producing almost 250 hp (186 kW). Having been designed to withstand the stresses of diesel compression ignition, the block is immensely strong and able to handle large increases in power without modification. The crank was also designed to be shared with the diesel version, which meant its strength was assured for the petrol version. The larger displacement versions are known for their immense torque, but also as not very smooth running or high-revving. A fuel-injected version of the 2.3-litre engine was planned for both the HP Firenza and VX4/90. Running prototypes were tested before the project was abandoned due to cost and the impending merger of Vauxhall's design and engineering pool with that of Opel in Germany.

Apart from its use in passenger cars, the engine was also developed for marine applications. It grew popular with tuners due to its great strength, tunability and simplicity. A 2-litre version of the Slant-4 powered the eight Costin Amigos that were built between 1970 and 1972. The engine remained in production well into the 1980s for the Bedford CF van.

Although arguably more technically advanced, the Slant-4 was considered less reliable than its continental GM counterpart, the Opel CIH (Cam In Head) engine. The Slant-4 was replaced by the CIH in the badge-engineered Vauxhall Cavalier Mk.1s from the mid 1970s onward, whilst the Bedford CF van lost the Slant-4 in favour of the CIH when revised in 1983.

== Engine specifications ==
Displacement	Bore x Stroke	Compression ratio	Power (net)	Torque	Year(s)	Notes
1,599 cc (97.6 cu in)	85.73 mm × 69.24 mm (3.375 in × 2.726 in)	8.5:1	72 bhp (54 kW) at 5600 rpm	83 lb⋅ft (113 N⋅m) at 2200 rpm	1967 to 1972	
1,599 cc (97.6 cu in)	85.73 mm × 69.24 mm (3.375 in × 2.726 in)	8.5:1	69.2 bhp (51.6 kW) at 5100 rpm	90 lb⋅ft (122 N⋅m) at 2500 rpm	1970 to 1972	Low-lift camshaft.
1,759 cc (107.3 cu in)	85.73 mm × 76.2 mm (3.375 in × 3.000 in)	8.5:1	77 bhp (57 kW) at 5100 rpm	97 lb⋅ft (132 N⋅m) at 3000 rpm	1972 to 1975	
1,759 cc (107.3 cu in)	85.73 mm × 76.2 mm (3.375 in × 3.000 in)	8.5:1	88 bhp (66 kW) at 5800 rpm	99 lb⋅ft (134 N⋅m) at 3500 rpm	1976 onwards	
1,975 cc (120.5 cu in)	95.25 mm × 69.24 mm (3.750 in × 2.726 in)	8.5:1	88 bhp (66 kW) at 5500 rpm	102 lb⋅ft (138 N⋅m) at 3200 rpm	1967 to 1972	
1,975 cc (120.5 cu in)	95.25 mm × 69.24 mm (3.750 in × 2.726 in)	7.3:1	77.5 bhp (57.8 kW) at 5100 rpm	100.5 lb⋅ft (136 N⋅m) at 2800 rpm	1971 to 1972	Canadian spec.
1,975 cc (120.5 cu in)	95.25 mm × 69.24 mm (3.750 in × 2.726 in)	8.5:1	104 bhp (78 kW) at 5600 rpm	117 lb⋅ft (159 N⋅m) at 3400 rpm	1968 to 1972	Dual carburettors
2,279 cc (139.1 cu in)	97.4 mm × 76.2 mm (3.83 in × 3.00 in)	8.5:1	100 bhp (75 kW) at 5200 rpm	139 lb⋅ft (188 N⋅m) at 3000 rpm	1972 to 1976	
2,279 cc (139.1 cu in)	97.4 mm × 76.2 mm (3.83 in × 3.00 in)	8.5:1	109 bhp (81 kW) at 5000 rpm	140 lb⋅ft (190 N⋅m) at 3000 rpm	1976 to 1978	
2,279 cc (139.1 cu in)	97.4 mm × 76.2 mm (3.83 in × 3.00 in)	8.5:1	112 bhp (84 kW) at 5400 rpm	140 lb⋅ft (190 N⋅m) at 3000 rpm	1972 to 1974	Dual carburettors
2,279 cc (139.1 cu in)	97.4 mm × 76.2 mm (3.83 in × 3.00 in)	8.5:1	116 bhp (87 kW) at 5000 rpm	145 lb⋅ft (197 N⋅m) at 3000 rpm	1974 to 1978	Dual carburettors
2,279 cc (139.1 cu in)	97.4 mm × 76.2 mm (3.83 in × 3.00 in)	9.2:1	131 bhp (98 kW) at 5500 rpm	145.5 lb⋅ft (197.3 N⋅m) at 3500 rpm	1974 to 1975	Dual carburettors, HPF
2,279 cc (139.1 cu in)	97.4 mm × 76.2 mm (3.83 in × 3.00 in)	8.5:1	135 bhp (101 kW) at 5500 rpm	134 lb⋅ft (182 N⋅m) at 4500 rpm	1978 to 1982	Dual carburettors, 16-valve head, HS/HSR

== Lotus 900 series engines ==
It is said that when Vauxhall unveiled its new slant-four engine at the 1966 Earls Court Motor Show its bore centers were exactly the same as those proposed by Lotus for their new all-alloy engine. Lotus boss Colin Chapman immediately negotiated a deal with Vauxhall to buy some of their cast-iron blocks so that development of Lotus’ own aluminum 907 engine could be sped up. For racing the hybrid engines were called LV220 and LV240, with LV standing for Lotus/Vauxhall and the numbers standing for the reported horsepower developed by each version. Lotus tested the production intent hybrid engine in a Vauxhall Victor and a Vauxhall Viva GT (registration number RAH 713F), as well as in a converted Bedford CF van.

The Lotus 900 series engine block was cast in aluminium alloy instead of iron, which made it considerably lighter than the Slant-4. The Lotus engine also used a cylinder head of light alloy that featured double overhead camshafts and four valves per cylinder. With a few modifications the Lotus head could be fitted to the Vauxhall block. Engines with Lotus heads were used in Vauxhall's dealer team race and rally programmes until the late 1970s.

== Vauxhall 16-valve engines ==
After experimenting with an 8-valve twin cam cylinder head, Vauxhall began development of a 16-valve, twin cam head for the Slant-4 in the early 1970s. The first test engine, 'Old Number 1', was running by 1973. The cylinder head was similar to the Lotus head in principle, but different in detail; in particular the cam carriers on the Vauxhall engine were angled upwards so that the covers were both horizontal (those on the Lotus engine were equal about the cylinder centreline).

The 16-valve was announced for use in the Chevette 2300 HS, which was immediately homologated for racing by the RAC MSA. Vauxhall's own 16-valve head had passed beyond the design stage, but initially was in such short supply that the rally team continued to use the Lotus heads. To address the production shortfall Vauxhall approached Cosworth and had them produce the 400 cylinder heads needed for the racing homologation requirements. When the new Vauxhall heads appeared in the Chevette 2300 HST the other teams complained, which led to a homologation scandal. This in turn led to the cars being prevented from starting the 1978 Rally of Portugal. As a result, all cars competing in international rallies were forced to use the Vauxhall head.

== Motorsports ==
Lotus raced the hybrid LV engine in two Lotus 62s for a single season.

While Vauxhall's General Motors parent company had a "no racing" policy, the Slant-4 was campaigned in various cars by the independent Dealer Team Vauxhall (DTV) organization. Development of the cars was handled by different groups, including Bill Blydenstein Racing, who ran the rally team and both raced the Lotus-head cars and improved the Vauxhall head to a point where it performed better than the Lotus head. Chris Coburn's Coburn Improvements also raced under the DTV banner.
