= Panoz =

American sports car manufacturer

Panoz LLC
- Type: Corporation
- Industry: Automotive
- Predecessor: Thompson Motor Company (Assets)
- Founded: 1989; 37 years ago (as Panoz Auto Development)
- Founder: Dan Panoz
- Headquarters: 1089 Hwy. 124 Hoschton, Georgia 30548 U.S.
- Key people: Dan Panoz; John Leverett; John Leverett Jr
- Products: Limited-production luxury cars
- Website: www.panoz.com

Panoz is an American manufacturer of luxury sports automobiles founded in 1989 as Panoz Auto Development by Dan Panoz, son of Don Panoz (1935 – 2018). The company has also been extensively involved in professional racing, and designs, engineers and builds its own race cars (including chassis and components). Panoz products have included the Panoz Roadster and AIV Roadster, the Panoz Esperante, and the Panoz Avezzano and the Panoz Abruzzi.

== Panoz and racing ==
Since 1997, Panoz cars have competed in racing series around the world. Team Panoz Racing race the Panoz Avezzano in the Pirelli GTS class, and in 2018 won the Manufacturer's Championship. In addition to Le Mans series (Now European Le Mans series) wins, an Esperante GTLM won the GT2 class at the 2006 24 Hours of Le Mans and in the same year, won the 2006 12 Hours of Sebring and was on the podium at the endurance season finale, 2006 Petit Le Mans. For the 2007 American Le Mans season, Panoz contracted longtime BMW Motorsport partner Prototype Technology Group to campaign the GTLM in the ALMS and Le Mans. Panoz has also provided IndyCar with the G-Force GF05 and GF09; and the Champ Car World Series with their final race car, the Panoz DP01 which was the final chassis used under Champ Car until the unification of the American open wheel racing series.

== Road cars ==
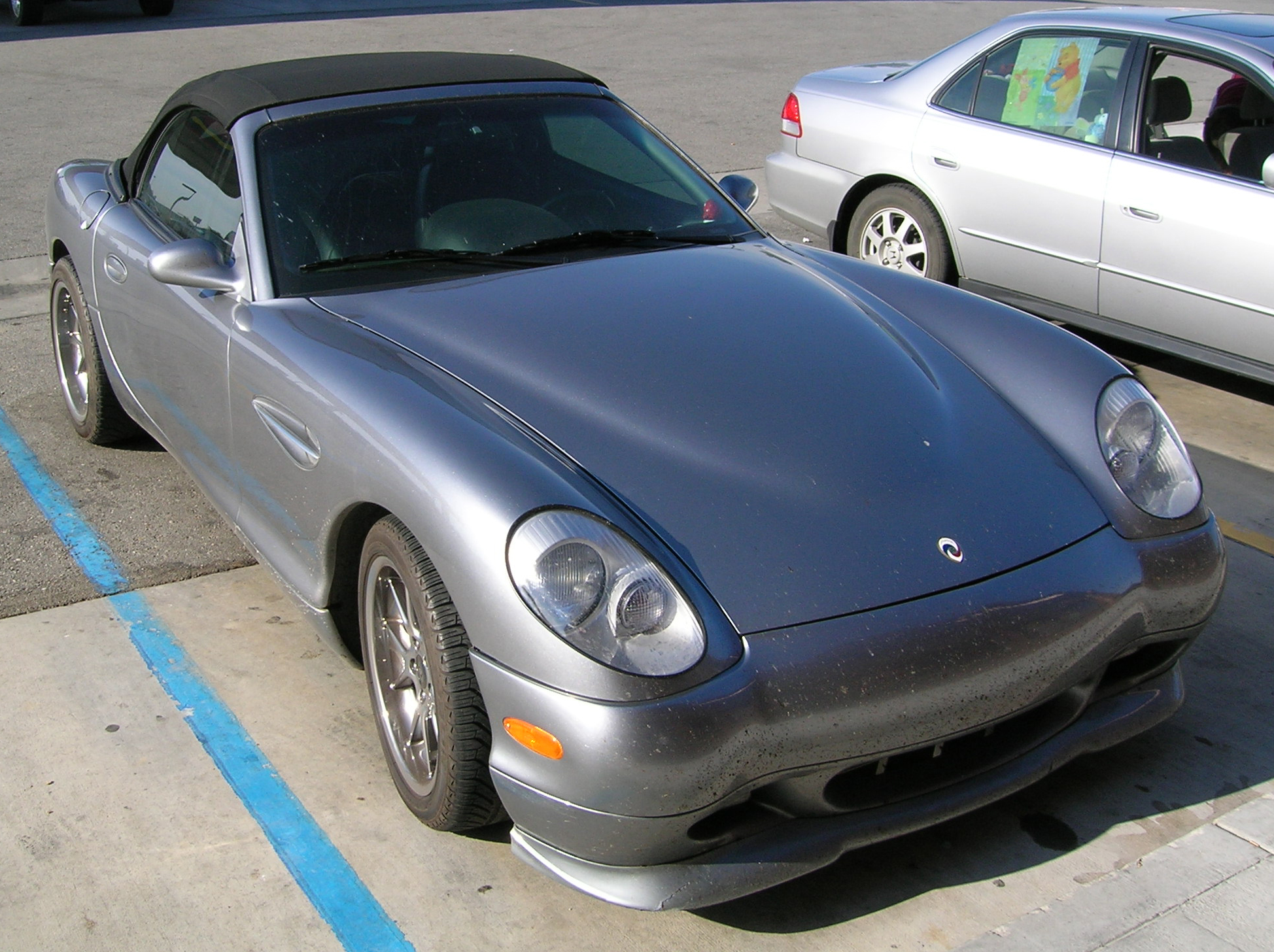
A gray colored 2-door Panoz Esperante convertible roadster

- Panoz (AIV) roadster
- Panoz Esperante
- Panoz Esperante GT
- Panoz Esperante GTLM
- Panoz Esperante JRD (tuned By JRD)
- Panoz Abruzzi
- Panoz Avezzano

== Race cars ==
Year	Car	Category
1997	Panoz Esperante GTR-1	Group GT1
1999	Panoz LMP-1 Roadster-S	LMP900
2000	G-Force GF05	IndyCar
2001	Panoz LMP07	LMP900
2002	Panoz LMP01 Evo	LMP900
2003	G-Force GF09	IndyCar
2003	Panoz Esperante GT-LM	GT2
2004	G-Force GF09B	IndyCar
2005	Panoz GF09C	IndyCar
2007	Panoz DP01	Champ Car
2008	Panoz DP09	Superleague Formula
2011	Panoz Abruzzi	LM GTE
2017	Panoz Avezzano GT4	SRO GT4

== Racing record ==
=== 24 Hours of Le Mans ===
Year	Entrant	No.	Car	Drivers	Class	Laps	Pos.	Class Pos.
1997	(France) DAMS	52	Panoz Esperante GTR-1	(France) Éric Bernard (France) Jean-Christophe Boullion (France) Franck Lagorce	LMGT1	149	DNF	DNF
1997	(United Kingdom) David Price Racing	54	Panoz Esperante GTR-1	(United States) Butch Leitzinger (United Kingdom) Andy Wallace (United Kingdom) James Weaver	LMGT1	236	DNF	DNF
1997	(United Kingdom) David Price Racing	55	Panoz Esperante GTR-1	(Australia) David Brabham (United States) Harry "Doc" Bundy (United Kingdom) Perry McCarthy	LMGT1	145	DNF	DNF
1998	(France) DAMS (United States) Panoz Motorsports	44	Panoz Esperante GTR-1	(France) Éric Bernard (United States) Johnny O'Connell (France) Christophe Tinseau	LMGT1	236	DNF	DNF
1998	(United States) Panoz Motorsports	45	Panoz Esperante GTR-1	(Australia) David Brabham (United Kingdom) Jamie Davies (United Kingdom) Andy Wallace	LMGT1	335	7th	7th
1999	(United States) Panoz Motorsports	11	Panoz LMP-1 Roadster-S	(Italy) Max Angelelli (Denmark) Jan Magnussen (United States) Johnny O'Connell	LMP900	324	11th	9th
1999	(United States) Panoz Motorsports	12	Panoz LMP-1 Roadster-S	(France) Éric Bernard (Australia) David Brabham (United States) Butch Leitzinger	LMP900	337	7th	6th
2000	(United States) Panoz Motorsports	11	Panoz LMP-1 Roadster-S	(United States) Mario Andretti (Australia) David Brabham (Denmark) Jan Magnussen	LMP900	315	15th	8th
2000	(United States) Panoz Motorsports	12	Panoz LMP-1 Roadster-S	(Japan) Hiroki Katoh (United States) Johnny O'Connell (France) Pierre-Henri Raphanel	LMP900	342	5th	5th
2001	(United States) Panoz Motor Sports	11	Panoz LMP07	(United Kingdom) Jamie Davies (South Africa) Gary Formato (Germany) Klaus Graf	LMP900	86	DNF	DNF
2001	(United States) Panoz Motor Sports	12	Panoz LMP07	(Australia) David Brabham (France) Franck Lagorce (Denmark) Jan Magnussen	LMP900	85	DNF	DNF
2002	(United States) Panoz Motor Sports	11	Panoz LMP01 Evo	(Australia) David Brabham (United States) Bryan Herta (Denmark) Jan Magnussen	LMP900	90	DNF	DNF
2002	(United States) Panoz Motor Sports	12	Panoz LMP01 Evo	(United States) Bill Auberlen (United States) David Donohue (United States) Gunnar Jeannette	LMP900	230	DNF	DNF
2003	(United States) JML Team Panoz	11	Panoz LMP01 Evo	(Monaco) Olivier Beretta (United States) Gunnar Jeannette (Italy) Max Papis	LMP900	360	5th	3rd
2003	(United States) JML Team Panoz	12	Panoz LMP01 Evo	(Switzerland) Benjamin Leuenberger (Canada) Scott Maxwell (Belgium) David Saelens	LMP900	233	DNF	DNF
2004	(United States) Panoz Motor Sports (France) Larbre Compétition	11	Panoz GTP	(France) Roland Bervillé (France) Jean-Luc Blanchemain (France) Patrick Bourdais	LMP1	54	DNF	DNF
2005	(United States) Panoz Motor Sports	77	Panoz Esperante GT-LM	(United States) Bill Auberlen (United Kingdom) Robin Liddell (Canada) Scott Maxwell	LMGT2	27	DNF	DNF
2005	(United States) Panoz Motor Sports	78	Panoz Esperante GT-LM	(France) Patrick Bourdais (United Kingdom) Marino Franchitti (United States) Bryan Sellers	LMGT2	185	DNF	DNF
2006	(Canada) Multimatic Motorsport Team Panoz	77	Panoz Esperante GT-LM	(United States) Gunnar Jeannette (Canada) Scott Maxwell (United States) Tommy Milner	LMGT2	34	DNF	DNF
2006	(United Kingdom) Team LNT	81	Panoz Esperante GT-LM	(United Kingdom) Richard Dean (United Kingdom) Tom Kimber-Smith (United Kingdom) Lawrence Tomlinson	LMGT2	321	15th	1st
2006	(United Kingdom) Team LNT	81	Panoz Esperante GT-LM	(United Kingdom) Tom Kimber-Smith (United States) Tommy Milner (United Kingdom) Danny Watts	LMGT2	60	DNF	DNF
2006	(United Kingdom) Team LNT	82	Panoz Esperante GT-LM	(United Kingdom) Rob Bell (United Kingdom) Richard Dean (United Kingdom) Lawrence Tomlinson	LMGT2	308	23rd	5th

== Panoz Motor Sports Group ==
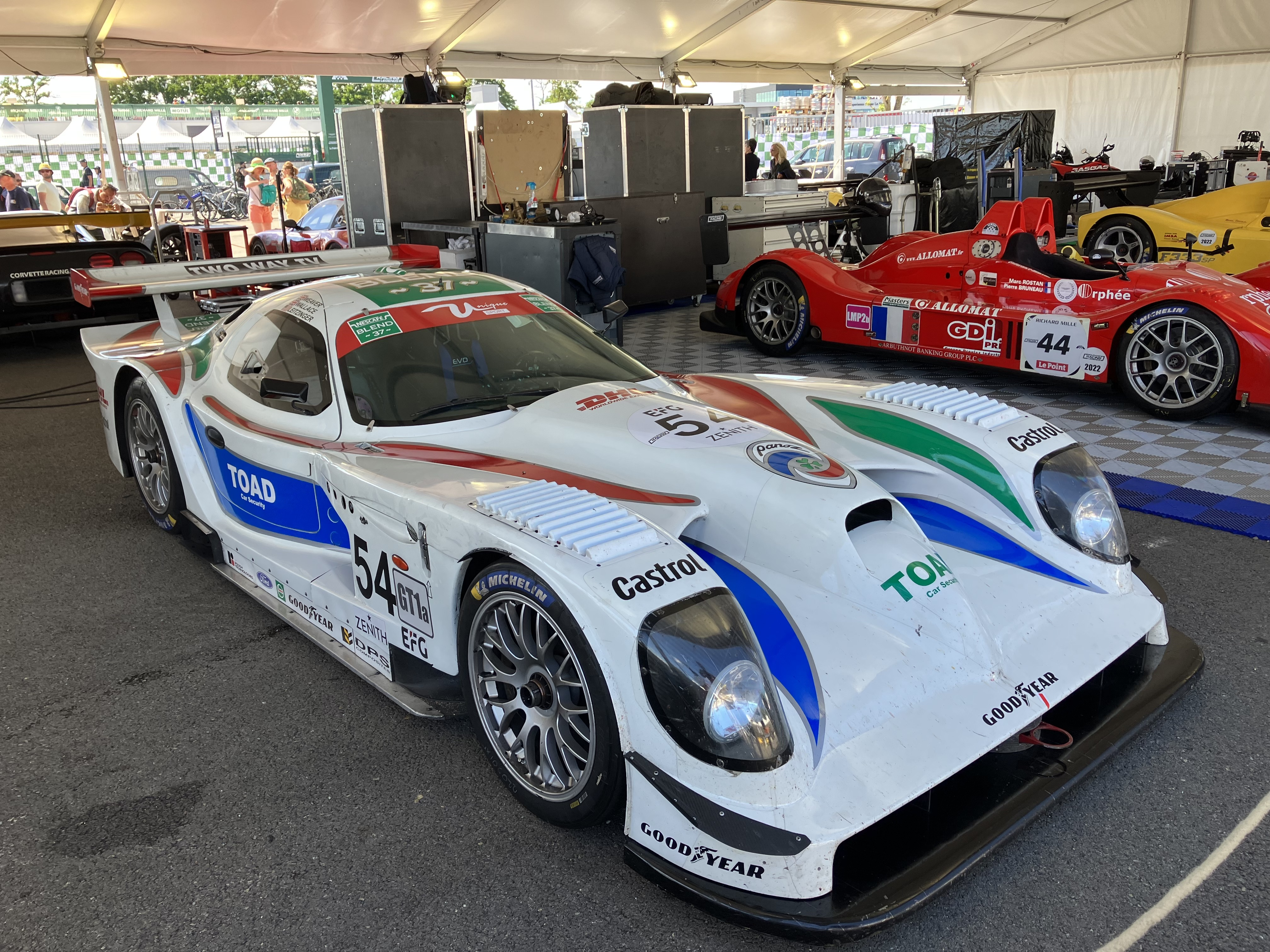
Panoz Esperante GTR-1 in the paddock of the 2022 Le Mans Classic.

Panoz Motor Sports Group was sold to NASCAR in 2012. The assets of the sale included the American Le Mans Series, Road Atlanta, Sebring International Raceway and Panoz Racing Schools. Mosport International Raceway was sold separately to a Canadian consortium led by Ron Fellows and Carlo Fidani.

Panoz, LLC., is an automotive manufacturer that builds and designs street cars and race cars. Élan Motorsports is a company that builds and designs race cars too. Both these two companies are still owned by the Panoz family.

=== American Le Mans Series ===
The American Le Mans Series (ALMS) was created by Don Panoz in 1999. Panoz also owned the International Motor Sports Association, the organization that sanctions the ALMS. It held its inaugural event, the 1998 Petit Le Mans as part of the Professional Sportscar Racing series. The ALMS has a partnership with the Automobile Club de l'Ouest, the organizers of the 24 Hours of Le Mans, to allow teams to compete to the same regulations. In 2012, the ALMS was sold to NASCAR and then in 2014, the series merged with the Rolex Sports Car Series to form United SportsCar Racing.

=== Circuits ===
The Panoz group previously owned Road Atlanta in Braselton, Georgia, United States as well as previously operated Sebring International Raceway in Sebring, Florida, United States. They also previously owned Mosport International Raceway in Bowmanville, Ontario, Canada but was sold in 2011. The tracks hosted the American Le Mans Series, now the IMSA WeatherTech SportsCar Championship, in addition to other top-level auto and motorcycle racing series.

=== Élan Motorsport Technologies ===
Élan Motorsports is a company that designs and builds race cars, from top-level professional racing cars through to amateur race cars. The company is owned by the Panoz family. Élan acquired other manufacturers, including famous Formula Ford builders Van Diemen and Indy Racing League constructor G-Force Technologies. Élan-built cars have raced in the Indy Racing League, Champ Car World Series, American Le Mans Series, Le Mans Series, and other championships.

=== Panoz Racing School and series ===
The Panoz Racing School was a driver training school previously operated at Road Atlanta, Sebring International Raceway, and Texas Motor Speedway. Students learned racing techniques in purpose-built Panoz GT-RA cars. Following completion of the course, students were eligible for an SCCA regional racing license. The school also included programs where customers could receive instruction in their own road cars.

The Panoz Racing Series was a one-make series made up of the Panoz School cars, as well as the more powerful Panoz GTS models. The series was designed for amateurs to learn racing in a low-cost environment.
