= Vauxhall XVR =

Concept car developed by Vauxhall

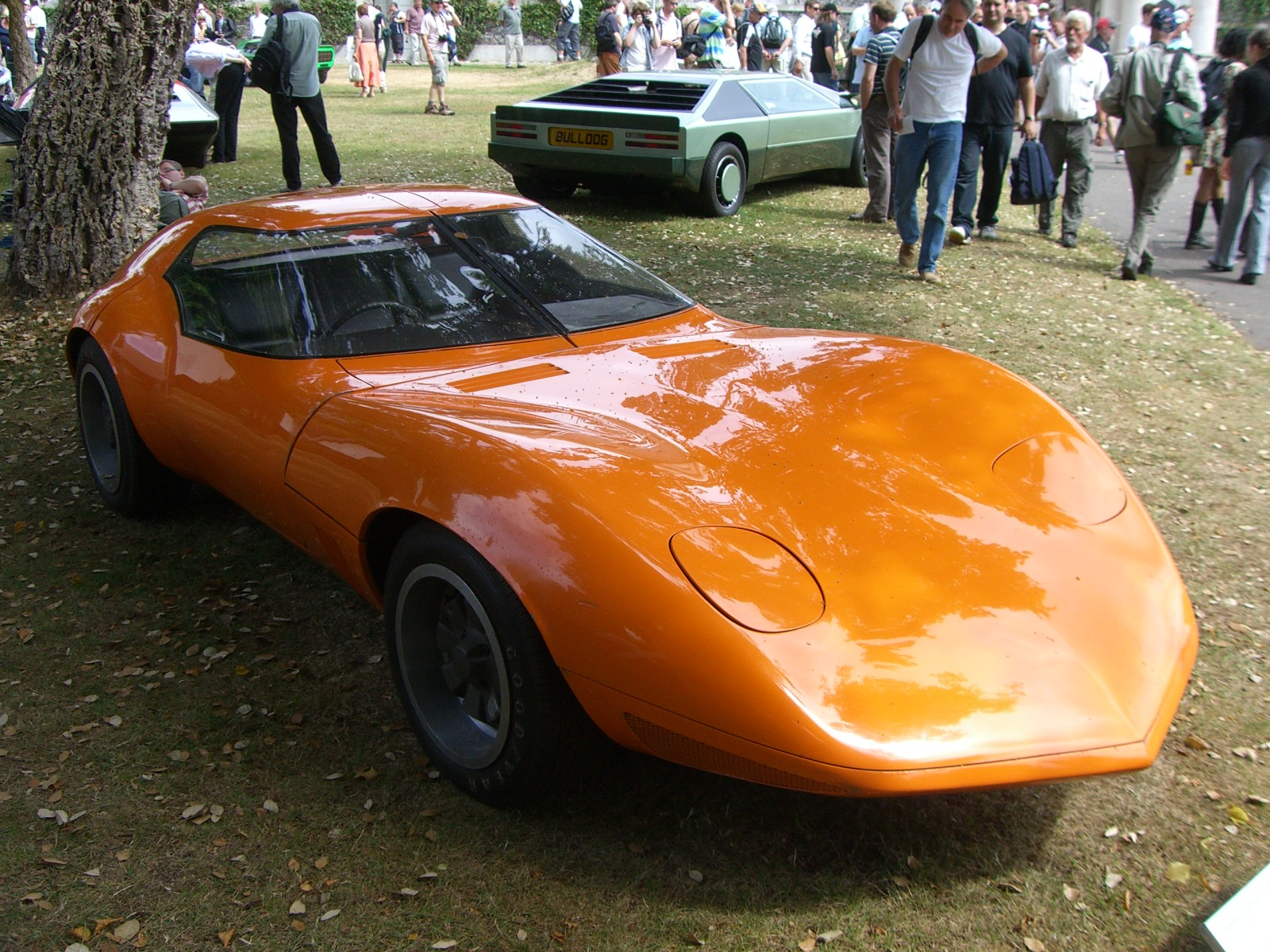
- The surviving Vauxhall XVR mockup

Overview
- Manufacturer: Vauxhall
- Production: 1966 (three built)
- Designer: David Jones (design director)

Body and chassis
- Class: Concept car
- Layout: FMR Layout
- Doors: Gullwing doors

Powertrain
- Engine: 2.0 L (1,975 cc) Slant-four I4
- Transmission: 4-speed manual

The Vauxhall XVR is a concept car built in 1966 by Vauxhall. The name stands for eXperimental Vauxhall Research. It debuted at the March 1966 Geneva Motor Show, receiving favourable reviews from the press, but never went into production.

== Production ==
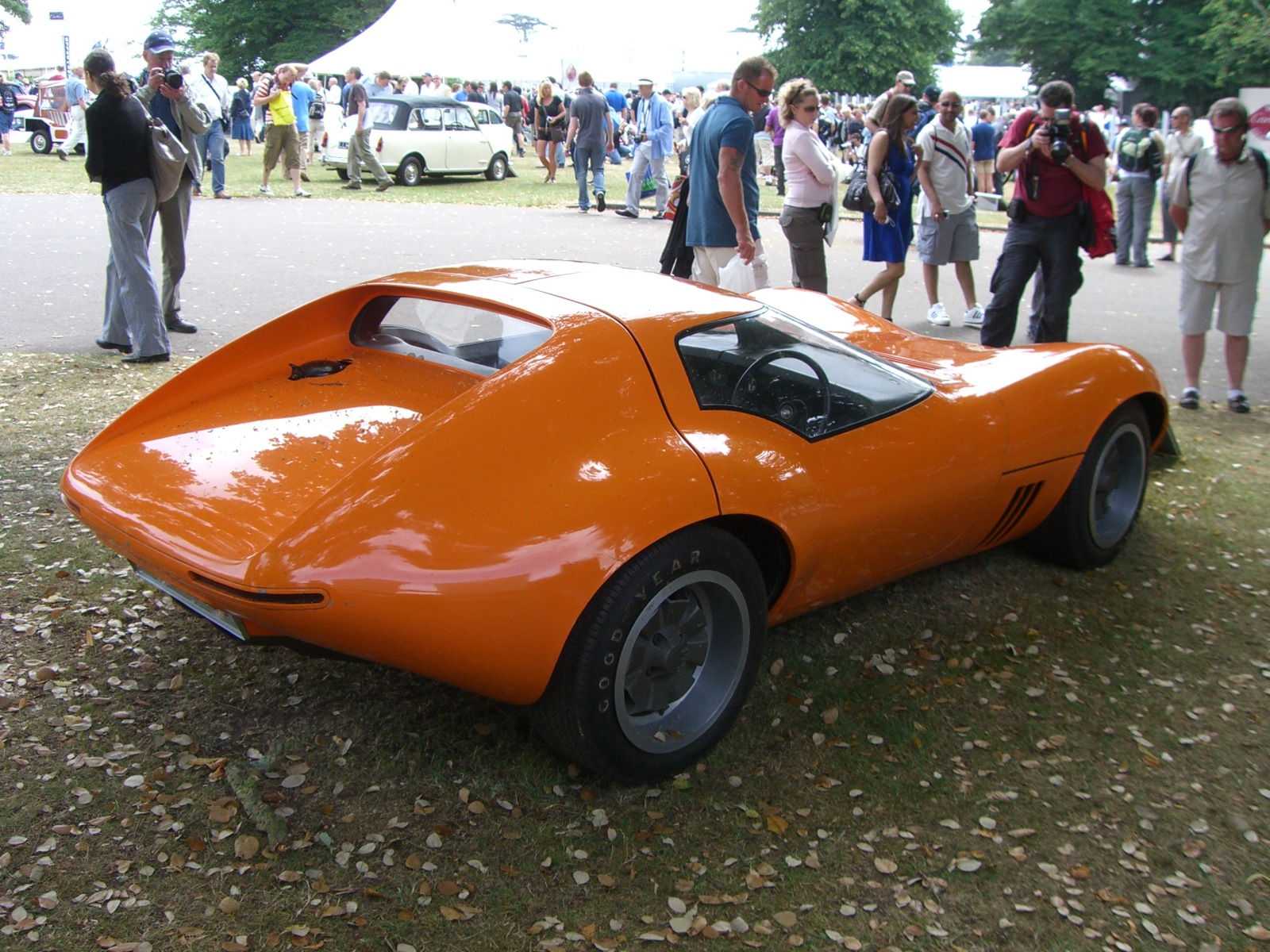
XVR (rear end)

Three prototypes of the XVR were built in total. Two were glassfibre rolling mockups with no engines, while one was a metal bodied, fully functional example, built by Motor Panels of Coventry. The fully functional car was the one displayed at the Geneva Motor Show in March 1966. In total, the concept took five months to design and build.

Only one of the mockups survives today. The running prototype was damaged while on display in Canada and was scrapped; Vauxhall also crushed the other mockup. The surviving car remains in the ownership of Vauxhall Motors and is currently on display at the British Motor Museum.

== Specifications ==
The lone fully functional XVR was powered by a few different front mid-mounted engines during its existence. As the intended fitment was still undergoing testing, the XVR was fitted with a used 1.5-litre four, cleaned up and repainted, for the Geneva Motor Show. Once the 2.3-litre slant-four was ready, a tuned pre-production example of the variant model which was later used in the Vauxhall VX4/90 was installed. Upper management then decreed that development work be halted and had a 2.0-litre slant-four in standard trim replaced the car as it entered the show circuit. This engine produces around 100 bhp (75 kW).

The suspension was fully independent in the front and rear, and there were disc brakes at all four corners. With the 2-litre engine, the XVR was able to reach a top speed of over 100 mph (160 km/h).

== Design ==
The design team for the XVR was directed by David Jones and included Wayne Cherry, John Taylor, Leo Pruneau, and Judd Holcombe. The styling was inspired by the 1965 Mako Shark II concept car by Chevrolet. Notable design features include a split windscreen, pop up headlamps, and gull wing doors that are hinged at the center of the car, with the windscreen mounted to them.
