= Frank Costin =

British automotive engineer (1920–1995)

- Born: Francis Albert Costin; 8 June 1920; Hammersmith, London
- Died: 5 February 1995 (aged 74); Kettering, Northamptonshire

Francis Albert Costin (8 June 1920 – 5 February 1995) was a British automotive engineer who advanced monocoque chassis design and was instrumental in adapting aircraft aerodynamic knowledge for automobile use.

== Career ==
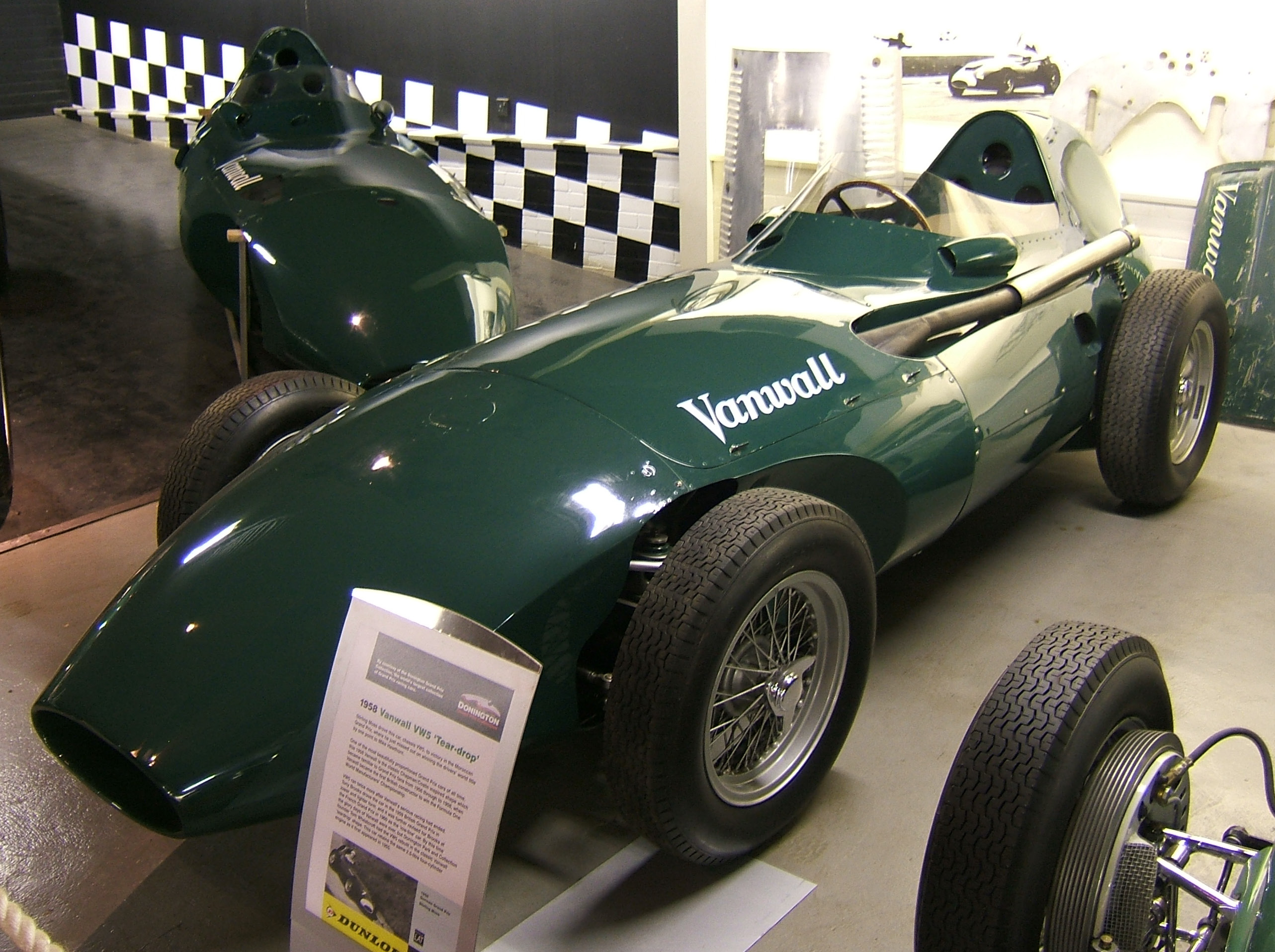
Vanwall VW5 World Champion F1 Constructor 1958 "the classic Costin-inspired shape"

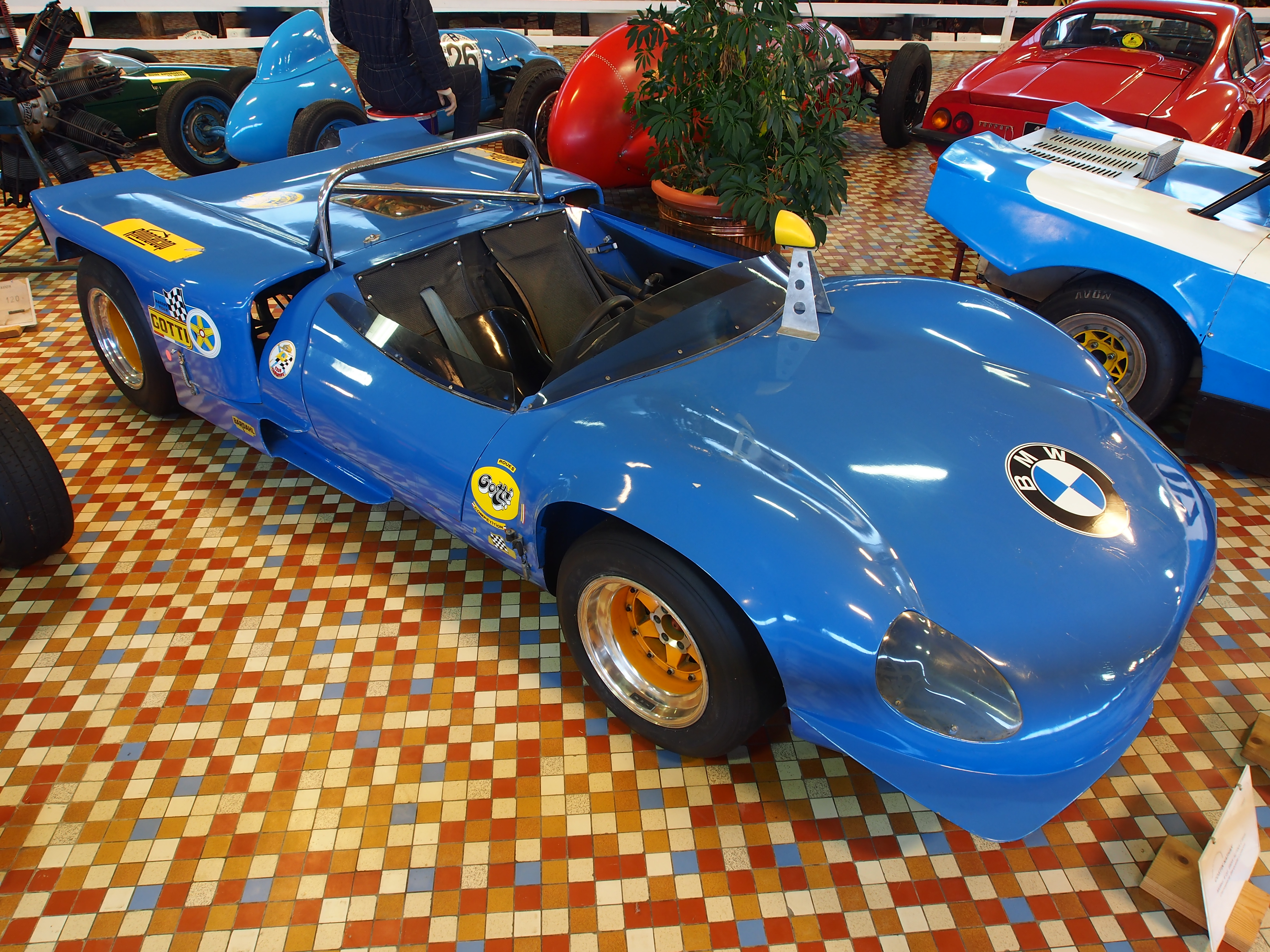
1968 Costin Nathan

Costin was an engineer with the de Havilland Aircraft Company when, in 1954, his brother Mike, a former de Havilland engineer then working for Lotus Engineering Ltd., asked him to design an aerodynamic body for a new racing car. Intrigued by the idea of applying aerodynamics to racing cars, Costin designed the body for the Lotus Mark VIII. Unlike his brother, Costin was never a Lotus employee; his work there was either as a paid consultant or as a volunteer.

In 1956, when Chapman was commissioned by Tony Vandervell to design a Grand Prix racing car to challenge Maserati and Ferrari's dominance of the formula, Chapman recommended Costin to Vandervell as the body designer. Costin designed the body for the Vanwall that won the first Grand Prix Constructors' Championship.

Later, Costin used his aeronautical knowledge to design and build a chassis from plywood. This led to a lightweight, stiff structure, which he could then clothe with an efficient, aerodynamic body, a huge advantage in the low-capacity sports car racing of the immediate postwar period. He was also involved in a number of road car projects for various manufacturers including Lister and Lotus, where he contributed to the early aerodynamic designs; Marcos, which he co-founded with Speedex Cars' Jem Marsh (MARsh and COStin); and racecar chassis for Maserati, Lotus, and DTV. He also designed the Costin Amigo, the TMC Costin, and the Costin Sports Roadster. He also created an ultra-light glider with Keith Duckworth, an old friend and his brother's business partner.

== Personal life ==
In his youth, Costin had been an Olympic-standard swimmer, while in his later years he composed music.
