= TMC Costin =

Overview
- Manufacturer: Thompson Manufacturing Company
- Production: 1983–1987
- Assembly: Castlebridge, County Wexford, Ireland
- Designer: Frank Costin

Body and chassis
- Class: Sports car
- Body style: 2 seat (or 2+2) Targa top
- Layout: F/R
- Platform: Tubular steel space frame

Powertrain
- Engine: I4
- Transmission: 4-speed manual

Dimensions
- Wheelbase: 2,390 mm (94.1 in)
- Length: 3,580 mm (140.9 in)
- Width: 1,520 mm (59.8 in)
- Height: 1,100 mm (43.3 in)
- Kerb weight: 658 kg (1,451 lb)

The TMC Costin is a Clubman-style sports car built from 1983 to 1987 in Castlebridge, County Wexford, Ireland. Fewer than forty were produced. It was an unusual design of an ungainly, cobbled together appearance, mixing the front design of a Lotus Seven with a slab-sided, shed-like structure at the rear. It was a very purposeful design, however, strictly oriented towards low aerodynamics, good high-speed stability, light weight, and structural strength.

== History ==
The Thompsons of County Wexford, Ireland were a farming family with six sons. One son, Peter Thompson, embarked on an engineering career, first as a draughtsman at agricultural engineering firm Phillip Pierce and Co. in Wexford and later with the Timoney Research Centre at Navan, where he was in charge of several projects related to the design of armoured personnel carriers. Eventually three of the brothers were at Timoney: Val Thompson was hired as a Financial controller, and Sean Thompson as a Design technician.

In March 1983 Peter, Val, and Sean, along with a fourth brother, Anthony, established a new company to build cars. While some references call it the "Thompson Motorsport Company", most refer to the business as the "Thompson Manufacturing Company" (TMC). Financial support was provided through the Industrial Development Authority, under the terms of the Small Industries Scheme. Some degree of American investment or ownership is also possible.

Peter asked engineer and aerodynamicist Frank Costin to design the company's first automobile. In addition to designing the car itself, Costin was to develop the tooling and jigs needed to build it in exchange for a 10% royalty on each car sold. This design became Costin's Auto Project XXIV. Conceptually, it was intended to be an improvement on the Lotus Seven. It was also a further development of ideas Costin had explored in his earlier Marcos Xylon. It is described as the first road racing car built in Ireland.

While under development, the car was called the Rushabout. The original engine chosen was the 1,256 cc (76.65 cu in) straight-four engine from the Vauxhall Chevette.

The Thompson brothers hand-built the first car in the family barn. They announced plans to open a 4,000 sq ft (370 m^{2}) factory with a staff of eight to build the car in July 1983.

The renamed TMC Costin was officially launched at the Mondello Park circuit in late 1983, and sales began the following year. The car was available in three states of tune: GTA, GTB, and GTC, and offered in kit form or as a fully assembled automobile. The kit was originally priced at £2000, later rising to £6000; prices for the fully built car started at £6500 for a basic model, but eventually climbed to £13,000 with Value-added tax (VAT) and duty included.

TMC had ambitious plans for sales to Canada. Automotive News reported that by late 1985 the company had exported five cars to the country with plans to reach annual sales of fifty cars per year in that market, where the car sold for CDN$20,000.

A planned restyling of the car by Richard Oakes, designer of the Nova/Sterling kit car, did not happen.

Production of the TMC Costin ran from 1983 to 1987. Although TMC claimed to have built close to one hundred cars, the total number of cars produced is typically reported to have been either twenty-six or thirty-nine units.

In 1988 TMC sold the rights to the chassis to Daniel (Dan) Panoz, son of Don Panoz, an American businessman who owned a pharmaceutical firm based in Ireland. The younger Panoz had applied for a job at TMC. Some references say that he briefly worked for TMC, while others say that the company went out of business before he could start. With financial backing from his father, Dan Panoz acquired the plans and jigs for the chassis, as well as parts for two complete cars, which were shipped to the United States. He also hired TMC engineers Sean Thompson and Mick Murphy. Panoz established Panoz Auto Development (PAD), and used the TMC Costin's chassis design as the basis of the Panoz Roadster"

== Features ==
Production versions of the TMC Costin use Ford engines or derivatives. The base engine was a 1,599 cc (97.6 cu in) Ford Crossflow. A version with the Ford CVH engine was also offered. For even more power the car could be fitted with Cosworth BDA or BDR engines. Power outputs are 84, 110, or 130 hp (63, 82, or 97 kW). Competition versions were also available; in 1984 the Costin 1600 RSR received a tuned version of the Escort XR3's CVH engine, fitted with twin Weber 40 carburettors and the Sierra's five-speed transmission. The cheaper 1600 RS used the crossflow engine, a four-speed manual, and had to make do with fabric, rather than solid, doors.

The space frame chassis was designed by Costin. It is noteworthy for being a union of three modules or cells: a front frame to which the engine and suspension are bolted, a triangular centre section for the driver and passenger, and a rear section to support the rear suspension and roll bar. The structure was particularly effective at increasing stiffness in the cockpit/passenger area. The chassis was designed for an engine output in the vicinity of 300 hp (224 kW). With a 100% design safety margin, the structure is theoretically capable of managing up to 600 hp (447.4 kW).

The front windscreen is a bespoke item made by Pilkington exclusively for TMC. The car's doors are hinged on the A pillars and pivot up and forward when opened. The large triangular B-pillar and roof hoop enclose the rollbar, and the roof is a Targa top with a removable centre section. A glass rear hatch cover was standard. Unusually for cars of this class, there is 16.5 cu ft (467 L) of luggage space behind the driver and passenger, which can also accommodate two rear-facing seats. The bodywork is made of glass-reinforced plastic (GRP), aluminium, and Kevlar panels.

The front suspension consists of adjustable equal-length upper and lower wishbones, coil springs and telescopic dampers. The rear suspension locates a live rear axle and comprises double radius arms and a Panhard rod. The axle is an Atlas unit from a Ford Capri. Front brakes are Girling discs, while the rear brakes are drums.

== Technical data ==
TMC Costin 1600
	Detail:
Engine:	Front-mounted Ford Crossflow inline four engine
Bore × Stroke:	81.0 mm × 77.6 mm (3.19 in × 3.06 in)
Displacement:	1,599 cc (97.6 cu in)
Maximum power:	82 hp (61 kW) at 5500 rpm
Maximum torque:	91 ft⋅lb (123 N⋅m) at 2800 rpm
Compression ratio:	9.0:1
Valvetrain:	Single cam-in-block, pushrods, rocker arms, two overhead valves per cylinder.
Induction:	Naturally aspirated, single Weber DATR carburettor
Cooling:	Water
Transmission:	4-speed manual
Steering:	Rack and pinion
Brakes f/r:	Disc/drum
Suspension front:	Upper and lower wishbones, coil springs, telescopic dampers
Suspension rear:	Live axle, parallel radius arms, Panhard rod.
Body/Chassis:	Glass reinforced plastic (GRP) and Kevlar body, tubular steel space frame chassis
Track f/r:	1,400 / 1,400 mm (55.1 / 55.1 in)
Weight distribution f/r:	50% / 50%
Wheelbase:	2,390 mm (94.1 in)
Final drive ratio:	3.75:1
Tires f/r:	185/50 HR 13 / 185/50 HR 13
Length; Width; Height:	3,580 mm (140.9 in); 1,520 mm (59.8 in); 1,100 mm (43.3 in)
Weight:	658 kg (1,450.6 lb)

== Motorsports ==
The TMC Costin is credited with some notable racing success. It took pole position in its debut race at Mondello Park in 1983. This prompted Peter Thompson to ask "What is 'pole'?". Driven by John Keaney, the car won on its first outing.

Val Thompson has personally raced a TMC Costin in vintage events.
