= Vauxhall Chevette =

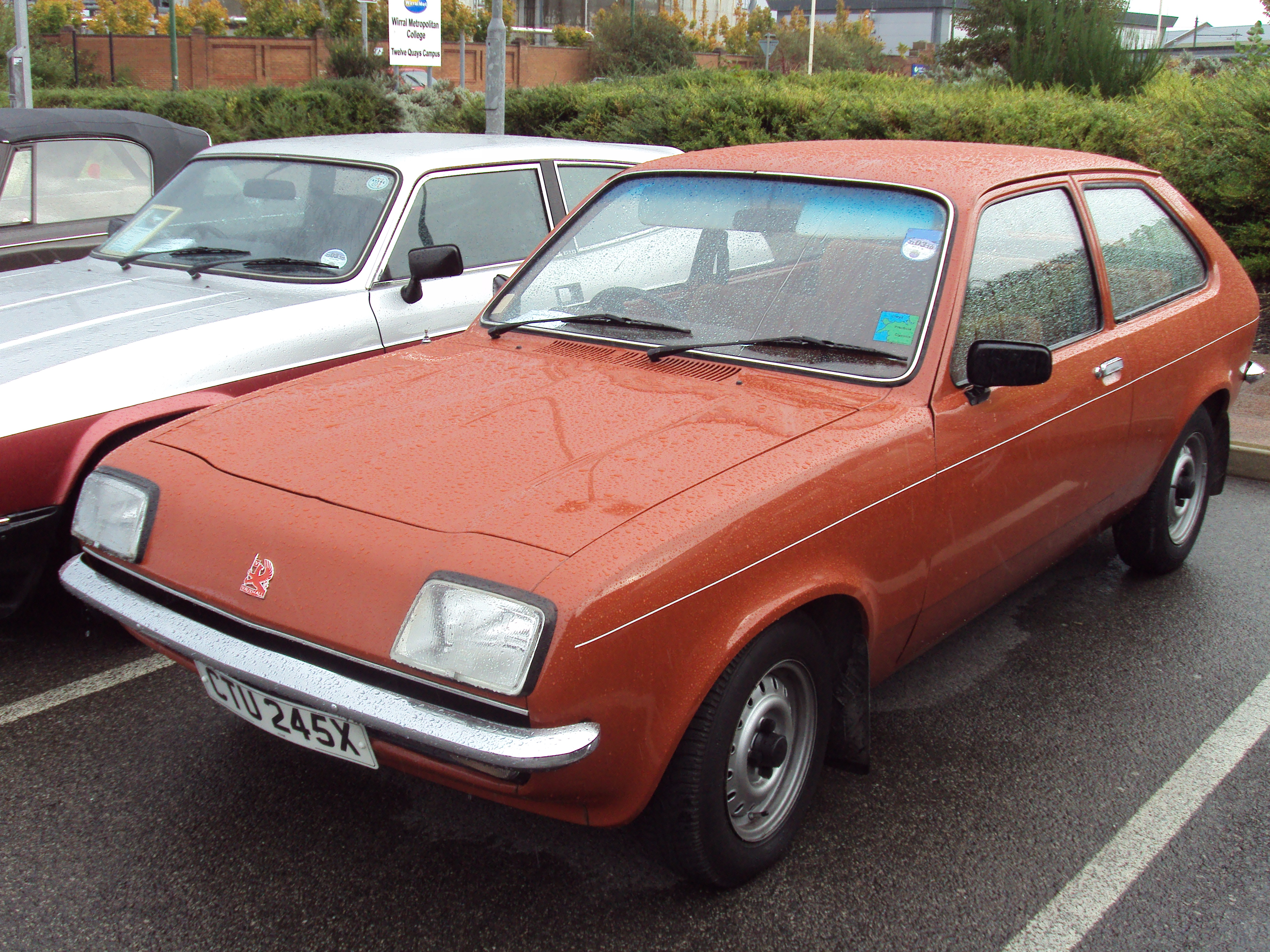

Overview
- Manufacturer: Vauxhall (General Motors)
- Also called: Bedford Chevanne; AYMESA Cóndor (saloon); AYMESA Gala (hatchback)
- Production: 1975–1984
- Assembly: United Kingdom: Bedfordshire, Luton; United Kingdom: Cheshire, Ellesmere Port; New Zealand: Trentham (General Motors New Zealand); Ecuador: Quito (AYMESA)

Body and chassis
- Class: Supermini/Compact car (B/C)
- Body style: 2/4-door saloon; 3-door hatchback; 3-door estate; 3-door van
- Layout: FR layout
- Platform: GM T platform (RWD)
- Related: Chevrolet Chevette; GMC Chevette; Holden Gemini; Isuzu Gemini; Opel Kadett; Opel K-180; Daewoo Maepsy

Powertrain
- Engine: 1256 cc Viva OHV I4; 2279 cc Slant-4 DOHC 16V I4
- Transmission: 4-speed manual 5-speed manual; 3-speed automatic

Chronology
- Successor: Vauxhall Astra; Vauxhall Nova; Bedford Astravan (vans)

The Vauxhall Chevette is a supermini car that was manufactured by Vauxhall in the United Kingdom from 1975 to 1984. It was Vauxhall's version of the "T-Car" small-car family from Vauxhall's parent General Motors (GM), and based primarily on the Opel Kadett C. The family also included the Isuzu Gemini in Japan, the Holden Gemini in Australia, the Chevrolet Chevette in the United States, Canada, Brazil, Colombia, Ecuador and Argentina, and in the U.S. and Canada it was also rebadged as the Pontiac Acadian/Pontiac T1000.

== Development ==
The Chevette, as its name implies, was intended to be a small (baby) Chevrolet. At the same time as the Chevette project was being considered in America, Vauxhall Motors publicised a new design project, provisionally referred to as the Baby R, later designated as the S-car by GM. However, to save costs GM management shelved the S-car project and merged its styling studies with the existing T-car programme — thus the Chevette would be derived from the Opel Kadett C. The car was first launched in Brazil in 1973 as a slightly restyled Kadett with a hatchback added to the model range. This hatchback was launched in the U.S. and Britain in 1975 with restyled front ends. Initial production was at Vauxhall's Luton, Bedfordshire, factory, then Chevette assembly was moved to the Ellesmere Port plant in Cheshire to allow production of the larger Cavalier and Carlton models to be moved to Luton from Opel plants in Belgium and Germany.

The UK version of the vehicle was intended to fit into the Vauxhall range below the Viva, and was initially presented only in its hatchback version, a style that became very popular during the 1970s. With its Pontiac-inspired 'shovel nose' and inset headlamps, the UK version looked radically different from the Opel Kadett and was accepted by the motoring public as a completely new car; when the saloon, estate car, and van variants appeared and the hatchback was added to the Kadett lineup the common lineage became apparent. The Chevette was one of the first British-built hatchbacks of this size, the first arguably being the Austin A40 Countryman; Ford did not respond with a similar product until the following year (their similar-sized offerings all having conventional rear boots).

Sales began on 1 May 1975, from a price of £1,593. The Chevette was sold in direct competition with its Opel sister until the latter was superseded in 1979 by which time moves were already being made to merge both the Vauxhall and Opel ranges and marketing operations.

From 1975 until 1978 the Chevette was the UK's best-selling hatchback, as UK branded rivals failed to respond to the challenge of the imported Peugeot 104, Fiat 127, and Renault 5 until the arrival of Ford's Fiesta at the end of 1976. Chrysler UK did not launch its Chrysler Sunbeam until 1977, while only in 1980 did British Leyland come up with the Austin Metro. The Chevette also managed to outsell larger hatchbacks, including the Austin Maxi and Chrysler Alpine.

The Chevette's 1.3-litre engine and relatively small bodyshell allowed for good performance. The Chevette had light steering, clutch, and gear change, as well as good visibility, and was spacious inside. The Chevette's success was probably due to its versatility, which compared well with larger cars such as the Ford Escort. It was available in three-door hatchback for the single driver, saloon models that suited families, an estate car for the service fleets, and the Chevanne van version for utility purposes.

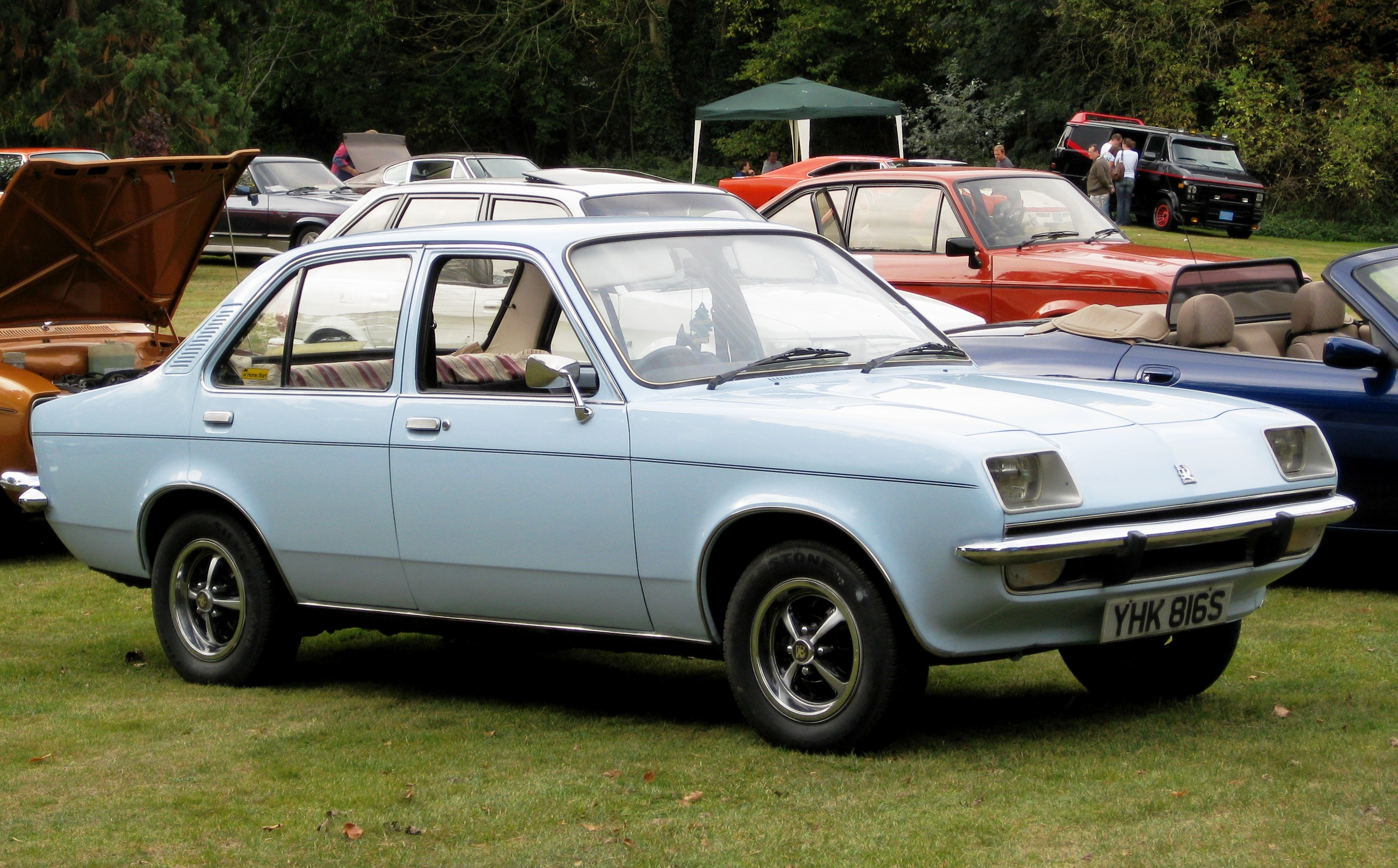
Vauxhall Chevette four-door saloon (pre-facelift with recessed headlights)

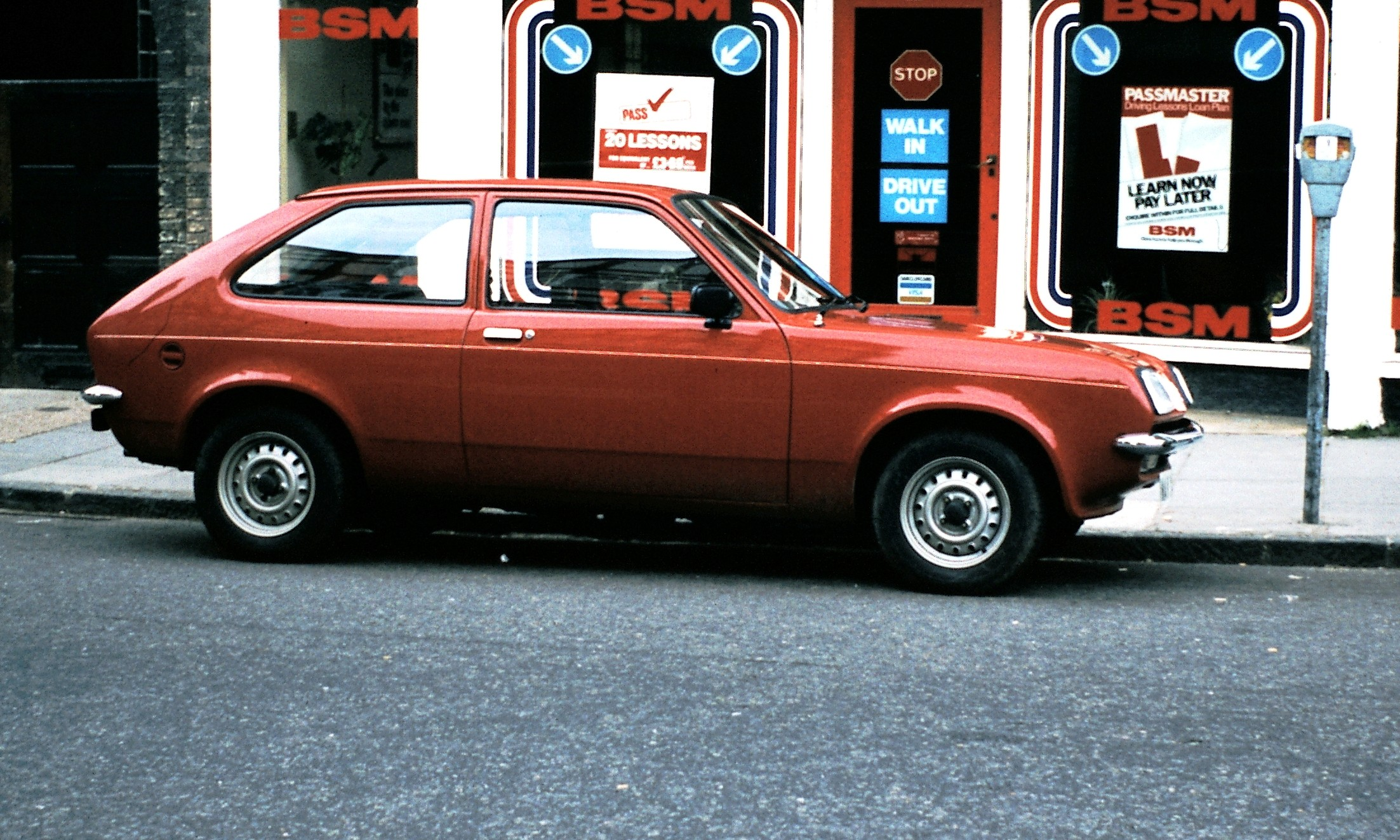
The Vauxhall Chevette hatchback

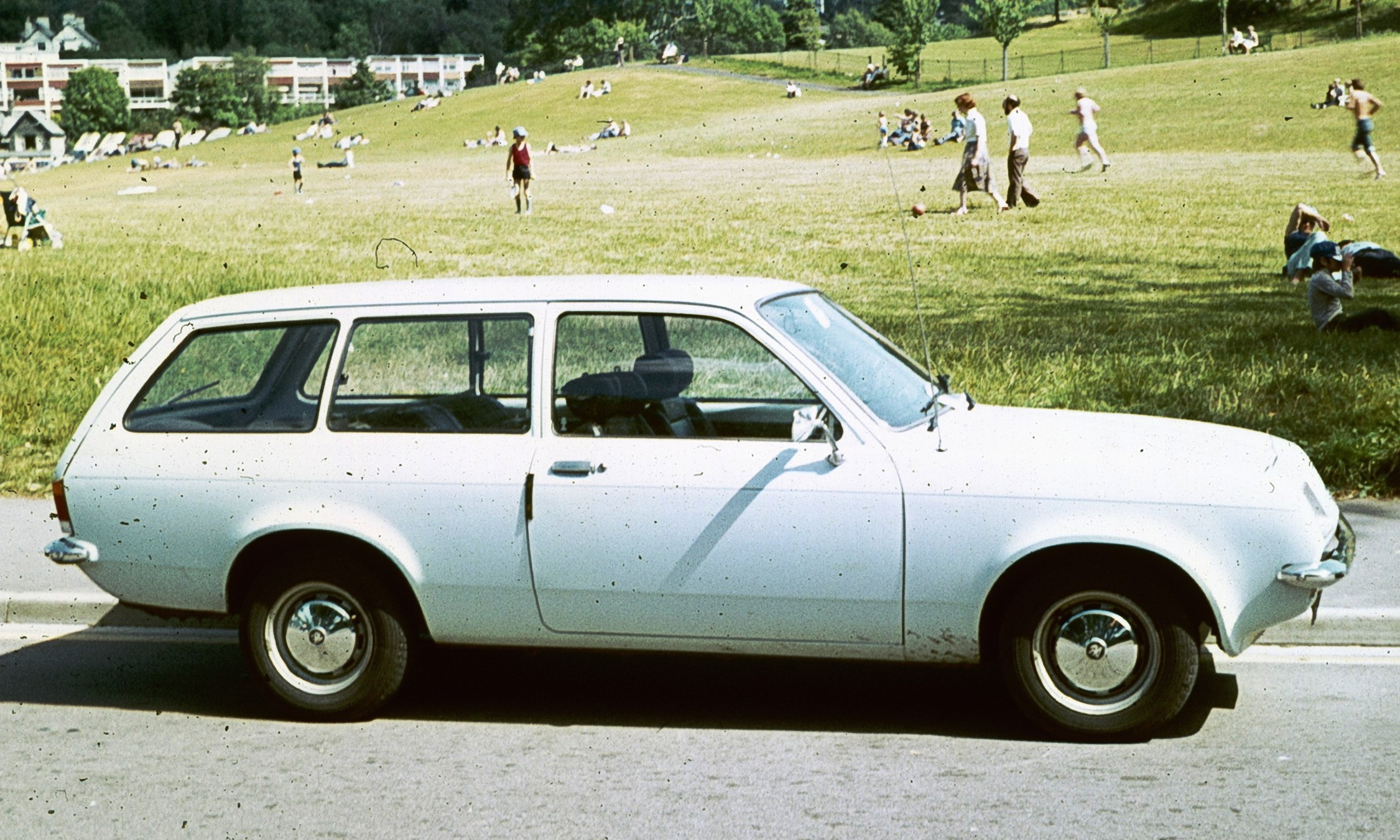
In 1976, the estate version was introduced, essentially the "Caravan" version of the Kadett C with a droopsnoot nose. The two- and four-door saloon versions also appeared at the same time.

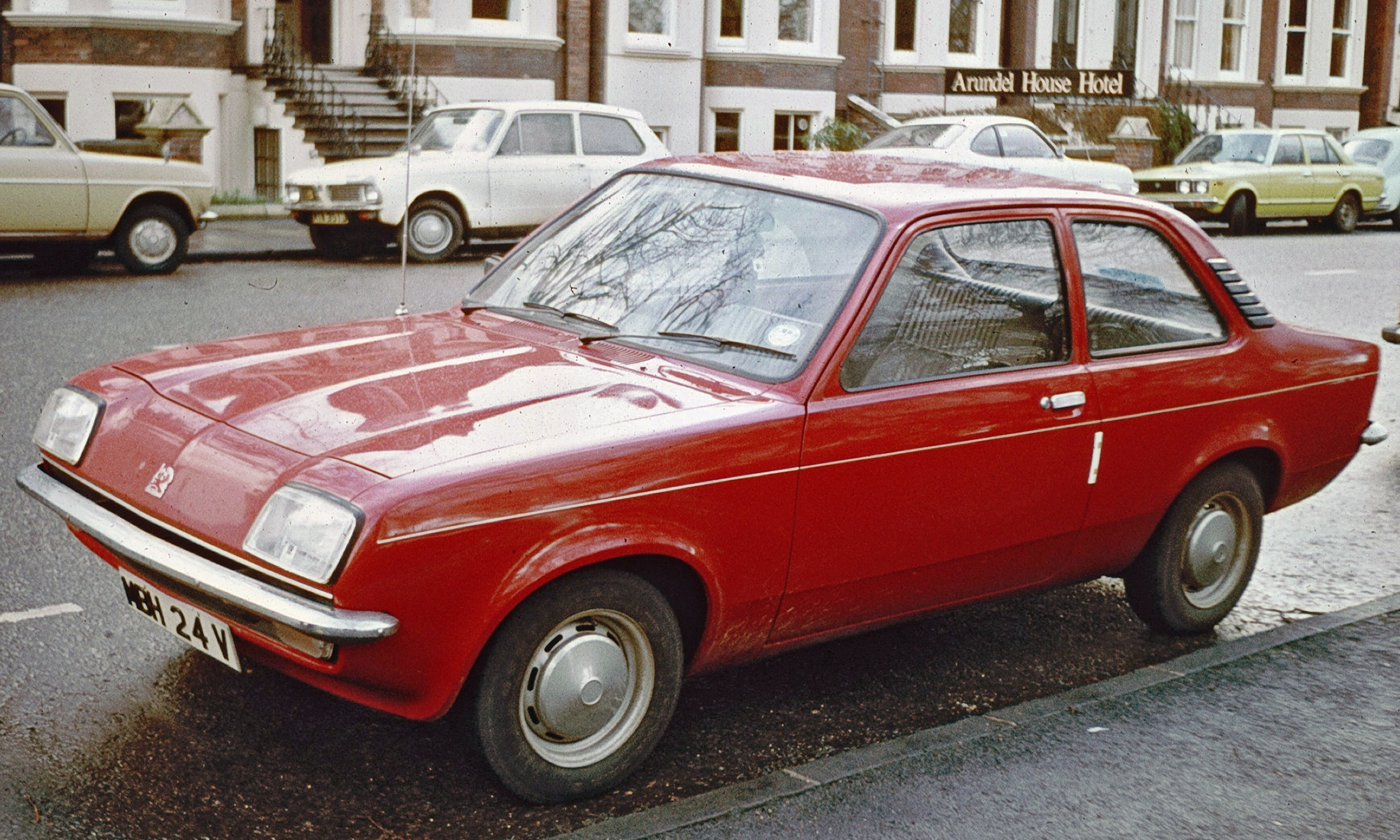
A minor facelift in 1979 included flush-fitting headlights applied to the front of the car and plastic trims to highlight the extractor vents on the rear pillars of the saloon Chevette.

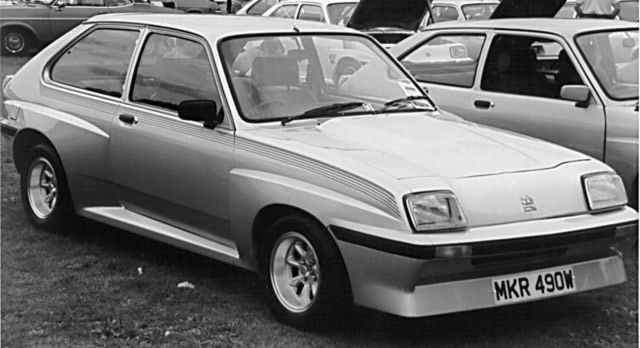
Vauxhall Chevette, a rare HSR rally model in road-going trim

The original hatchback was launched in the UK using Vauxhall's slogan and musical jingle, which capitalised on its practicality and widespread appeal: "It's whatever you want it to be! — A sporty coupé, a family saloon, a handy estate...". It was made at the purpose-built factory in Ellesmere Port, Cheshire, under a government initiative to bring employment to the area.

More conventional two- and four-door saloons, and three-door estate variants (essentially the Kadett C with Vauxhall front bodywork and engines) were also offered from June 1976. The two-door coupé version of the Kadett C was the only version of the Opel car not to have a Chevette equivalent.

The Viva was discontinued in 1979, with the Opel Kadett D entering production in the same year. This car was intended also to be produced in the US and UK, as the second-generation Chevette, but due to various industrial issues at the time, GM decided to shelve most of the Ellesmere Port plant, retaining only the assembly shop to build the new car. These would be assembled from knock-down kits, although they were initially imported fully built-up from Opel's plant in Bochum. Due to the huge loss of workforce this would cause, representations were made that resulted in the decision to continue production of existing models alongside the new. This meant that a new name would have to be found for Vauxhall's version of the new Opel Kadett, so in March 1980, the Vauxhall Astra was born, replacing the Viva in the Vauxhall range, while the Chevette remained on sale until 1984. At this time, the planned mothballing of most of the Ellesmere Port plant went ahead as originally planned. Meanwhile, General Motors would develop a new entry-level model to be sold in Europe under the Vauxhall and Opel marques, and would build a factory in Zaragoza, Spain, for the production of this new car.

This longevity led to the Chevette being exported to Germany after 1979, following the discontinuation of the Kadett C to give German buyers the option of rear-wheel drive following the Kadett D's introduction; the Chevette was unusual as it still featured rear-wheel drive, while most of its competitors were now driven by the front wheels. A further 12,332 Chevettes were sold through Opel dealers in Germany from October 1980, although they never actually carried Opel or Vauxhall branding, being badged simply as "Chevette". By this time, the Chevette was the only Vauxhall-badged car to be sold in markets such as Mauritius and New Zealand; successor models assembled in the UK for sale in mainland Europe, such as the Astra, have been badged as Opels.

A van version, based on the estate and called the Bedford Chevanne, was also built, and badged as part of GM's Bedford commercial vehicles marque.

Following the introduction of the Astra in 1980, the Chevette line-up was gradually slimmed down in terms of both trim options and body styles. By the time of the Nova's launch in 1983 only the four-door saloon and the three-door estate versions (in two trim levels) remained on sale until the end of production.

Although the Chevette was essentially a rebadged Opel Kadett C with revised front-end styling (detailed below), it used the 1,256 cc overhead valve (OHV) engine from the Viva HC instead of the Kadett's 1,196 cc engines, which were produced by Opel. The Kadett's double wishbone front suspension, rear-wheel drive, and rear suspension with panhard rod, torque tube, and coil-sprung live axle, were carried over unaltered. Inside, the two cars differed only in terms of their dashboard and switchgear; the Chevette stuck to the British and Japanese right-hand drive tradition of having the indicator stalk switch on the right side of the steering column, with wipers on the left; while the Kadett used a single stalk system (typical of many 1970s German cars) on the left of the steering column to control turn signals, headlamps and wipers. The Chevette also had a much more angular instrument binnacle, although the instrument cluster itself was directly from the Kadett (though with imperial rather than metric scales).

The Chevette's front end featured a more aerodynamic-looking nose than the Kadett, based loosely on the design of the "droopsnoot" Firenza, itself said to be inspired by the Pontiac Firebird, a sister GM product. In contrast the Kadett had a more conventional, flat-fronted design. In 1980, the Chevette underwent a facelift with flush fitting headlights, giving it a "family look" alongside the larger Vauxhall Cavalier version of the Opel Ascona B. Mechanical changes included the introduction of Bosch distributors, revised heater ducting, and a simplified throttle linkage. It also received new wheel designs, revised C-pillar vent covers, and revamped interior trim with redesigned front seats to increase rear knee room marginally. However, it was effectively the beginning of a phase-out in favour of the newer Astra, Vauxhall's version of the front-wheel drive Kadett D, which was launched in March 1980, though it was not produced in Britain until November 1981. The Vauxhall Nova (the rebadged version of the Spanish built Opel Corsa) became the entry-level model in the Vauxhall range when it was launched in April 1983, although the Chevette continued alongside it for another year.

Production of the Chevette finally finished in 1984. A total of 415,000 Chevettes were sold in Britain.

== Timeline (UK model range) ==
- May 1975 – Introduction of the Chevette three-door hatchback in base and L model variations: Both had an improved version of the 1,256 cc OHV engine from the Viva, with a similar four-speed gearbox, rear-wheel drive, independent front suspension, rack-and-pinion steering, and servo-assisted, dual-circuit brakes. Initial standard equipment included a two-speed heater fan, radial tyres, reversing lights, heated rear window, and reclining front seats.
- November 1975 – Introduction of the Chevette GL with sports wheels with 175 x 70 SR tyres, bumper over riders, and higher equipment level including new centre console, front door pockets and velour interior door panels.
- January 1976 – Limited-edition Chevette E introduced with L-type specification, but with black rubber surrounds on windows, revised brightwork, and vynide (plastic) seats: The U.S. version, the Chevrolet Chevette, was introduced as the smallest domestically produced car there.
- April 1976 – Revisions: base renamed L and gains cloth upholstery; L renamed GL with no changes; GL becomes GLS and gains velour upholstery.
- June 1976 – E and L two- and four-door saloons and GLS four-door saloon were introduced with mechanical specification of hatchback versions. E has a reduced equipment level without reclining front seats. L and GLS have specifications of the hatchback models plus (on GLS) clock, cigar lighter, and bonnet light.
- September 1976 – The Chevette L estate was introduced with the specifications of the saloon model. The Bedford Chevanne van version of Chevette was introduced; it was similar to Chevette estate, but without rear side windows and rear seats.
- January 1977 – Chevette E three-door hatchback introduced with a similar specification to the saloon model.
- January 1978 – Chevette HS three-door hatchback introduced with a 16-valve 2,279 cc. slant-four engine; five-speed, close-ratio gearbox; and uprated brakes and suspension. The HS also featured a full front air dam, rear spoiler, black and tartan interior trim, additional instrumentation, and wide alloy wheels. All HS's were painted silver with red decals. Other versions of the HS included the HS-X (with black exterior paint and walnut trimmed interior) and the Panther Westwinds (with single-cam turbo), both of which were made in very small numbers.
- October 1978 – The Chevette GL four-door saloon model was introduced with a similar specification to the hatchback model. GL hatchback now has sports wheels, additional bright trim around the windows, and matte-black rear panel. GLS saloon discontinued.
- September 1979 – Revisions: All models fitted with flush-fitting headlights, restyled seats, front door pockets, additional fascia vents, new badging and rear fog lights. Protective side mouldings on GL models. Optional three-speed automatic transmission available on L and GL models.
- November 1979 – The rear-wheel drive Opel Kadett C range was discontinued and replaced by a new front-wheel range with the same model name.
- April 1980 – Chevette E estate introduced with specification of hatchback and saloon versions; the E model was intended for the fleet market. Limited edition Chevette Special two and four-door saloons launched, based on L models. Introduction of the Chevette HSR, an evolution of the Chevette HS.
- June 1980 – Limited edition Chevette Sun Hatch three-door hatchback model introduced, based on the Chevette L model, but additionally fitted with sunroof, tinted glass, sports wheels, metallic paint, bodyside mouldings, side direction indicator flashers, front head restraints, clock and push-button radio. The Sun Hatch could be had with either manual or automatic transmission, with the manual version priced at £3,954 and the automatic version priced at £4,167.
- October 1980 – Chevette ES two-door saloon and three-door hatchback introduced with similar specification to the E models but an even lower level of kit with vinyl trim plus carpets. E revised with plaid cloth upholstery; L with radio and quartz clock; GL with front head restraints, radio and (on hatchback) load area cover.
- May 1981 – Limited edition Chevette Black Pearl introduced with black paintwork, silver strobe stripes and ES type specification.
- January 1982 – Limited edition Chevette Silhouette three-door hatchback introduced with black paintwork, strobe stripes and ES type specification.
- September 1982 – E and ES models discontinued; range now consists of L and GL saloons and hatchbacks and L estate. Revisions: all models now have laminated windscreen. L models now have push-button radio.
- August 1983 – With the introduction of the Nova four months earlier, the Chevette range was reduced to just the L four-door saloon and three-door estate.
- January 1984 – Production of the Chevette L four-door saloon and three-door estate, the last available models, ends. The end of Chevette production also marked the end of production of Vauxhall models visually distinct from those designed by Opel.

== Overseas markets ==
=== Austria ===
The Chevette was also sold in Austria, where it was also offered with the option of a low output version of the 1,256 engine (49.5 bhp). The range included two- and four-door L saloon and estate, GL three-door hatch, GLS four-door saloon and three-door hatch.

=== Ecuador ===
The local factory Aymesa produced a version of the Chevette starting in 1978. This version was called the AYMESA Cóndor. It had a glass fibre (fibreglass or glass reinforced plastic) body and a 1,500 cc engine with the higher compression cylinder head from GM Brazil to compensate for the Andean altitudes.

=== France ===
The Chevette was also sold in France but it did not sell well against the Peugeots and Renaults of the time. The Chevette was the last Vauxhall sold in France.

On 6 December 1979, Vauxhall announced that they were withdrawing from 11 major European countries where Vauxhall and Opel models were sold together. This was to be completed by the end of 1981.

=== Germany ===
Despite announcing its withdrawal from continental Europe, Vauxhall said it would export Chevettes to West Germany. At the time Opel had already started selling the Kadett D / Astra Mk1, but it was felt that there was still a market for the previous rear-wheel drive model, as a low-cost option and for buyers resistant to front-wheel drive. Accordingly, the Chevette was sold without Vauxhall badging through Opel dealers with a 1256 cc 53 PS N and a 57 PS S automatic. The only Vauxhall badging to remain was on the hub caps and steering wheel.

=== New Zealand ===
The Chevette was assembled by General Motors New Zealand between 1976 and 1981. All body styles that were available in the UK were sold. The first models built were three-door hatchbacks.

New Zealand had the Chevette as well as the Isuzu Gemini, while neighbouring Australia had only the Isuzu Gemini-based Holden Gemini. The Vauxhall 1,256 OHV (from the Viva and Magnum) was the standard engine unit for all New Zealand Chevette models.

Most models were of GL specification and all had metric instrumentation. A lower trim Chevanne commercial fleet model was also offered, however, unlike the European models, it used the estate bodyshell — complete with side windows — and was badged as a Vauxhall, rather than as a Bedford.

In 1979 the New Zealand Chevette had a mechanical update not fitted to the European models, Holden-developed Radial Tuned Suspension and wider tyres, giving the car superior handling over its rivals.

At the beginning of 1980 the Chevette received the facelift which included flush mounted headlamps and various new interior appointments, including extra air vents and different seats, giving more legroom in the cars.

An additional base E model was introduced to the range in 1980, aimed at fleets and budget-minded buyers, using the four-door bodyshell. This car was incredibly spartan – fitted with plain wheels and vinyl seats – and lacked reversing lamps, hazard flashers, radio and many gauges.

Production of the New Zealand Chevette ceased in June 1981, when it was replaced by the Holden Gemini, which for the New Zealand market had initially been sold as an Isuzu in the mid-1970s and then been dropped before being reintroduced. The Chevette was the last British-sourced GM product to be assembled in New Zealand.

=== Sweden ===
The Chevette was also sold in Sweden. It entered the market for 1976, originally only as a hatchback so as not to compete directly with the larger Viva. The range ended up a little differently from that of the UK with the two-door saloon and three-door estate only available in L spec and the hatch and four-door saloon only available in GLS spec — no E or GL models were offered, although the GL was originally planned.

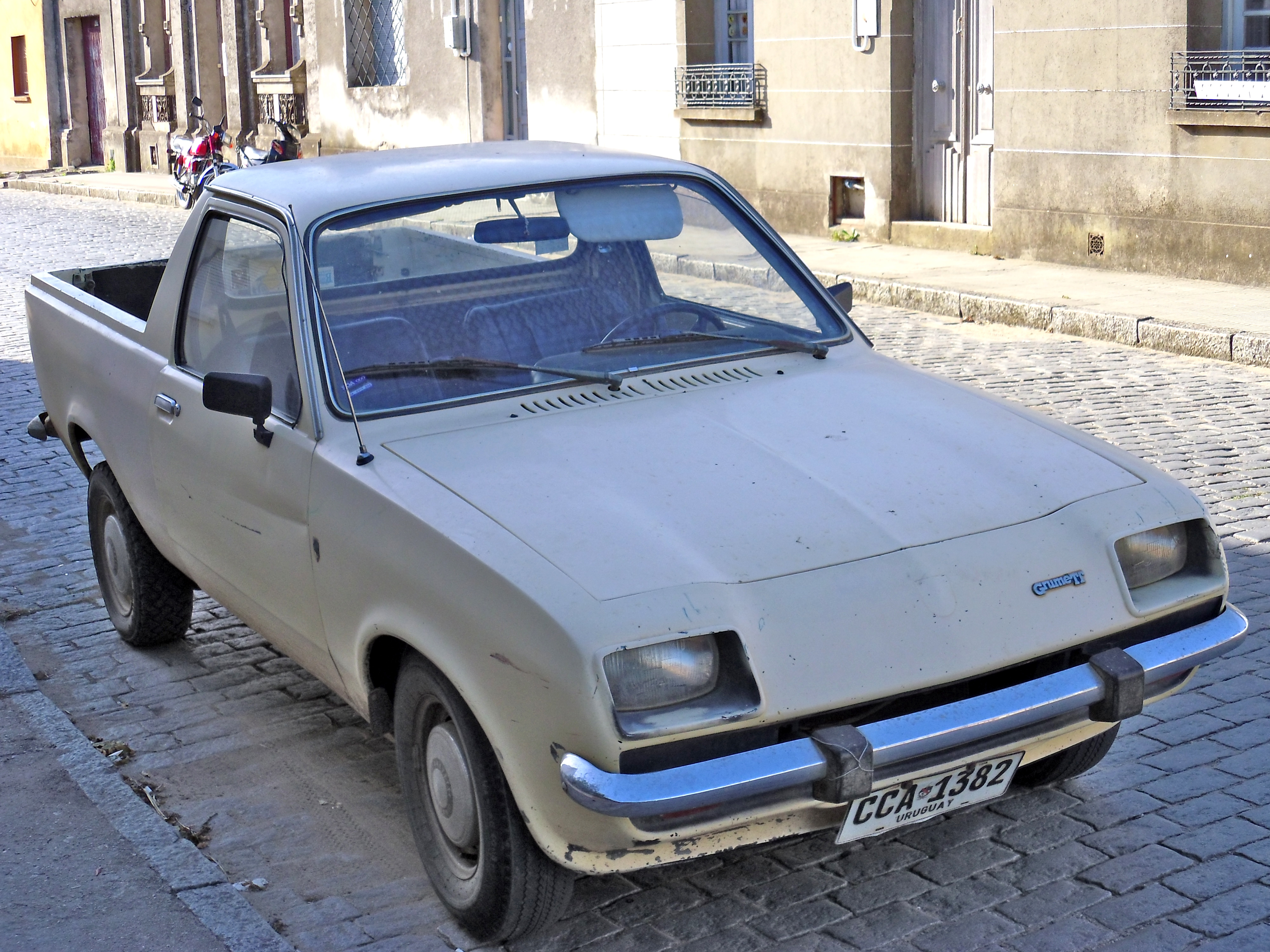
Vauxhall Chevette-style, plastic-bodied Grumett coupé utility (Uruguay)

=== Uruguay ===
In Uruguay, the Viva-based Grumett had been marketed since 1962. This was a 2+2 coupé utility based on the Viva HC, with imported metal doors and locally made fibreglass front and rear ends. A similarly constructed version of the Vauxhall Chevette was created to replace the original Grumett. However, this featured the 1.4-litre engine and mechanical underpinnings of the Brazilian Chevrolet Chevette. This was succeeded by a version which featured the Brazilian Chevette bodywork, although this time it was also available as an estate.

== Special models ==
=== Chevette HS and HSR ===
In 1976, at the instigation of new chairman Bob Price, Vauxhall decided to increase their profile in international rallying. They developed a rally version of the Chevette in conjunction with Blydenstein Racing, which ran Dealer Team Vauxhall, the nearest equivalent to a 'works' (manufacturer run) competition team that GM policy would allow.

In order to compete in international rallying, the car had to be homologated; for Group 4, the class the HS was to compete in, this meant building 400 production vehicles for public sale. Vauxhall created a far more powerful Chevette variant by fitting the 2.3 litre slant-four engine, using a 16-valve cylinder head which Vauxhall was developing — though the rally cars used the Lotus 16-valve head until a rule change by the FIA banned them in 1978. (Note: The use of alternative heads with different numbers of cams and valves (and several alternative engine and transmission components, etc.) was allowed under the FIAs homologation rules for 1975 (Appendix J to the International Sporting Code, article 260, clause bb) if 100 "bolt on option kits" were produced, listed as spares, made available for sale to anyone, and approved by the FIA (with the RAC acting as local representative). This rule was removed from the version of appendix J for 1976, but mechanical elements and cars already homologated using it were allowed to continue to be used for rallying until the end of 1977. While the HS was homologated in November 1976 (homologation form number 649, backdated from April 1977), Vauxhall appear to have been allowed to rally cars with the 16-valve Lotus head when the standard road cars used the GM head because it had been homologated on other cars before the end of 1975 — several other teams were still using cars with similar modifications under the extension to the old rule, including the Triumph TR7 and Toyota Celica, and possibly the Lancia Stratos and Ford RS1800/Escort RS (Triumph and Ford appear to have had their modifications approved for use into 1978, by producing, probably, about 50 or 60 more road cars with the necessary modifications in 1977). According to a contemporary article in the Autosport magazine (R. Saunders (Ed.), Chevette 2300 HS-what went wrong, 27 April 1978), Graham Robson wrote an article, with the consent of Vauxhall, detailing the differences between the road and rally cars, including the Lotus head, triple plate clutch, and ZF gearbox: all of which would have been legal until the end of 1977, but not thereafter. Consequently, the car was re-inspected by the CSI (an autonomous sub-committee of the FIA) on 7 April 1978, and Vauxhall were told they had to remove the Lotus heads, etc. However, Vauxhall appear to have believed they had a waiver on these changes until 1 May 1978, though the inspectors gave them nothing in writing. Moreover, the CSI telexed the scrutineers at the Portugal Rally not to let the cars start unless the changes had been made. Since these changes could not be made there and then, the cars were withdrawn.) Fitted with two Stromberg carburettors the engine developed 135 bhp. Suspension and rear axle were from the Opel Kadett C GT/E and the gearbox was a Getrag five-speed. Chevrolet Vega alloy wheels (similar in appearance to the Avon wheels used on the droopsnoot Firenza) were used, as well as a newly developed glass-reinforced plastic air dam. The result was a very fast and well handling, if rather unrefined, road car. Like the Droopsnoot Firenza, the HS was available only in silver, with red highlighting and a bright red, black and tartan interior; though (partly to help sell unsold vehicles) some cars were repainted in other colours, such the black HS-X designed by David Harley of Mamos Roundabout Garage — Greenford.

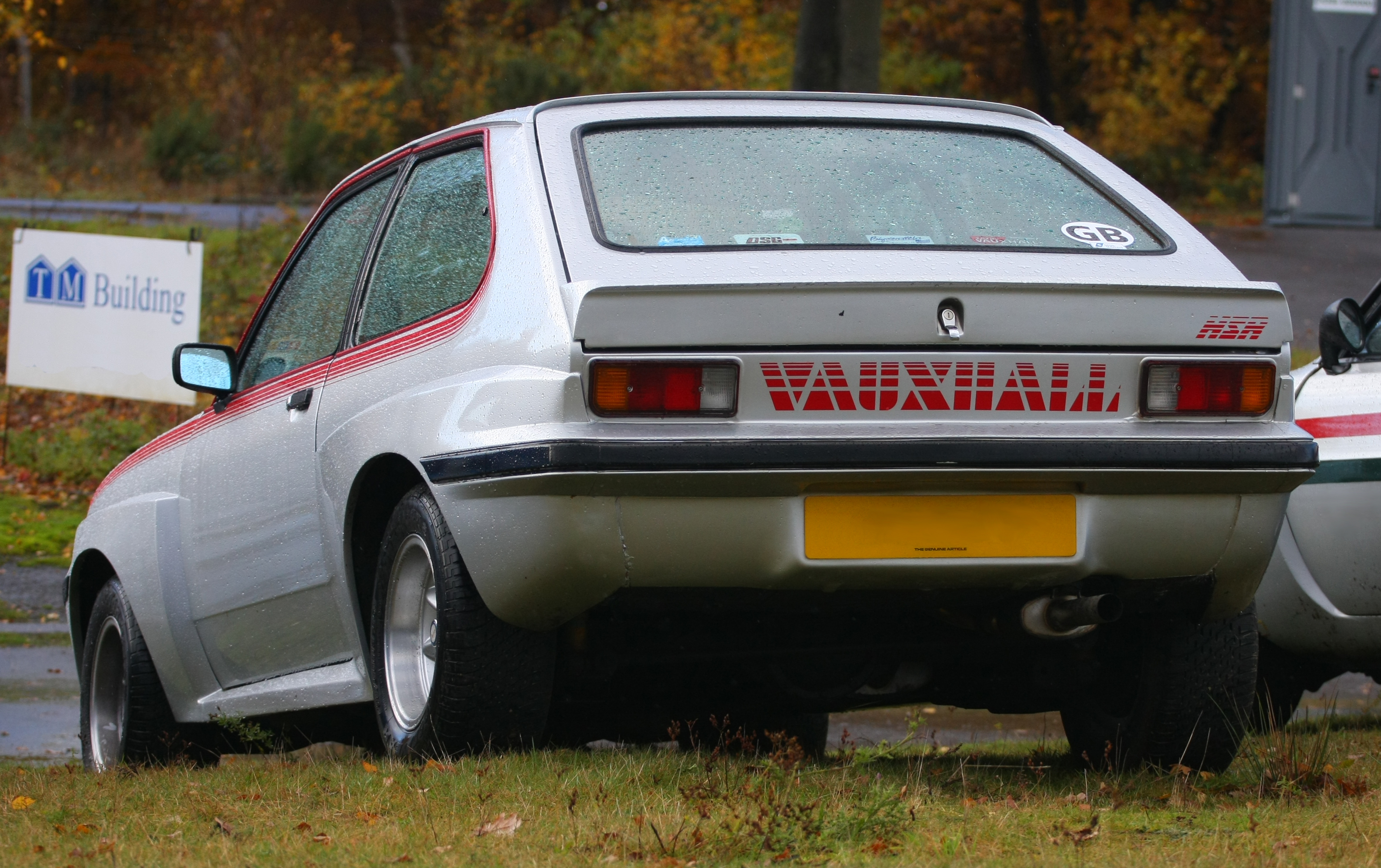
Chevette HSR evolution version

The HS became a successful rally car, chalking up notable wins for drivers such as Pentti Airikkala, Jimmy McRae and Tony Pond. It was a challenge to the most successful rally car of the time, the Ford Escort, winning the British Open Rally Championship for drivers in 1979 and for manufacturers in 1981. It was also successful in other national rally championships, such as Belgium's.

To keep the rally car competitive into the 1980s an evolution version, the Chevette HSR, was developed which was successful for several more years. The modified cars featured glass reinforced plastic (fibreglass) front and rear wings, spoiler, bonnet and tailgate (giving the HSR the nickname 'Plastic Fantastic'), revised suspension (particularly at the rear, where extra suspension links were fitted), and other minor changes. Group 4 evolution required a production run of 50 cars incorporating the new modifications; these were made by rebuilding unsold HSs and by modifying customers' vehicles. However, the merger of the Vauxhall and Opel marketing departments resulted in Dealer Team Vauxhall and Dealer Opel Team (DOT) joining to form GM Dealer Sport (GMDS); with the Chevette soon to be obsolete, Opel were able to force the cancellation of the HSR rally programme in favour of the Manta 400. A 2.6-litre engine for Clubsport rallying and a 300 hp (224 kW), turbocharged derivative were never fully developed, thanks to the budget cuts. A few examples of the 220 hp (164 kW) 2.6-litre engine were built, with Blydenstein offering the engine for hire to replace the 2.3-litre "international" engine for single events.

=== Chevette Blackwatch ===
These were special edition Chevettes made by Star Custom Vehicles, Station Road, Ampthill. They came with black and silver paint, red graphics, a plaque inside the door stating styles by Farina, sport steering wheel, flared arches and low-profile wheels. Blackwatch was written on the nose of the car and on the bottom of each door.

=== Chevette Grenadier ===
Also produced by Star Custom Vehicles, based on the Chevette L hatchback specification, with black, silver and orchid livery, colour impregnated front air dam, flexi rear spoiler, alloy wheels with locking option, head restraints, black four-spoke sport steering wheel, centre console, burled walnut fascia, hinged glove box and door capping, removable tinted glass sun hatch, and two-wave band radio / stereo cassette player with door speakers.

Both the above special editions were created by Rob Darcus of Star Custom Vehicles, who began developing special trim versions of standard models to help sell more vehicles when he was district manager for Vauxhall in London. He and Vauxhall dealer Hamilton Motors set up the Star Custom Vehicles facility in Ampthill, Bedfordshire, to carry out specialised paint work on Chevette 'dealer specials' (cars restyled and re-trimmed for the dealer network and not available as a standard trim from the manufacturer). Initially cars were supplied to the London dealers that Rob Darcus was responsible for; following interest from Vauxhall, the vehicles were supplied nationally.

=== Chevette Jubilee ===
This special edition was produced in silver to commemorate the Queen's Silver Jubilee in 1977.

=== Bedford Chevanne ===
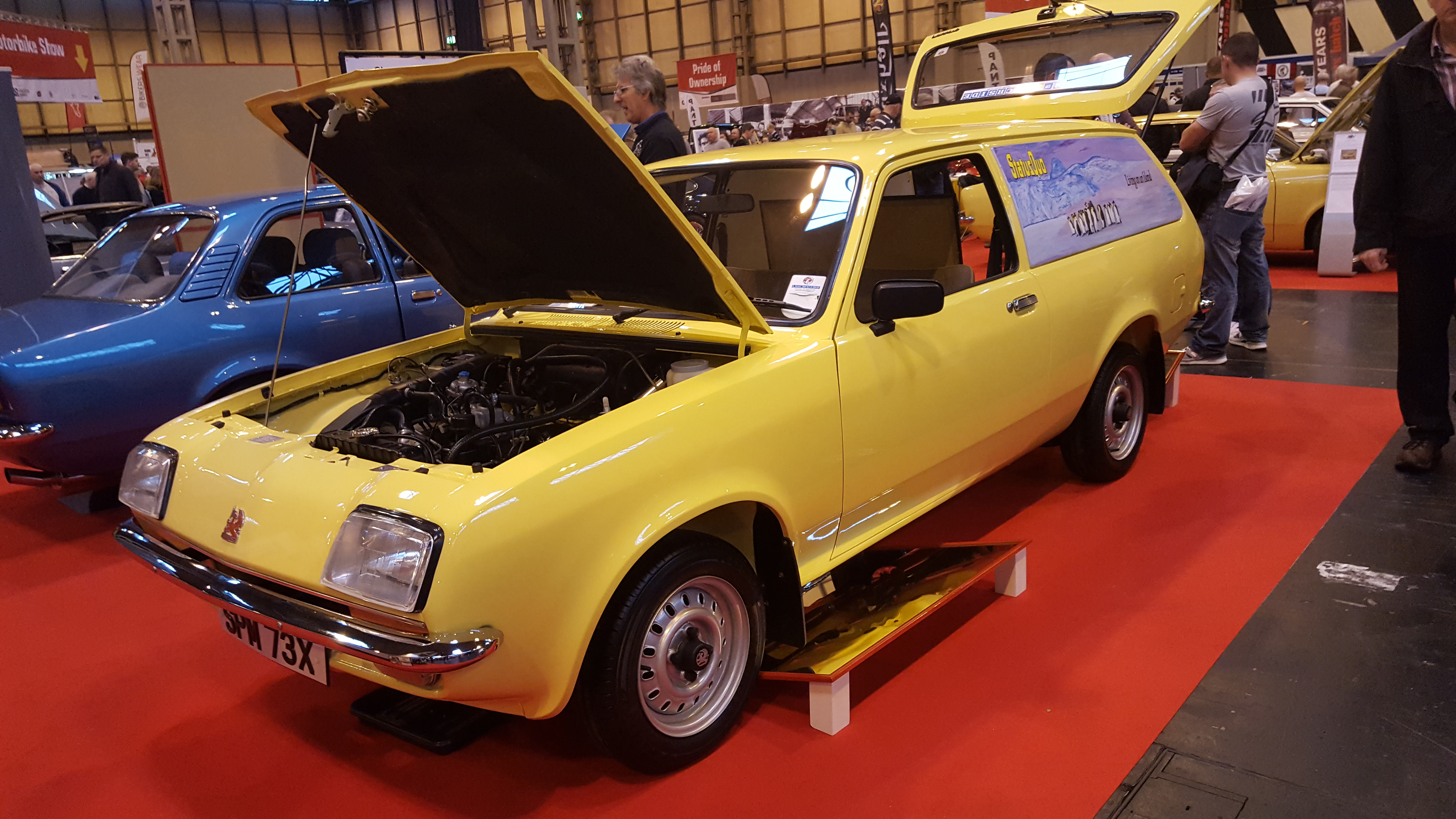
1982 Bedford Chevanne

The Bedford Chevanne was a small commercial vehicle based on the GM T platform Vauxhall Chevette estate. Unlike the Chevette it had a flat rear floor, no rear seats and panels in place of the side windows. It was introduced in September 1976. Intended as a replacement for the Bedford HA, the Chevanne was replaced by the Bedford Astravan in October 1982, while the HA remained in production for an additional year. The Chevanne was fitted with the same 1,256 cc inline-four as the Chevette (and the Bedford HA), although here it produced 39.3 kW (53.4 PS; 52.7 hp) with a 7.3 to 1 compression ratio. As part of making the Chevanne as car-like as possible, it was also available with a three-speed automatic transmission. The automatic also included a heavy-duty battery and front suspension, better carpeting, and a higher compression engine (8.7 to 1) with 42 kW (57.1 PS; 56.3 hp).

A similar T-Car variant existed in Australia, the Holden Gemini van, which utilized the Chevanne's rear panels.
