= Dealer Team Vauxhall =

British motorsport organisation (1971–1981)

Dealer Team Vauxhall, commonly known as DTV, was a motorsport organisation.

In the absence of any official motorsport sponsorship by General Motors globally, and by its Vauxhall Motors subsidiary specifically, a group of London-based Vauxhall dealers decided to start an organisation to financially support racing and rallying of Vauxhall cars. It was established in January 1971.

Initially the racing program was run by Bill Blydenstein, an engine tuner and racing driver, and the rallying program by Chris Coburn. In 1976 Blydenstein became responsible for both racing and rallying. From 1978 on, the focus was entirely on rallying.

Vauxhall models developed by DTV for racing and rallying include the Viva, Firenza, Magnum, Victor, and Chevette.

Drivers included Gerry Marshall, Will Sparrow, Barrie 'Whizzo' Williams, Jimmy McRae, Pentti Airikkala and others. Rally co-drivers included Rodney Spokes, Nigel Raeburn and Don Barrow.

The 1981 franchise merger of Vauxhall and Opel also brought DTV and the corresponding German Dealer Opel Team (DOT) under one marketing umbrella, resulting in a new organisation called General Motors DealerSport.
