= Vauxhall Equus =

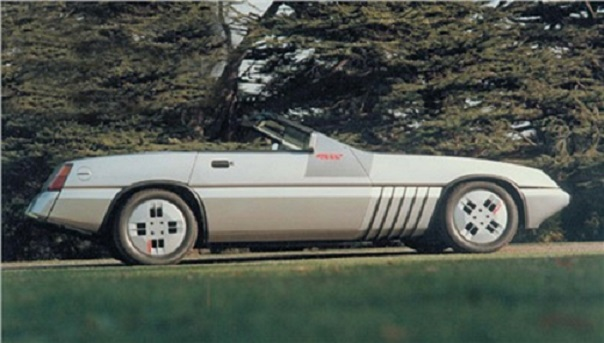
- Vauxhall Equus (1978)

Overview
- Manufacturer: Panther
- Production: 1978 (one built)
- Designer: Wayne Cherry (design director)

Body and chassis
- Class: Concept car
- Body style: 2-door convertible
- Layout: FR layout
- Related: Panther Lima

Powertrain
- Engine: 2.3 L (2,279 cc) OHC Vauxhall I4

The Vauxhall Equus was a two-door concept car first presented by Vauxhall in spring, 1978. The word equus is Latin for horse. It was the last concept car from Vauxhall for 25 years until August 2003, when the VX Lightning was unveiled at the 2004 Sunday Times Motorshow as part of the centrepiece to the company's centenary celebrations.

== Specifications ==
The Equus was based on the chassis of the Panther Lima, which itself was based on mechanicals of the Vauxhall Magnum. Panther built the prototype.

== Design ==
The Equus was styled by a team led by Wayne Cherry, along with his chief designer John Taylor. Work started in 1977 and the car was unveiled at the 1978 Birmingham NEC Motor Show. The design brief emphasised the use of parts by Vauxhall whenever possible. It featured an angular wedge design with Vauxhall's signature "droopsnoot" front end, which was initially made popular by the Vauxhall Firenza.
