= Vauxhall Magnum =

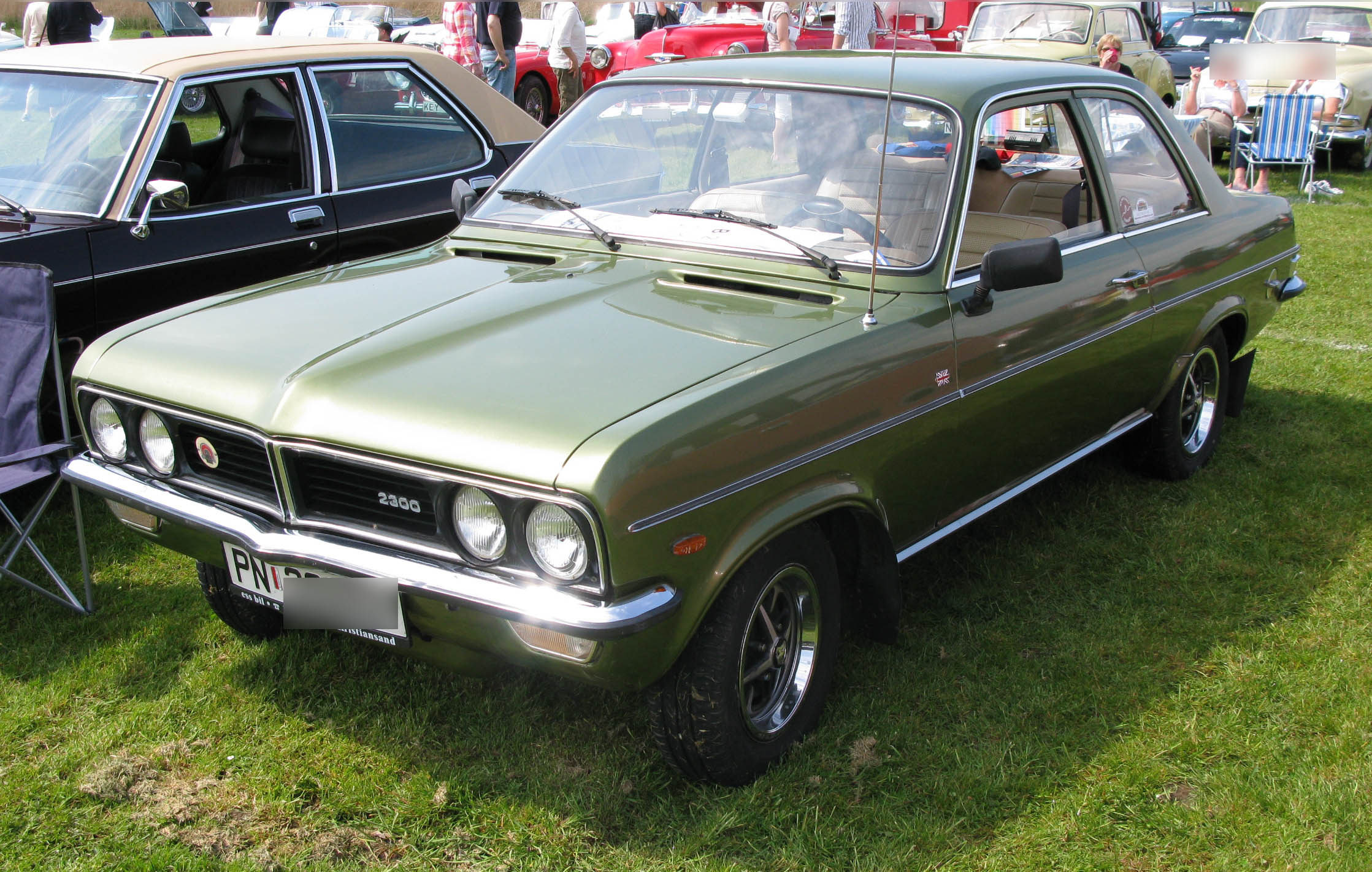
- Vauxhall Magnum 2-door saloon

Overview
- Manufacturer: Vauxhall (General Motors)
- Production: 1973–1978
- Assembly: Ellesmere Port, Cheshire, England

Body and chassis
- Class: Small family car
- Body style: 2-door saloon; 2-door coupé; 4-door saloon; 3-door estate
- Related: Vauxhall Viva HC; Vauxhall Firenza; Chevrolet Firenza

Powertrain
- Engine: 1759 cc ohc I4; 2279 cc ohc I4
- Transmission: 4-speed manual 3-speed Automatic

Dimensions
- Wheelbase: 97 in (2,464 mm)
- Length: 163 in (4,140 mm)
- Width: 64.75 in (1,645 mm)
- Height: 53.125 in (1,349 mm)
- Curb weight: 2,150 lb (975 kg)

Chronology
- Successor: Vauxhall Astra

The Vauxhall Magnum is a car which was manufactured by Vauxhall from 1973 to 1978. First seen at the London Motor Show in October 1973, the Magnum was an HC Viva with a larger engine, more luxurious interior, higher trim level and four rather than two headlights. It shared its suspension and drive train with the larger-engined variants of the Vauxhall Viva and Firenza.

The smaller-engined version used the 1800 cc Slant-Four engine, and a twin-dial instrument panel, while the more powerful version used the 2279 cc Slant-Four and had a seven-dial instrument panel. Both were available in 2- and 4-door versions, a 3-door fastback estate and a coupé. All had "Rostyle" wheels. Confusingly, it was also possible to buy certain Viva models with the larger engines, but with vinyl interior trim. The continuing lack of coherency of the model range during that period was one of Vauxhall's main marketing problems. Late in the model's life there was a mild "upgrade" which saw the 2300 switch from twin to single carb with a drop of 2 hp to 108 hp, although the 1800 jumped from 77 hp to 88 hp which cut the 0–60 mph time by 3s to 12.5s, and raised the top speed to 100 mph from 93 mph previously.

The Magnum badge also superseded the Firenza badge used on the two-door coupé model, which name was then used exclusively for the HPF "droopsnoot" model from 1974 (see Firenza). The Magnum model range continued until 1978: by then it was increasingly being overshadowed in the domestic market place by the Ascona-based Vauxhall Cavalier.

The various trim and body options that were originally exclusive to the Magnum made their way over to the Viva, producing the top-of-the-line Viva GLS, in a bid to shore up the increasingly poor sales of the model. The main difference aside from badging was that the Viva GLS only had the 1256 cc and 1759 cc engines, the latter only with an automatic box. The Viva range was finally discontinued in 1979. The Magnum name was adopted for the Viva 1300 in New Zealand from 1975, where it had the four headlight frontal treatment of the British Magnum, but standard Viva interior trim.

A special variant of the Magnum estate, known as the Sportshatch, was produced in limited numbers (197) in 1976. This model used the "droopsnoot" nose cone, which had been designed by Wayne Cherry, Vauxhall's Chief Design Engineer to be used in the HP Firenza Droop Snoot model. First prototype registered by Vauxhall WXE939M was showcased at Earls Court 1974 motor show. In Trevor Alder's book "Vauxhall — The Post War Years" mention is made of a HP Firenza Sport Hatch second prototype which was a one-off and was painted in silver starfire, with a six-light version of the droop snoot nose and also sharing the Viva/Magnum estate body shell. This car (registration plate GNK 31N) has survived and is known to be in the hands of Vauxhall enthusiasts.

The HP Firenza project was proposed to produce over 2,000 cars a year, but production of this model ceased after just 204 cars were registered in the UK. Some nose cones were left over at end of production and these were used in the limited run of "Sports Hatch" models as described above.

The Sports Hatch limited edition did not share the uprated 2279 cc slant four engine with the HP Firenza Droop Snoot model, but instead was fitted with the standard tune single carb 2279 cc slant four engine and running gear of the Magnum. Also included in the standard specification was the famous "seven dial dash", Avon Safety Wheels and a distinctive paint finish in a then brand new Vauxhall "Extra Dark Wine" (only available otherwise on the brand new for 1976 VX 2300 GLS model) which was complemented with bright red striping and highlights. This model was always rare with the 2 prototypes, 195 UK registered and 3 local Export meant only 200 vehicles being completed and is now highly collectable. Vauxhall marketed this car as a "hatchback", since it was coming under increasing pressure from new European models such as the Golf that were hatchbacks. However, the Sportshatch shared its bodyshell with the Viva Estate (which was only ever produced in a two-door plus tailgate configuration).

The Magnum coupé is also worthy of mention in the Magnum range. There were only 1692 coupés produced from late 1973 to early 1975 with the majority sold later in the model's life due to the 1973 oil crisis. The Magnum range had larger engines than most other Vauxhalls thus were one of the cars with the most affected sales in this period. The 2279 cc engined car had a particularly short run of only 525, according to Vauxhall 427 cars were produced in 1974 and 98 in 1975, only 1167 1759 cc engined coupés were produced.

Performance was quite brisk, but fuel economy was never the Magnum's (or the Vauxhall Slant Four Engine's generally) strong point. In normal use the Magnum 2300 would manage around 25mpg, rising to over 30mpg on a restrained motorway journey.

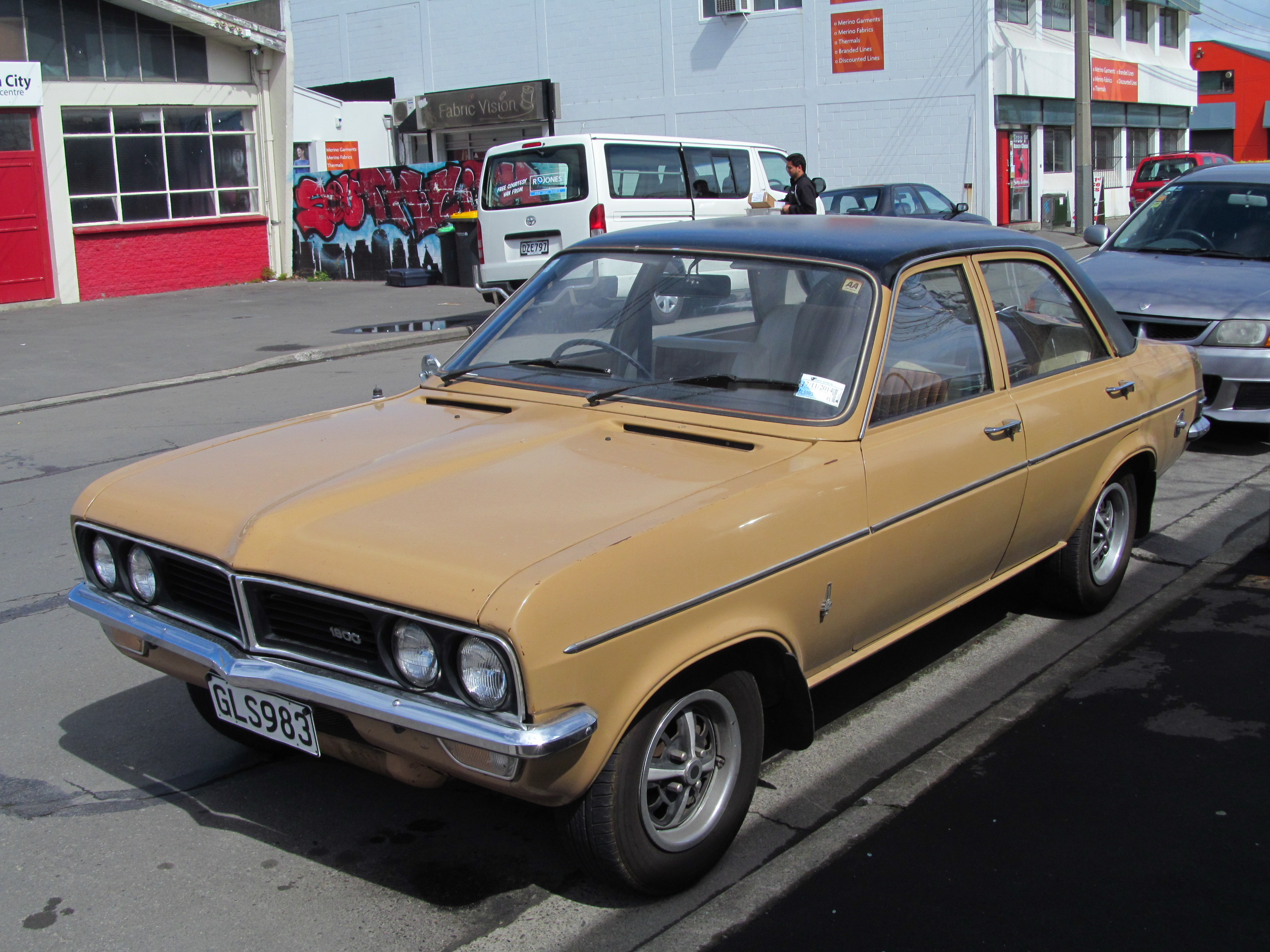
1976 Vauxhall Magnum 1800 4-door saloon

== Variations ==
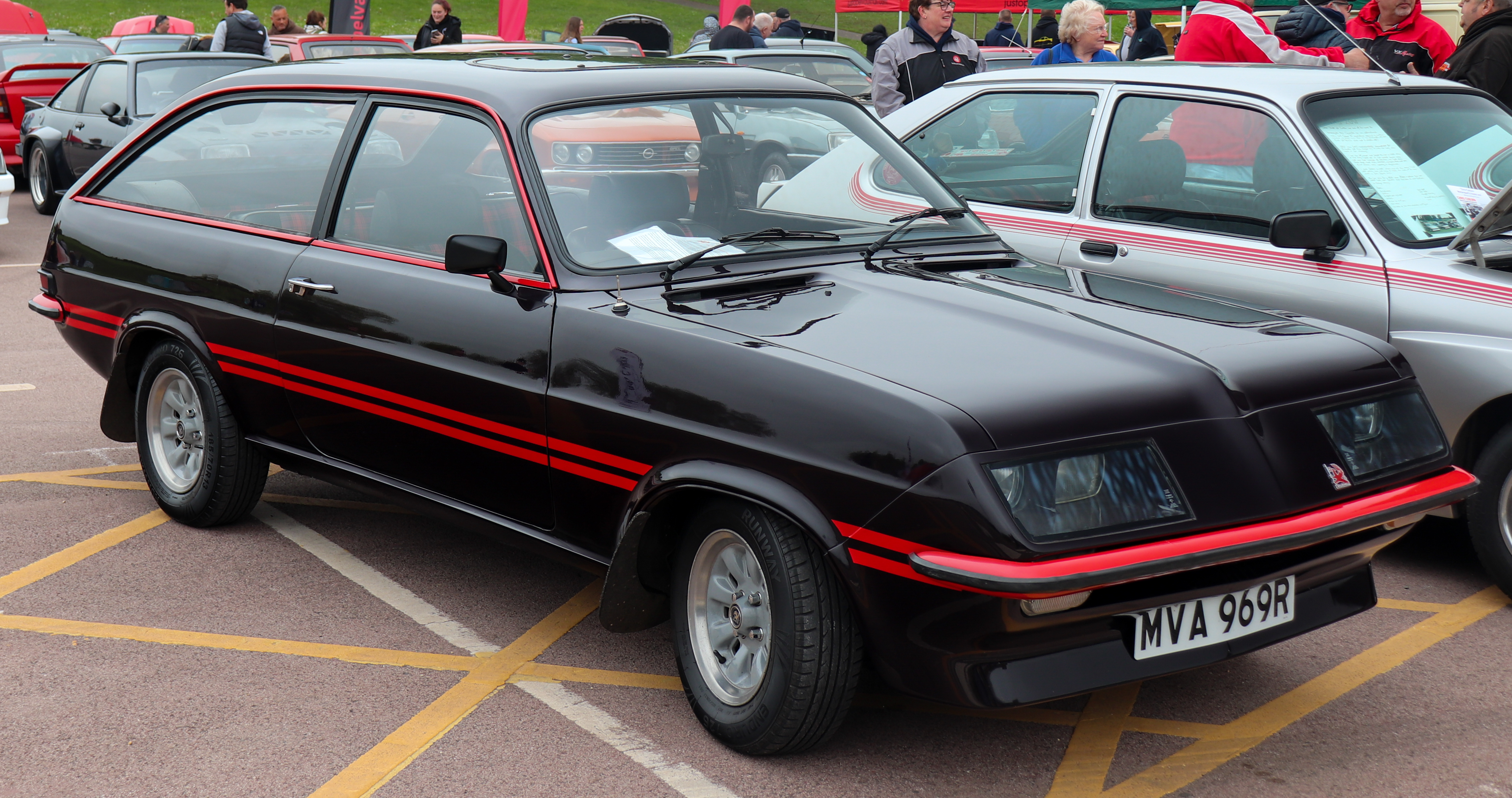

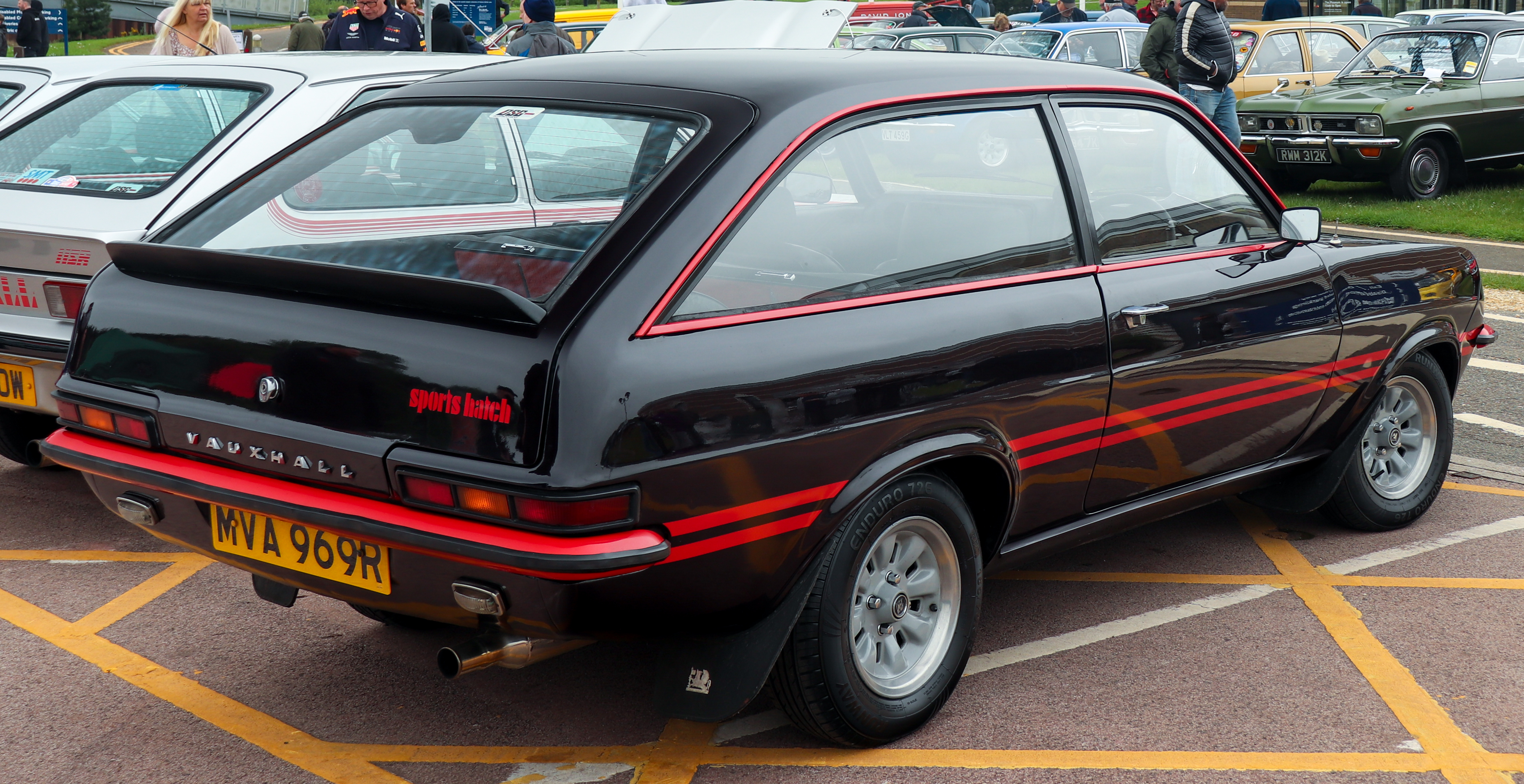
Sportshatch variant of the Magnum — only 197 were built.

Model type	Body style	Produced	Engine	Transmission
Magnum	2-door Saloon; 4-door Saloon; 3-door Estate	1973–1977; 1973–1977; 1973–1977	4 cyl 1759 cc 4 cyl 2279 cc	Manual; Automatic
Magnum Coupé	2-door coupé	1973–1975; 1974–1975	4 cyl 1759 cc 4 cyl 2279 cc	Manual
Magnum Sports	3-door Estate	1976	4 cyl 2279 cc	Manual
