= Car Designer of the Century =

Designer of the century

The Car Designer of the Century was an international award given to the most influential car designer of the 20th century. The election process was overseen by the Global Automotive Elections Foundation.

The winner, Giorgetto Giugiaro, was announced at an awards gala on December 18, 1999 in Las Vegas.

== The selection process ==
The process for deciding the Car Designer of the Century started with the list of candidates below.

The candidates
Name	Notable works
Uwe Bahnsen	Ford Taunus, Ford Sierra
Nuccio Bertone	
Flaminio Bertoni	Citroën Traction Avant, Citroën DS, Citroën 2CV, Citroën Ami
Gordon Buehrig	Cord 810
Jean Bugatti	Bugatti Atlantic
Wayne Cherry	Vauxhall SRV, Pontiac Solstice, Cadillac Sixteen
Harley Earl	Cadillac LaSalle
Virgil Exner	Chrysler 300
Leonardo Fioravanti	Ferrari Daytona, Ferrari Berlinetta Boxer
Pietro Frua	Maserati
Tom Gale	Plymouth Prowler, Dodge Viper, Dodge Stealth
Marcello Gandini	Lamborghini Miura, Lamborghini Countach, Fiat X1/9, Lancia Stratos, Citroën BX
Giorgetto Giugiaro	Maserati Ghibli, Audi 80, Alfa Romeo Sprint, Alfa Romeo Alfasud, Volkswagen Golf, Volkswagen Scirocco, Fiat 850 Sport Spider, Fiat Uno, Lotus Esprit, Lancia Delta, DMC DeLorean, Lexus GS
Patrick le Quément	Renault Twingo, Renault Scénic, Renault Initiale Concept
Raymond Loewy	Hupmobile, Studebaker Avanti
Giovanni Michelotti	Triumph Herald, Triumph Spitfire, Triumph TR4, BMW 700, Renault Alpine A110, DAF 55
Bill Mitchell	Chevrolet Corvette, Chevrolet Corvair
Robert Opron	Alfa Romeo SZ, Citroën SM, Citroën GS, Citroën CX, Renault Fuego, Renault 9, Renault 11, Renault 25
Battista Pininfarina	
Mario Revelli di Beaumont	Simca 1000
Bruno Sacco	Mercedes Benz S-Class (W126 series), Mercedes Benz 190 (W201 series)
Sixten Sason	Saab 93, Saab 99
Ercole Spada	Aston Martin DB4 GT Zagato, Alfa Romeo TZ, Osca GT, Lancia Fulvia Sport
Jack Telnack	Ford Mustang
Jan Wilsgaard	Volvo Amazon (P1200/120), Volvo 144, Volvo 240, Volvo 850

The next step was for a jury of 132 professional automotive journalists, from 33 countries, under the presidency of Lord Montagu of Beaulieu, to reduce the list to 5, which they did, and the result was announced in November 1999. Finally the 5 were ranked by the jury and the overall winner was selected.

== See also ==
- List of motor vehicle awards
- Car of the Century
- Car Engineer of the Century
- Car Entrepreneur of the Century
- Car Executive of the Century
