= SRV =

SRV may refer to:

== Computing ==
- SRV record as used in the Domain Name System
- /srv, a directory on Unix-like computer systems

== Music ==
- Stevie Ray Vaughan, American blues and blues-rock guitarist (1954–1990)
- "S.R.V.", an instrumental track from guitarist Eric Johnson's 1996 album Venus Isle

== Government ==
- Statens Räddningsverk, Rescue Services Agency (Sweden)

== Vehicles ==
- Cirrus Design SRV, a budget Cirrus SR20 aircraft
- Vauxhall SRV, a 1970 concept automobile
- Submarine Rescue Vessel
- SRV Dominator, a stormchasing automobile
- Special Reconnaissance Vehicle of the Irish Army Ranger Wing

== Other uses ==
- Safety relief valve
- Score Runoff Voting, later named STAR voting
- Serenissima Repubblica di Venezia, Italian for the Most Serene Republic of Venice
- Simian retrovirus, a betaretrovirus
- Social role valorization
- Socialist Republic of Vietnam, official name of Vietnam
- Stony River, Alaska, airport, US, IATA code
