= Charles Wiggins =

Charles Wiggins may refer to:

- Charles E. Wiggins (1927–2000), U.S. representative from California and U.S. federal judge
- Charles K. Wiggins, member of the Washington Supreme Court
- Charlie Wiggins (Charles Edwin Wiggins, 1897–1979), American racing driver
- Raphael Saadiq (Charles Ray Wiggins, born 1966), American musician
