= Car Entrepreneur of the Century =

The Car Entrepreneur of the Century was an international award given to the most influential car entrepreneur of the 20th century. The election process was overseen by the Global Automotive Elections Foundation.

The winner, Henry Ford, was announced at an awards gala on December 18, 1999, in Las Vegas.

== See also ==
- List of motor vehicle awards
- Car of the Century
- Car Designer of the Century
- Car Engineer of the Century
