= Ed Welburn =

American automobile designer (born 1950)

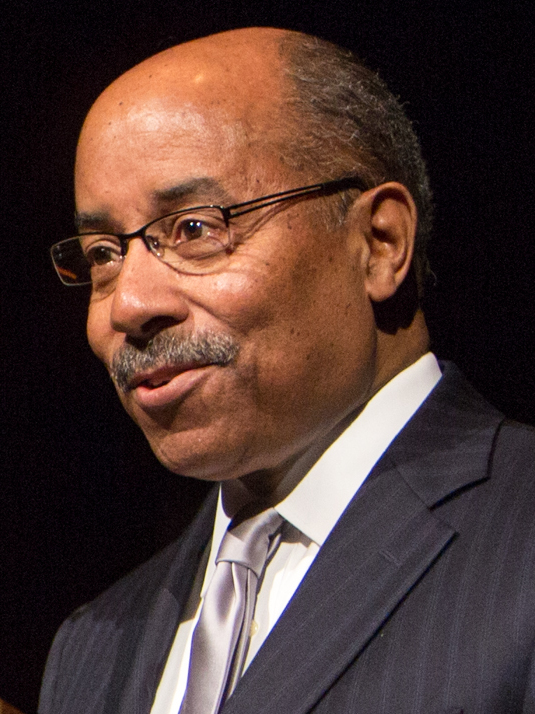
- Born: Edward Thomas Welburn Jr. December 14, 1950 (age 75); Philadelphia, Pennsylvania, U.S.
- Occupations: Automotive designer and executive
- Known for: Head of design at General Motors
- Predecessor: Wayne Cherry
- Successor: Michael Simcoe

Edward Thomas Welburn Jr. (born December 14, 1950) is an automobile designer and former General Motors' Vice President of Global Design, a role in which he served from 2003 to 2016 and the same position that Harley Earl and Bill Mitchell once held. To date, Welburn still holds the distinction of having been the highest-ranking Black-American in the global automotive industry. He has overseen the development of recent GM products, such as the Chevrolet Corvette, Cadillac Escalade and Chevrolet Camaro. Welburn has overseen groundbreaking concepts such as the Oldsmobile Aerotech, Cadillac Ciel, and Buick Avista.

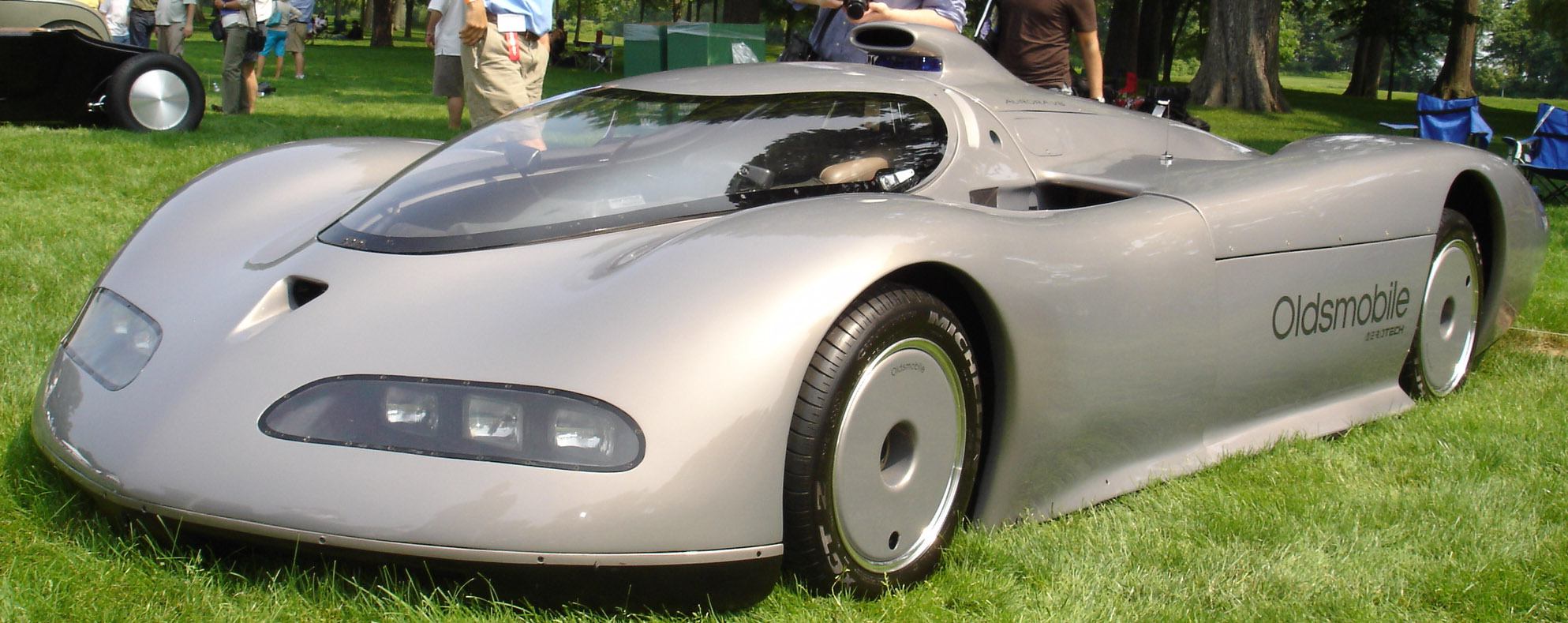
Oldsmobile Aerotech

Welburn was also the lead GM designer on the Chaparral 2X Vision GT, a concept car designed for the video game Gran Turismo 6. The car features 4-wheel steer and active aerodynamics, claimed to be similar to a wingsuit, and was made available in December 2014.

== Education ==
Welburn studied design, sculpture, and painting at Howard University’s School of Fine Arts in Washington, D.C. He communicated with General Motors during his years at Howard, which led to an internship at GM Design after his junior year in 1971. He earned his bachelor's degree from Howard in 1972 and was invited to return to his alma mater on May 7, 2016 to give a commencement speech to graduates of the College of Fine Arts.

== Career ==
Welburn's first peek behind the curtain of General Motors Design was during his college internship in 1971. One year later, he became the first Black American hired to design GM vehicles. He spent his entire design career at GM, where he worked in a variety of studios on a diverse list of vehicles, and he became the highest-ranking Black American in the automotive industry as the first-ever Vice President, GM Global Design — one of seven to have held the position, including Harley Earl, Bill Mitchell, Irv Rybicki, Chuck Jordan, Wayne Cherry, and Michael Simcoe.

His designs have set records for speed on racetracks and sales in the marketplace. Among many other notable vehicles, he designed multiple pace cars for the Indianapolis 500, and led the design of the presidential limo, commonly known as 'The Beast', for both Presidents Barack Obama and Donald Trump.

As the leader of GM Global Design, Welburn traveled the world attending auto shows and visiting his eleven design studios in seven countries, averaging 140,000 air miles each year.

Throughout his career, Welburn recognized a connection between fashion and automobile design. This kinship brought him to spearhead the creation of three automotive fashion shows; two in Detroit, and a third in Dubai. In these shows, GM's latest concept cars rolled down the runway alongside Hollywood and music industry celebrities wearing the latest fashions.

On April 7, 2016, he announced his retirement from General Motors after 44 years, effective July 1, 2016. He was succeeded by Michael Simcoe from GM Australia Design.

After announcing his retirement, he launched The Welburn Group, a design consultancy.

Welburn continues to advise GM Design on the development of their new design facility in Warren, MI.

== Film, Television, and Games ==
Welburn has enjoyed a long relationship with the film industry, with the goal being to ensure GM products are placed in key roles in feature films. He notes his relationship with director Michael Bay, Paramount Pictures, and The Transformers movies featuring the Bumblebee Camaro as having been the most satisfying. His work on this modern-day film franchise led to a speaking role in Transformers: Age of Extinction.

He has also appeared on several automotive TV programs, including AmeriCarna, Jay Leno's Garage, and the automotive reality series Motor City Masters, where his weekly role was that of the authority on design and brands.

In 2019, Ed founded Welburn Media Productions is currently serving as the executive producer of a major motion picture currently under development.

In 2022, Ed Welburn was featured in the video game Gran Turismo 7 where a virtual avatar representing him provides insights, commentary, and personal Anecdotes relating to GM products featured in the game.

== Charitable and Automotive Heritage Affiliations ==
Welburn serves an active role as a judge of classic cars at the Pebble Beach Concours d'Elegance, Amelia Island Concours d'Elegance, Hilton Head Island Motoring Festival & Concours d’Elegance, and The Peninsula Classic.

He also serves on the Board of Directors for the College for Creative Studies, America On Wheels, LeMay - America's Car Museum, and Tony Bennett’s Exploring the Arts.

In 2016, Welburn designed the new trophy for the North American Car of the Year award, which is on permanent display in the atrium of TCF Center in Detroit.

In 2026, Welburn served as the guest curator for the special exhibition For Gold & Glory, focused on Charlie Wiggins, a Black driver, mechanic, innovator, and race-car builder who won the Gold & Glory Sweepstakes four times.

== Personal life ==
Welburn comes from a close-knit family with roots in suburban Philadelphia. It was during a visit to the Philadelphia Auto Show as an 8-year-old that he decided he wanted a career in automotive design, and his mission to become an automotive designer for General Motors took on greater meaning when he wrote his first letter to GM at age 11. The company wrote back and recommended the steps he needed to take to achieve his dream.

In a July 7, 2016 interview with John McElroy on the program Autoline, Welburn stated that although officially retired, he has begun the process of writing an autobiography, in addition to having been asked by General Motors CEO Mary Barra to oversee a number of future General Motors products.

Ed has two adult children and two grandchildren.

== Awards ==
In 2014, Welburn's passion for fashion landed him on Hour Detroit’s annual Best Dressed list.

In 2016, General Motors dedicated its Center for African American Art at the Detroit Institute of Arts in Welburn's honor. The Detroit Free Press also honored him with its first-ever Difference Makers Lifetime Achievement Award, and most recently his body of work was turned over to the Smithsonian Institution museum, making him the first automobile designer to earn that distinction.

In 2017, Welburn was awarded an honorary Doctorate of Fine Arts by the College for Creative Studies, a leading design school, and he was inducted into the Automotive Hall of Fame, a recognition that he holds as his highest professional honor.

In 2018, he received the EyesOn Design Lifetime Design Achievement Award for his outstanding career in vehicle design.

In 2023, he won the Car Design News Lifetime Achievement Award.
