= Car Engineer of the Century =

International award

- Description: Most influential car engineer of the 20th century
- Location: Las Vegas, United States
- Country: International
- Presented by: Global Automotive Elections Foundation (GAEF)
- Winner: Ferdinand Porsche

The Car Engineer of the Century was an international award given to the most influential car engineer of the twentieth century. The election process was overseen by the Global Automotive Elections Foundation.

The winner, Dr. Ferdinand Porsche, was announced at an awards gala on December 18, 1999, in Las Vegas.

== The selection process ==
The process for deciding the Car Engineer of the Century started with the list of candidates below.

The candidates
Name	Notable for
Béla Barényi	Daimler-Benz passive safety work
Walter Owen Bentley	Innovative solutions
Karl Benz	Credited with creating the world's first purpose-built motor car in 1886
Marc Birkigt	Hispano-Suiza H6
Ettore Bugatti	Bugatti cars
Colin Chapman	Lotus Cars radical and innovative technical solutions
Gottlieb Daimler	Pioneer of internal-combustion engines
Rudolf Diesel	The diesel engine
William Edwards Deming	Revolutionised car production with statistical process control
Henry Ford I	Motor car pioneer, entrepreneur and industrial visionary
Dante Giacosa	Fiat innovator
Walter Hassan	Engine innovator at Coventry Climax and Jaguar
Nicolas Hayek	Father of the MCC Smart car concept.
Alec Issigonis	The innovative packaging of the Mini
Vittorio Jano	Motor car innovator
Spencer King	Conceived the luxury all wheel drive SUV concept with the Range Rover
Frederick Lanchester	Car pioneer founder of the Lanchester Motor Company
Hans Ledwinka	Pioneered an advanced backbone chassis configuration and paved the way for the Volkswagen Beetle with Tatra
André Lefèbvre	Citroën cars
Harry Mundy	Engine innovator with Coventry Climax, Lotus and Jaguar
August Otto	Credited with creating the first useful four stroke engine
Ferdinand Porsche	Automotive innovator and creator of Volkswagen.
Frederick Henry Royce	The engineering genius behind Rolls-Royce
Rudolf Uhlenhaut	Mercedes-Benz cars
Gabriel Voisin	Automotive and engine innovator
Felix Wankel	Perfected the rotary piston engine concept with NSU

The next step was for a jury of 132 professional automotive journalists, from 33 countries, under the presidency of Lord Montagu of Beaulieu, to reduce the list to 5, which they did, and the result was announced in November 1999. Finally the 5 were ranked by the jury and the overall winner was selected.

== See also ==
- Automotive engineer
- List of motor vehicle awards
- Car of the Century
- Car Designer of the Century
- Car Entrepreneur of the Century
- Car Executive of the Century

== Notes ==
-->
