= Wayne Cherry =

Car designer

- Wayne K. Cherry during his employment with General Motors
- Born: Wayne Kent Cherry; 1937 (age 88–89); Indianapolis, Indiana, U.S.
- Education: Art Center College of Design
- Occupation: Car designer
- Years active: 1962-2004
- Employer: General Motors
- Known for: General Motors Vice President of Design (1992-2004)
- Predecessor: Chuck Jordan
- Successor: Ed Welburn

Wayne Kent Cherry (born 1937) is an American car designer educated at Art Center College of Design and employed by General Motors from 1962 through 2004, retiring as Vice President of Design. Cherry worked for General Motors in the United States from 1962 until 1965, when he moved to the United Kingdom to take a position with General Motors' Vauxhall Motors subsidiary, becoming Design Director at Vauxhall in 1975. In 1983, General Motors consolidated all European passenger car design under Cherry and made him Design Director at General Motors' Adam Opel AG subsidiary. Cherry returned to the United States in 1991 and in 1992 became General Motors Vice President of Design. Cherry retired from General Motors in 2004.

Cherry was one of twenty-five nominees for the 1999 Car Designer of the Century.

== Education ==
In the 1950s, Cherry read an article about the Art Center College of Design and wrote to the college, asking how to become a car designer. The college replied, telling Cherry to submit a portfolio. Cherry submitted a portfolio that included sketches of cars and engines and was accepted to the college. Cherry graduated with a bachelor's degree in industrial and transportation design in early 1962.

== Career ==
Cherry joined General Motors in 1962 after graduating from the Art Center College of Design, initially working at General Motors in the US as an Associate Creative Designer. Cherry was a member of the team that designed the original Chevrolet Camaro/Pontiac Firebird and the team that designed the 1966 Oldsmobile Toronado.

In 1965, Cherry transferred to General Motors' United Kingdom-based Vauxhall Motors subsidiary. His first project was in 1965 under Assistant Director of Design Leo Pruneau working on the Vauxhall XVR concept car. became Assistant Design Director at Vauxhall in 1970. In that same year, the Vauxhall SRV concept car was shown. Under Cherry, General Motors released the redesigned 1973 Vauxhall Firenza with its aerodynamic "droopsnoot". Cherry became the Design Director for Vauxhall in 1975.

In 1983, General Motors consolidated the design activities of its Vauxhall and Opel subsidiaries. As part of the consolidation plan, Cherry became Design Director at General Motors' Rüsselsheim, Germany-based Adam Opel AG subsidiary and became responsible for overall design of passenger cars in Europe. During his time at Opel, Cherry supervised the design of the Astra, Corsa, Calibra, Tigra, among many others.

Cherry returned to the United States in 1991 to direct the design studios of General Motors' Chevrolet and Geo divisions. In 1992, Cherry became Vice President of Design for General Motors worldwide, one of seven to have held the position, including Harley Earl, Bill Mitchell, Irv Rybicki, Chuck Jordan, Ed Welburn and Michael Simcoe.

While Cherry Vice President of Design, he oversaw the designs of the Pontiac Solstice, Cadillac Sixteen concept car, Hummer H2, Chevrolet SSR, and many other vehicles, including the Cadillac CTS introduced in 2002.

Cherry retired from General Motors on January 1, 2004.

== Automobiles designed ==
As Design Director at Vauxhall & Opel:

- 1975-1981 Vauxhall Cavalier Mark I (front end only)
- 1978 Vauxhall Equus concept
- 1984-1998 Opel Kadett E
- 1988-1995 Vauxhall Cavalier Mark III/Opel Vectra A
- 1989-1997 Vauxhall/Opel Calibra (with Erhard Schnell)
- 1994-1999 Opel Omega B1 (with Herbert Kilmer)

As Vice President of Design for GM:

- 1995-1999 Chevrolet Tahoe
- 1995-1999 GMC Yukon
- 1999-2007 Chevrolet Silverado
- 1999-2007 GMC Sierra
- 2000-2005 Chevrolet Monte Carlo
- 2000-2006 Chevrolet Suburban
- 2000-2006 GMC Yukon XL
- 2000-2006 Chevrolet Tahoe
- 2000-2006 GMC Yukon
- 2003-2006 Chevrolet SSR
- 2007-2014 Chevrolet Silverado
- 2007-2014 GMC Sierra
- 2007-2014 Chevrolet Suburban
- 2007-2014 GMC Yukon XL
- 2007-2014 Chevrolet Tahoe
- 2007-2014 GMC Yukon
- 2002-2009 Hummer H2 (oversaw design)
- 1996-1999 Pontiac Bonneville (Note: Cherry designed the facelifted Bonneville for the 1996-1999 model years.)
- 2000-2005 Pontiac Bonneville
- 2006-2010 Pontiac Solstice
- 1997-2004 Buick Regal
- 1997-2005 Buick Century
- 1997-2003 Chevrolet Malibu
- 1999-2000 Cadillac Escalade
- 2000-2005 Cadillac DeVille
- 2002-2006 Cadillac Escalade
- 2003-2007 Cadillac CTS
- 2004-2005 Chevrolet Classic (fleet sales only)
- 2003 Cadillac Sixteen concept car

== Awards ==
The 1993 Opel Corsa received 20 international design awards. In 1999, the Global Automotive Elections Foundation nominated Cherry to a group of twenty-five designers competing for Car Designer of the Century. In June 2013, Cherry received a Lifetime Achievement Award from the Detroit Institute of Ophthalmology.
