= Vauxhall Firenza =

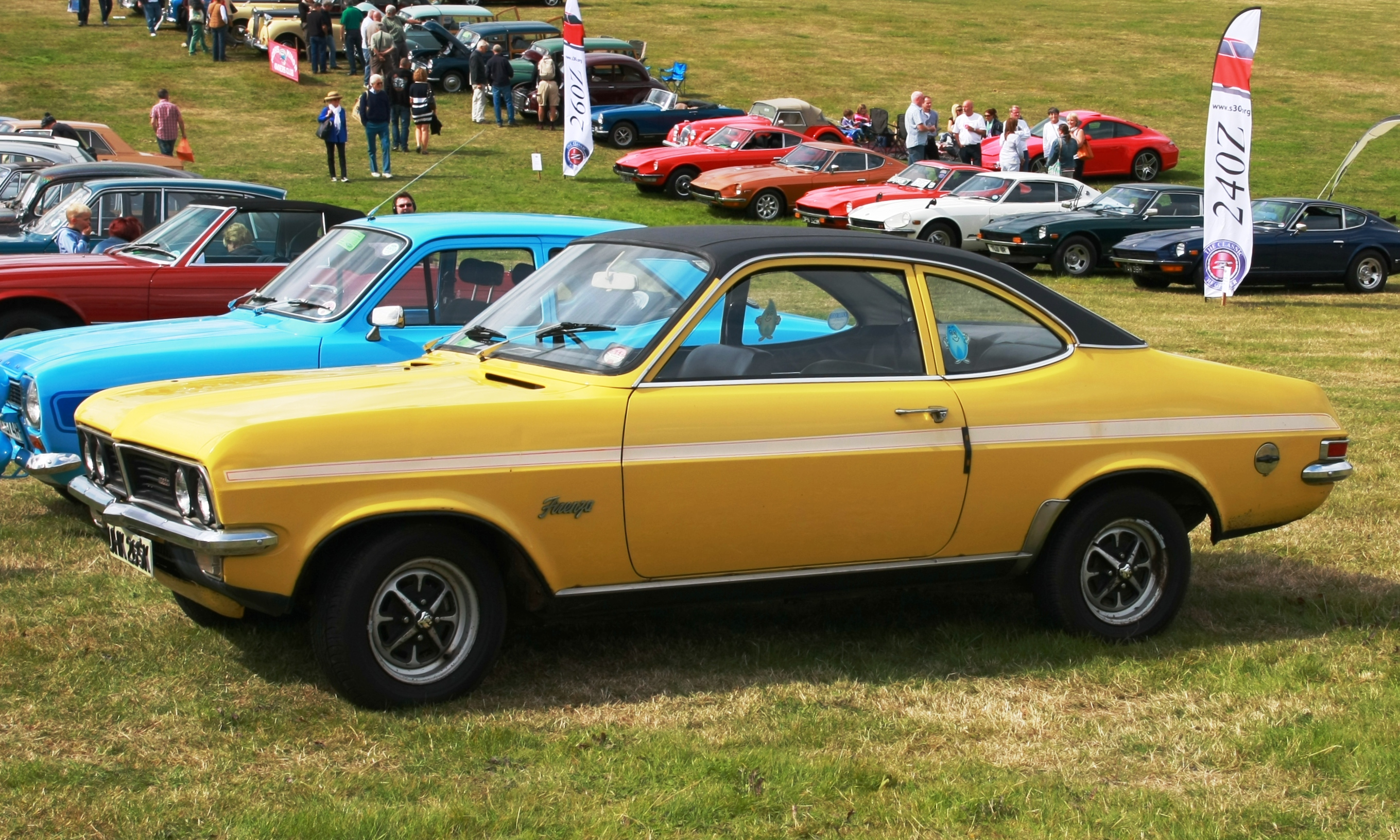

Overview
- Manufacturer: Vauxhall (General Motors)
- Also called: Pontiac Firenza SL (Canada); Chevrolet Firenza (South Africa); Chevrolet 1300/1900 (South Africa); Chevrolet Hatch (South Africa)
- Production: 1970 – 1975
- Assembly: Ellesmere Port, Cheshire, England; Port Elizabeth, South Africa

Body and chassis
- Class: Compact car (C)
- Body style: 2-door coupé 3-door wagon
- Related: Vauxhall Viva

Powertrain
- Engine: 1971: 1159 cc ohv I4; 1599 cc ohc I4; 1975 cc ohc I4; 1972–1975: 1256 cc ohv I4; 1759 cc ohc I4; 2279 cc ohc I4
- Transmission: 4-speed manual all-synchromesh, 5-speed ZF dog-leg manual all-synchromesh on HP Firenza

Chronology
- Successor: Opel Manta

The Firenza is a model of car offered by Vauxhall from May 1971 until 1975. It was a development of the Viva, but had a distinctive coupé body style (fastback) and only two doors. In South Africa, it was sold as the Chevrolet Firenza until it was replaced by the Chevrolet 1300/1900 during 1975. Its name is derived from Firenze, the name of the Italian city known in English as Florence.

== History ==
Launched in May 1971, the initial Firenza was available in a base model 1159 cc overhead valve engine carried over from the Viva HB, and two models with the Slant-4 overhead camshaft engine from the Victor FD, in 1599 cc and 1975 cc variants. The latter was the same engine as used in the earlier Viva GT. The entry 1159 cc lasted 3 months before the 1256 cc was launched in August 1971, being produced until July 1972 before the smaller engine was dropped from the range. Some six months after launch, in December 1971, performance was boosted when the engine capacities were enlarged to 1759 cc and 2279 cc respectively. These engine models started production in March 1972 through to September 1973. All models had a front-mounted four-cylinder engine driving the rear wheels. The SL model in each engine size carried the highest level of trim.

Suspension was by double wishbone and coil springs at the front, and a live rear axle with trailing arms and coils at the rear. The suspension and steering of the Firenza was adapted for use in the Jensen-Healey sports car.

The model changes in early 1972 included the introduction of a top-of-the-line 2300 Sport SL model (introduced at the Geneva Motor Show), using the 2279 cc engine. The 2300 Sport SL was the only version to feature the seven dial dash (speedometer, clock, rev counter, fuel, oil pressure, water temp, & battery charge). The engine was an inclined four-cylinder with single overhead camshaft and twin Stromberg carburettors, producing 122 bhp (91 kW). The oversquare straight four engine was renowned for its big torque curve, making the car very flexible and easy to drive. The interior was equipped with bucket seats, front and back, to carry four persons. The centre console with heater controls and warning lights was quite distinctive and luxurious for the time.

The 2300 Sport SL was raced by the Dealer Team Vauxhall, following their successes with the Viva GT. In Castrol colours, these cars enjoyed many successes.

== High Performance Firenza ==
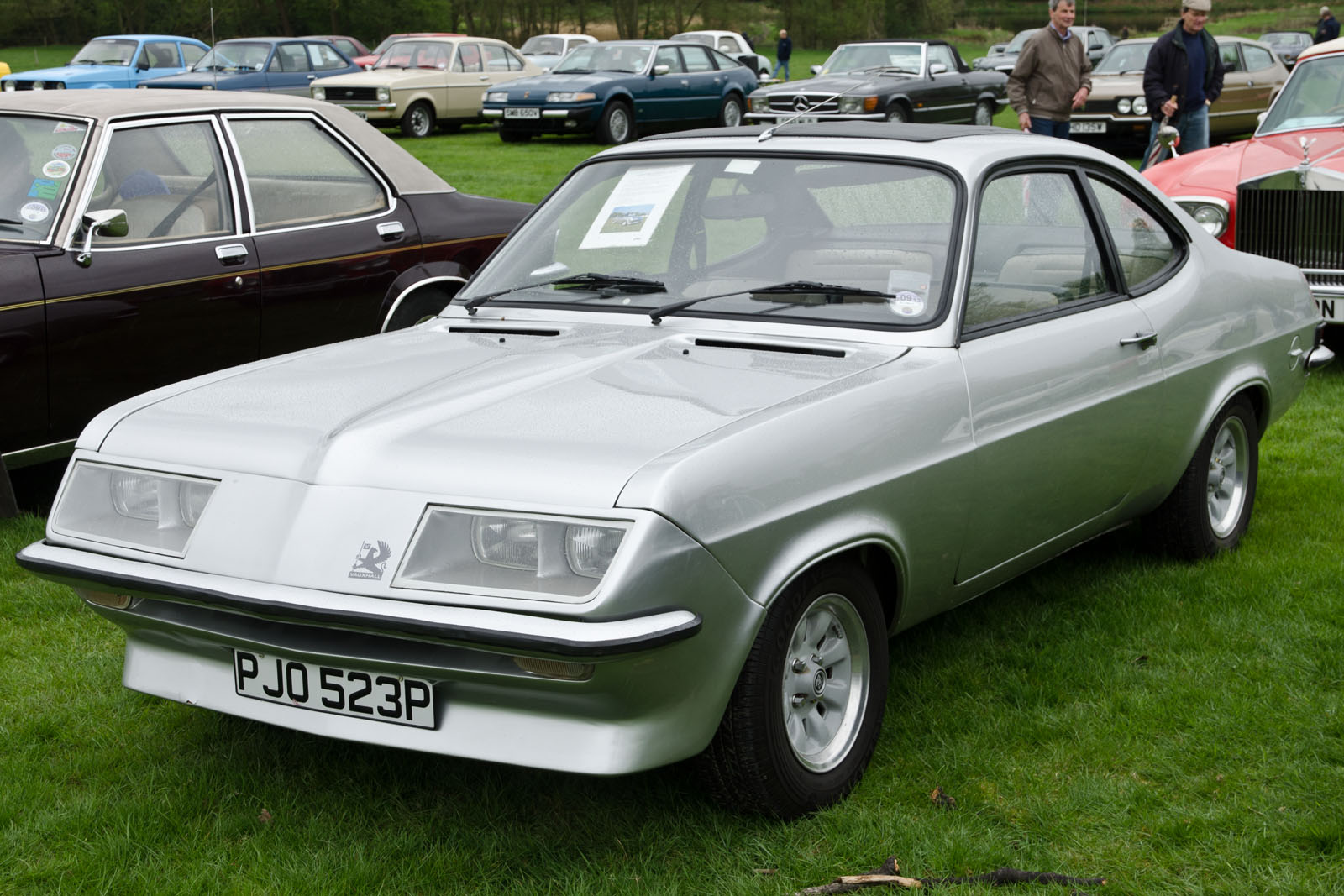
1976 Vauxhall Firenza "Droopsnoot", standard road-going version

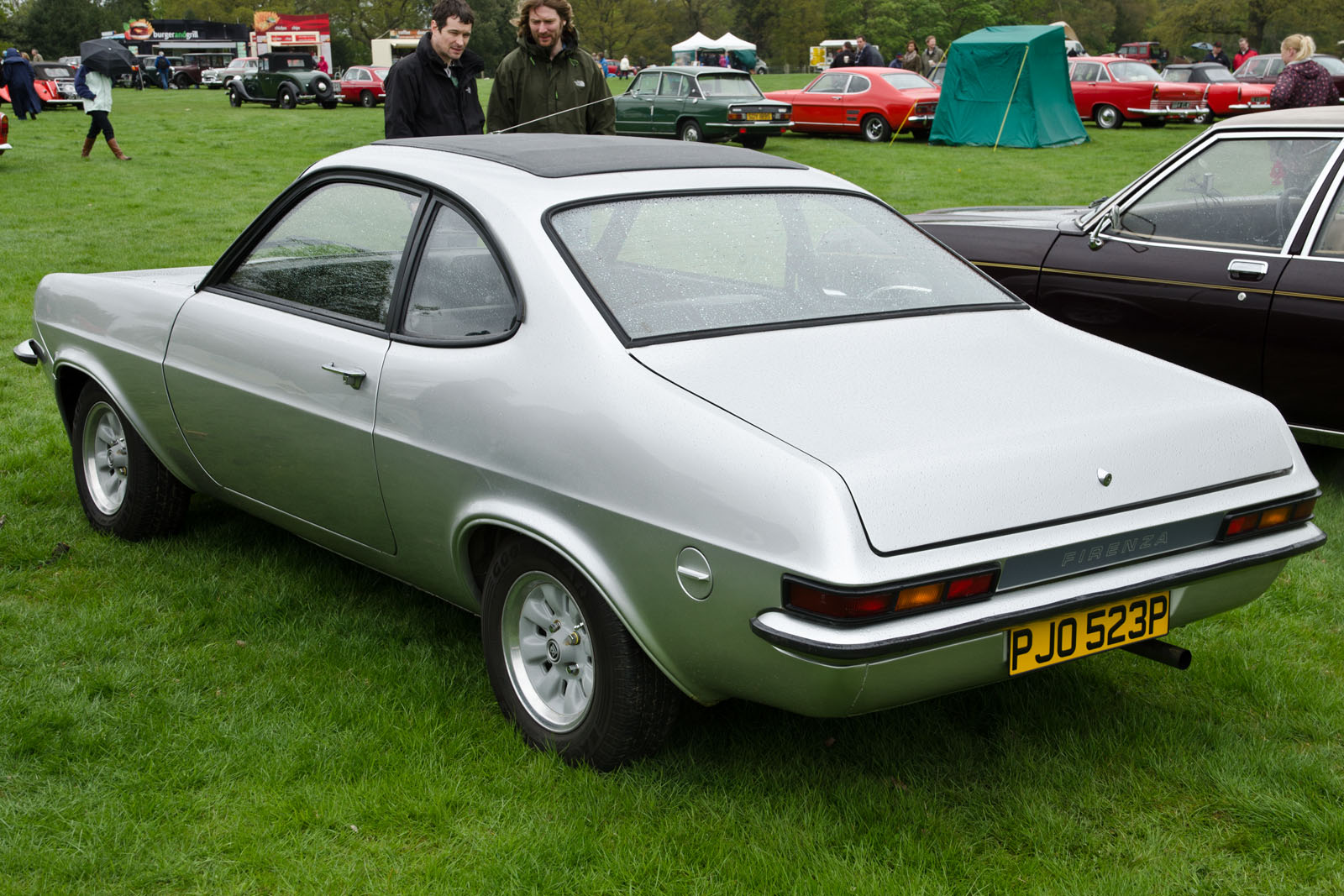
1976 Vauxhall Firenza "Droopsnoot" rear end

In 1973, Vauxhall developed a restyled version of the Firenza, known officially as the High Performance (HP) Firenza, but known colloquially as the "droopsnoot" after its distinct aerodynamic nose. The nose was moulded from GRP, and featured two pairs of Cibié headlamps behind toughened glass covers. The overall look was somewhat reminiscent of the Renault Alpine A310, and used the same headlamp units. Several prototypes of the HP Firenza were considered with different types of front end treatment, requiring different degrees of change from the standard production front end, including cars known as Black Knight and Daytona, the latter for its resemblance to the Ferrari Daytona, a favourite of Wayne Cherry.

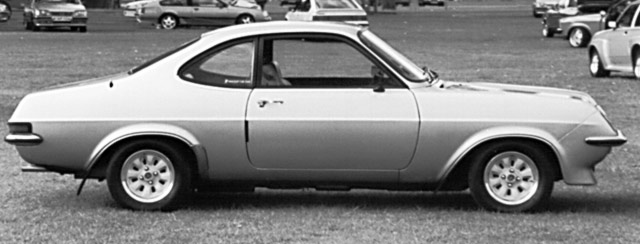
HPF in side view shows off coupé bodyshell style

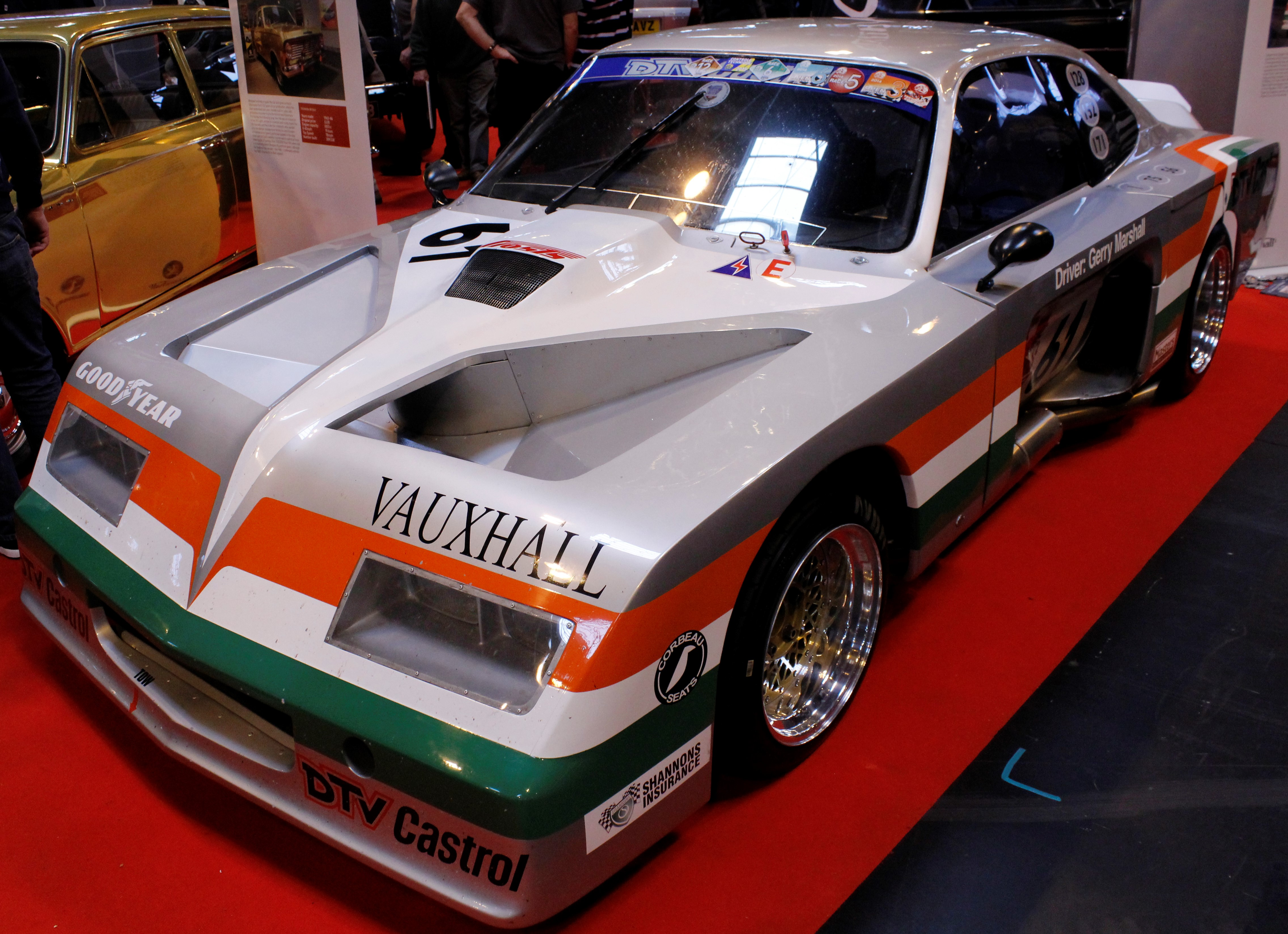
Vauxhall Firenza "Baby Bertha" Super Saloon race car.

At that time, the original flat-fronted Firenza model was rebadged as the Magnum coupé, and the name Firenza was used exclusively for the HP version. This car was an exciting styling departure for Vauxhall, and certainly created something of a buzz. The engine was the 2.3-litre variant of the OHC Slant Four engine, uprated to a very torquey 131 bhp (98 kW) using a variety of parts developed by Blydenstein Racing. It had twin 175 Stromberg carburettors, high-lift camshaft and free-flow tubular exhaust manifold. The car was restyled on the David Jones original by American designer Wayne Cherry and the result was an exceptionally low drag coefficient for its time. Suspension was uprated and lowered, brakes uprated, and a 5-speed ZF dog leg gearbox was installed, a much stronger unit than fitted to the standard model (though rather noisy). Another unusual feature of the car was the alloy Avon Safety Wheels, which were designed to retain the tyre safely in the event of a puncture. This was the first car to use these wheels in production. All production cars were painted in the same colour – Silver Starfire, and featured a largely black interior with silver-grey cloth seats. An unusual interior feature of dubious utility was the passenger grab handle on the dash in place of the standard glovebox.

The car was launched to much publicity in a special one-off race at Thruxton circuit in Hampshire, with top drivers of the day taking part including Gerry Marshall and Barry "Whizzo" Williams, who won the race. However, the fuel crisis of the time meant that suddenly it became very hard to sell gas-guzzling cars like this (even though the aerodynamics increased fuel economy greatly, reducing the power needed to attain its top speed by some 30 hp), and coupled with some production line difficulties in actually building the car meant that sales and delivery were slow, and eventually just 204 examples were built, far short of the 30,000 projected. This very low volume was a disaster for Vauxhall, but it has led to the car becoming a very collectible classic.

The sports market share at the time was 20,000 cars per annum, projected sales were never high, after the project was cancelled the 200 spare nosecones and wheels were fitted to the estate Sports Hatch and 1000 body shells sold as Viva E coupe.

The Firenza was also very successful in saloon car racing in the 1970s, especially in its Old Nail (with 2.3-litre inline-4 engine developed by Blydenstein Racing) and Repco-Holden 5-litre V8 engined Baby Bertha versions, piloted to great effect by Gerry Marshall.

Despite the low production run, the aerodynamic qualities and styling of the "droopsnoot" were incorporated, with improved productionisation, into most of Vauxhall's remaining 1970s new models: the Chevette, Cavalier and Carlton. The Firenza can be seen as a styling prototype for these models. Its influence can be judged from the fact that Ford adopted a very similar look for its Mk II RS2000 Escort and the 1982 Ford Sierra, which in turn were widely copied throughout the 1980s by others. For this reason, the HPF looks far less dated than many of its contemporaries.

== Chevrolet Firenza ==
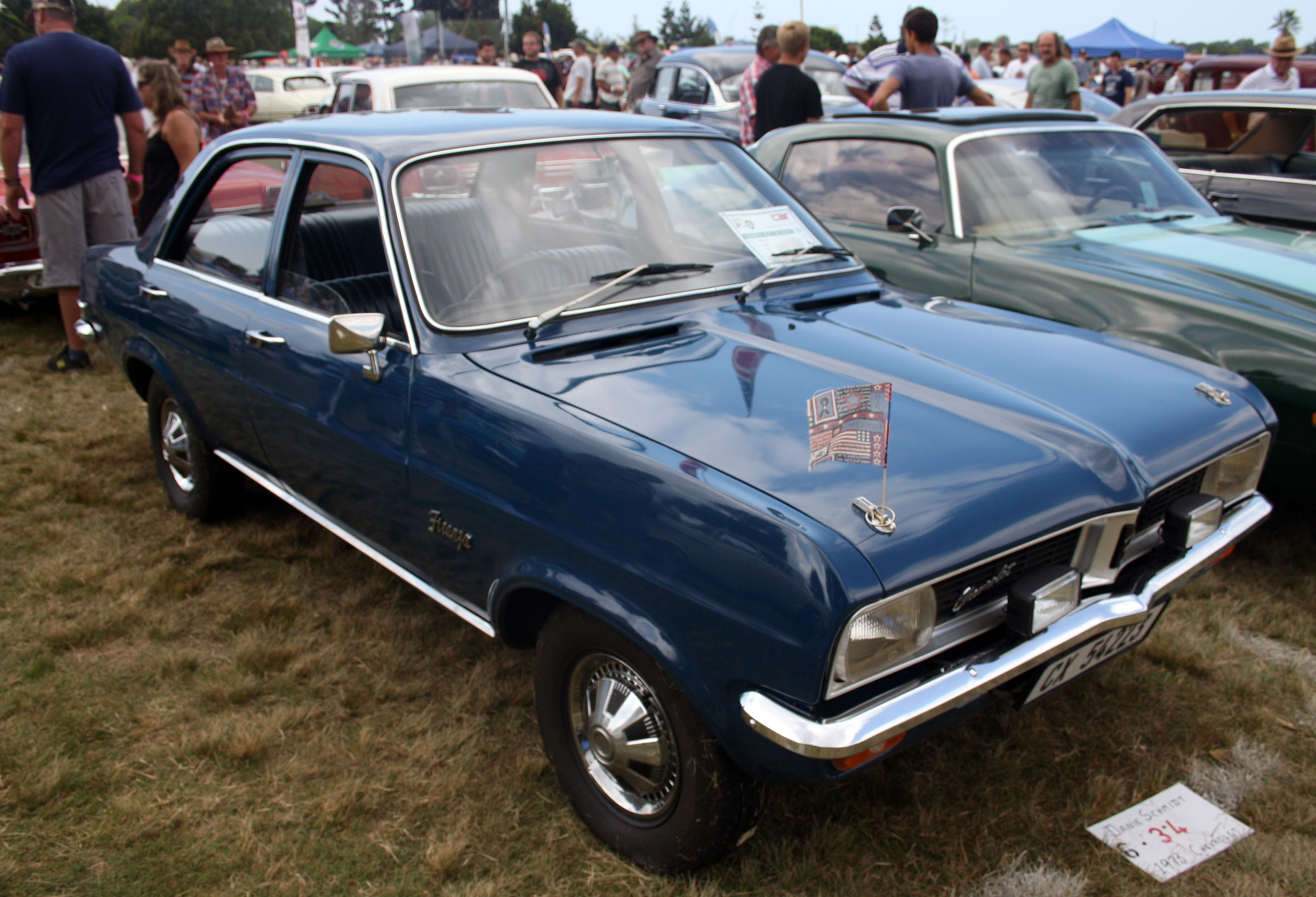
1973 Chevrolet Firenza

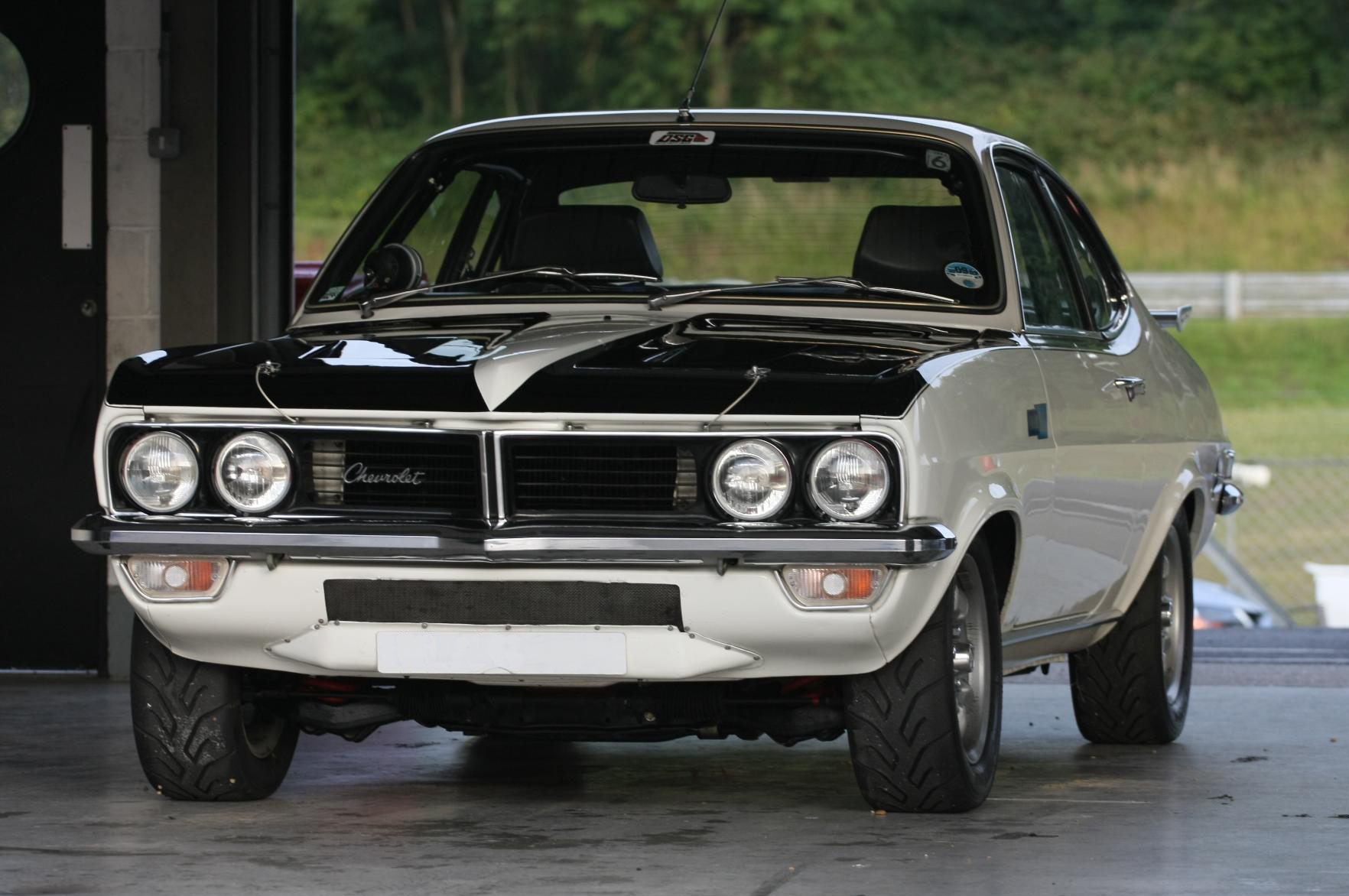
Chevrolet Firenza Can Am

In South Africa, the local GM subsidiary built the Viva two-door and four-door saloons as the Chevrolet Firenza from January 1971. A 1159 cc Vauxhall engine or a 2.5-litre Chevrolet inline-four, both locally made, were fitted. Two- or four-door saloons, a two-door coupé (2.5 only) and a three-door estate were available from the beginning. From 1973, the 1200 was replaced by the larger 1256 cc version. In 1974 the estate and coupé models were dropped. By 1975 only the de Luxe and SL models remained, with the two-door saloon only as a 1.3 de Luxe. The 2.5 was also available with an automatic transmission. The 2.5 SL received twin round headlamps, while the 1300 had single rectangular units. Firenza production ended in July 1975, with sales continuing at a trickle thereafter.

A limited-edition version of the Firenza was built in South Africa known as the Chevrolet Can-Am (or the Little Chev) by South Africans using the 5-litre (302ci) V8 from the 1969 Chevrolet Camaro Z/28. In order for the car to qualify for racing, 100 had to be sold to the public, so only 100 were built.

In 1975, the Firenza was renamed the Chevrolet 1300/1900. This was facelifted with large square front grille as well as a revised bumper and bonnet. A hatchback version of the Firenza, known as the Chevrolet Hatch, was also introduced. This featured the tailgate and rear lights from the T-Car Vauxhall Chevette/Opel Kadett, which was not sold in South Africa. The Chevrolet Hatch was dropped in 1978.
