= Béla Barényi =

Hungarian engineer and inventor (1907–1997)

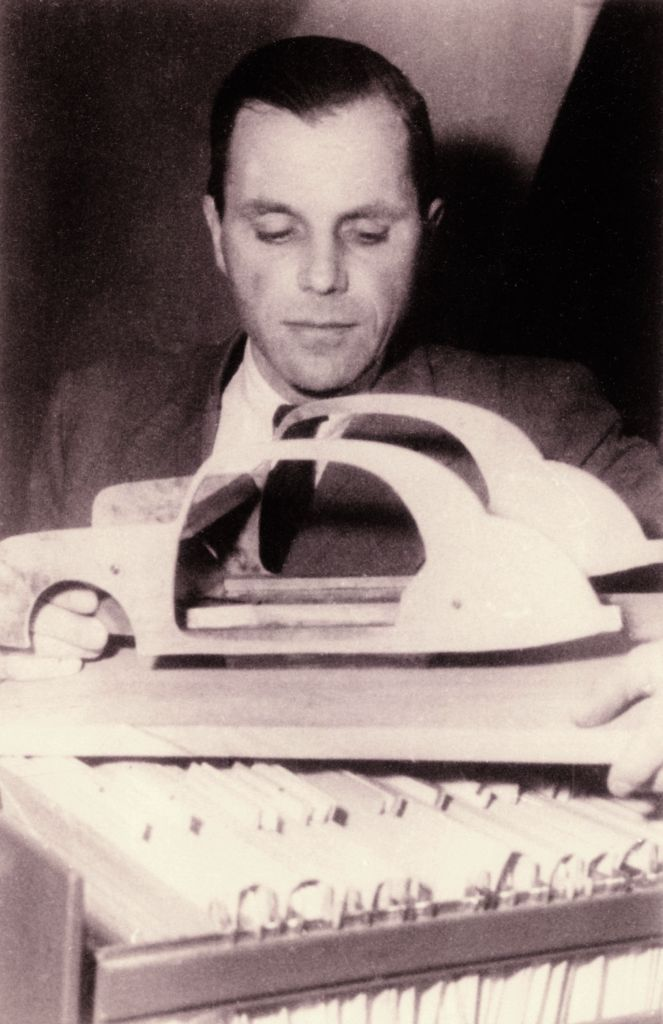
- Born: 1 March 1907; Hirtenberg, Cisleithania, Austria-Hungary
- Died: 30 May 1997 (aged 90); Boeblingen, Germany
- Education: Privatfachschule für Maschinenbau und Elektrotechnik, Vienna, Austria
- Occupations: Engineer, inventor
- Known for: Crumple zone
- Relatives: Friedrich Barényi (aviation pioneer) – brother Fridolin Keller (industrialist) – grandfather Seraphin Keller (industrialist) – great-grandfather

Béla Barényi (1 March 1907, Hirtenberg, Austro-Hungarian Monarchy – 30 May 1997, Böblingen, Germany) was an ethnic Hungarian engineer from Austria-Hungary, who was a prolific inventor, sometimes even compared to Thomas Edison. Barényi made numerous crash protection inventions, and is therefore regarded as the father of passive safety in automotive design. "The lives of thousands of people have probably been saved thanks to Barényi's work."

Barényi is also credited with first conceiving the original design for the German people's car (the Volkswagen Beetle) in 1925, – notably by Mercedes-Benz, on their website, including his original technical drawing, – five years before Ferdinand Porsche claimed to have made his initial version.

Barényi was inducted into the Detroit Automotive Hall of Fame in 1994, and nominated for the award of Car Engineer of the Century in 1999.

Barényi died in Böblingen, Germany in 1997. A Mercedes advertisement featuring Barényi's image stated: "No one in the world has given more thought to car safety than this man." Béla Barényi left a broad record of his inventions to the Technisches Museum Wien in Vienna.

== Biography ==
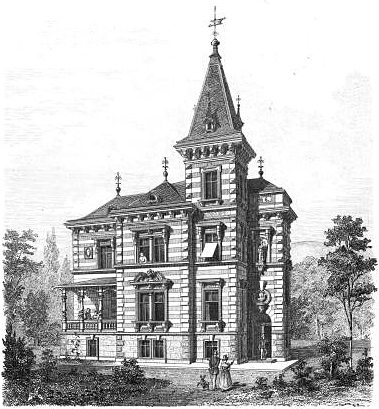
Barényi's birth house, the villa of the Austrian industrial magnates of the Keller family into which Barényi was born

Barényi was born in Hirtenberg near Vienna, Austria during the Austro-Hungarian Empire, of Hungarian and Austrian heritage, from his father's and mother's side, respectively. His father Jenő Barényi (1866–1917) was a Hungarian military officer, a teacher at the military academy at Pozsony, a former Hungarian capital (known in German as Pressburg, now more commonly as Bratislava since the creation of Czechoslovakia following World War I and the Treaty of Trianon).

After mechanical and electrical engineering studies at the Vienna college in 1926, he was employed by various Austrian automobile companies: Austro-Daimler, Steyr and Adler automobile companies before joining Daimler-Benz in 1939. Dr Wilhelm Haspel, a member of the board of management was won over by Barényi's conviction during his job interview. Barényi explained in detail how conventional steering system, steering column and wheel, suspension and car body design should, in his opinion, all be changed in order to enhance safety for the car's occupants. Haspel hired Barényi, justifying his decision by saying, "A company like Daimler-Benz can't afford to live hand to mouth. Mr Barényi, you are thinking 15 to 20 years ahead. In Sindelfingen you’ll be working in a world apart. Whatever you invent will go directly to the patent department." Barényi was appointed straight as head of the pre-development department of Daimler-Benz, a position he kept from 1939 to 1972, where he continued to be a prolific inventor.

== Patents and inventions ==
There have been claims that, when he retired on 31 December 1972, Barényi had more than 2000 patents, twice as many as Thomas Edison; and claims that he had over 2,500 patents by 2009. However, the claims include patents filed in multiple countries for the same invention. Barényi's patent count documented at the European Patent Office is 1,244 worldwide with 595 of those filed in Germany, the primary filing country of his primary employer.

Barényi developed the concept of the crumple zone that he first came up with in 1937, the non-deformable passenger cell, collapsible steering column, safer detachable hardtops and other Mercedes-Benz innovations, many features which were subsequently broadly adopted in automobiles.

== Crush zones and the non-deformable passenger cell ==
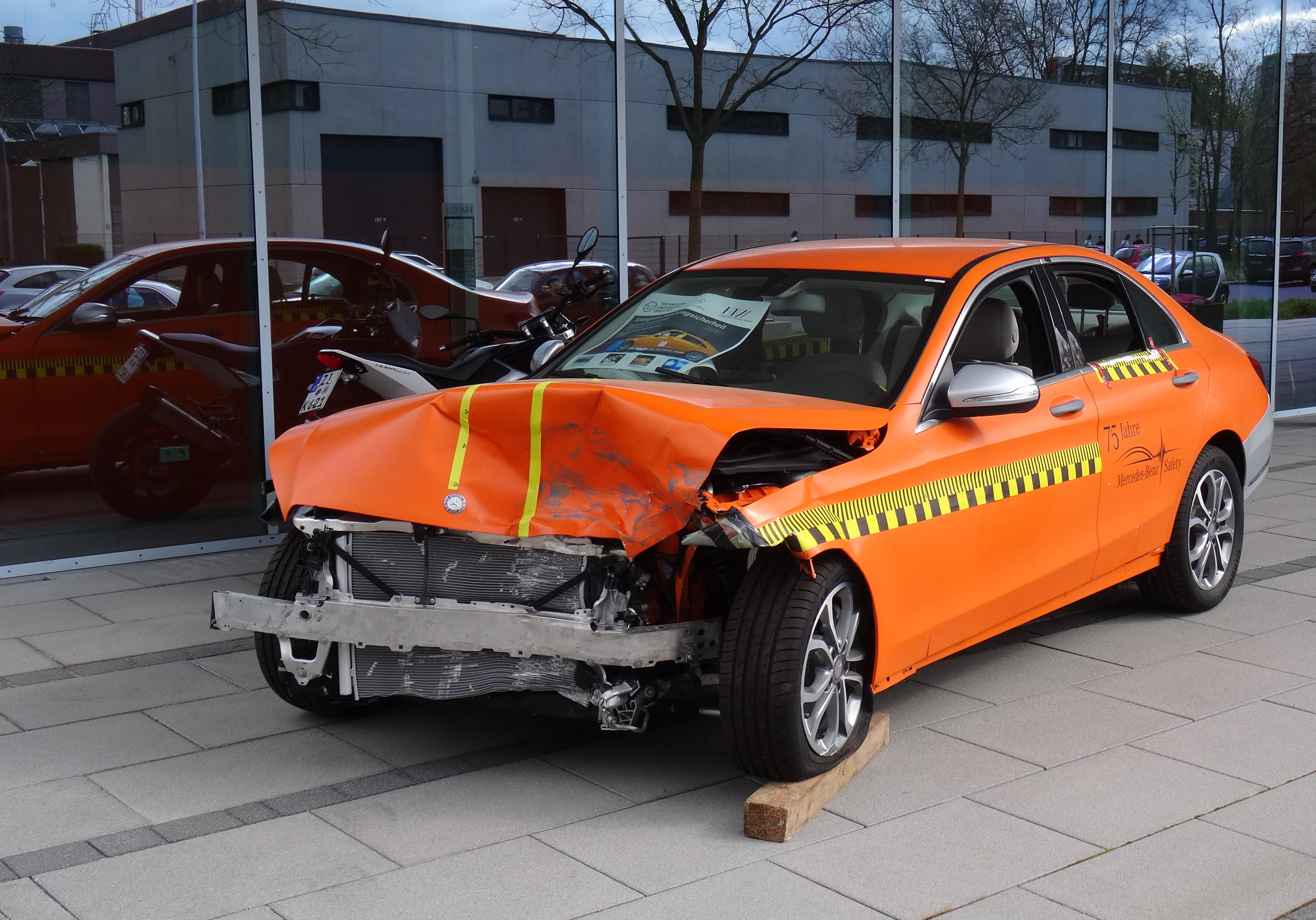
A crash-tested Mercedes-Benz

The crumple zone concept was originally invented and patented by Barényi in 1937, before he worked for Mercedes-Benz; and subsequently in a more developed form in 1952. The 1953 Mercedes-Benz "Ponton" was a partial implementation of his ideas, by having a strong deep platform to form a partial safety cell, patented in 1941.

The Mercedes-Benz patent number 854157, granted in 1952, describes the decisive feature of passive safety. Barényi questioned the opinion prevailing until then, that a safe car had to be rigid. He divided the car body into three sections: the rigid non-deforming passenger compartment and the crumple zones in the front and the rear. They are designed to absorb the energy of an impact (kinetic energy) by deformation during collision.

The first Mercedes-Benz car body developed using this patent was the 1959 Mercedes W111 "Tail Fin" Saloon. The safety cell and crumple zones were achieved primarily by the design of the longitudinal members: these were straight in the centre of the vehicle and formed a rigid safety cage with the body panels, the front and rear supports were curved so they deformed in the event of an accident, absorbing part of the collision energy and preventing the full force of the impact from reaching the occupants.

A more recent development was for these curved longitudinal members is to be weakened by vertical and lateral ribs to form telescoping "crash can" or "crush tube" deformation structures.

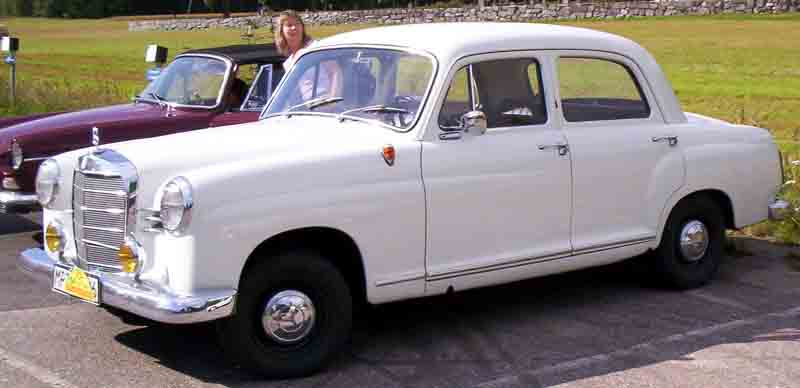
The 1953 Mercedes 180 'Ponton' was the first to include the basic Barényi "three-box" design concept, wherein the central passenger-cell is more rigid than the car's nose and tail "boxes".

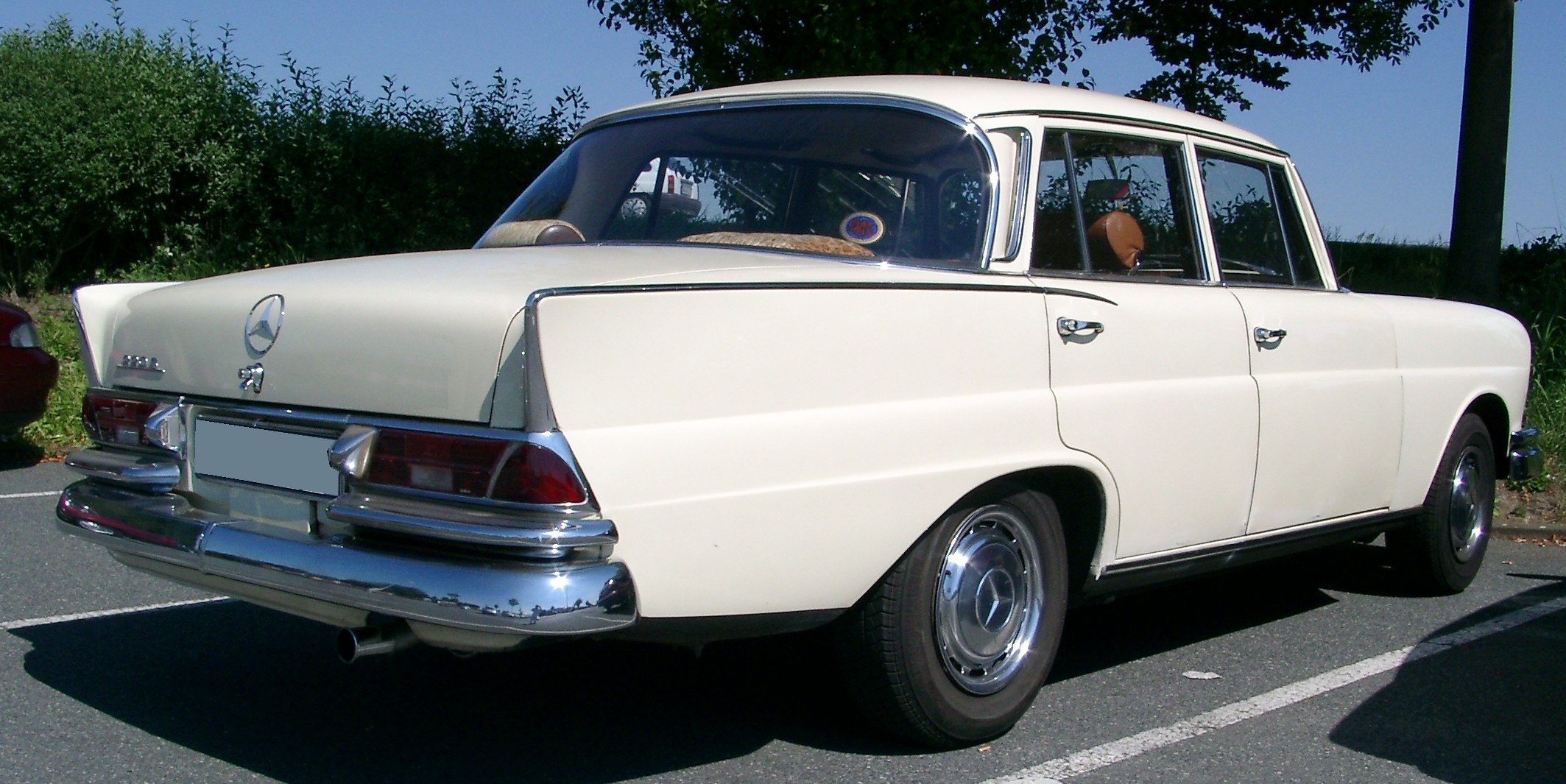
The first Mercedes-Benz fully using the crumple zone patents was the 1959 W111 “Tail Fin” Saloon.

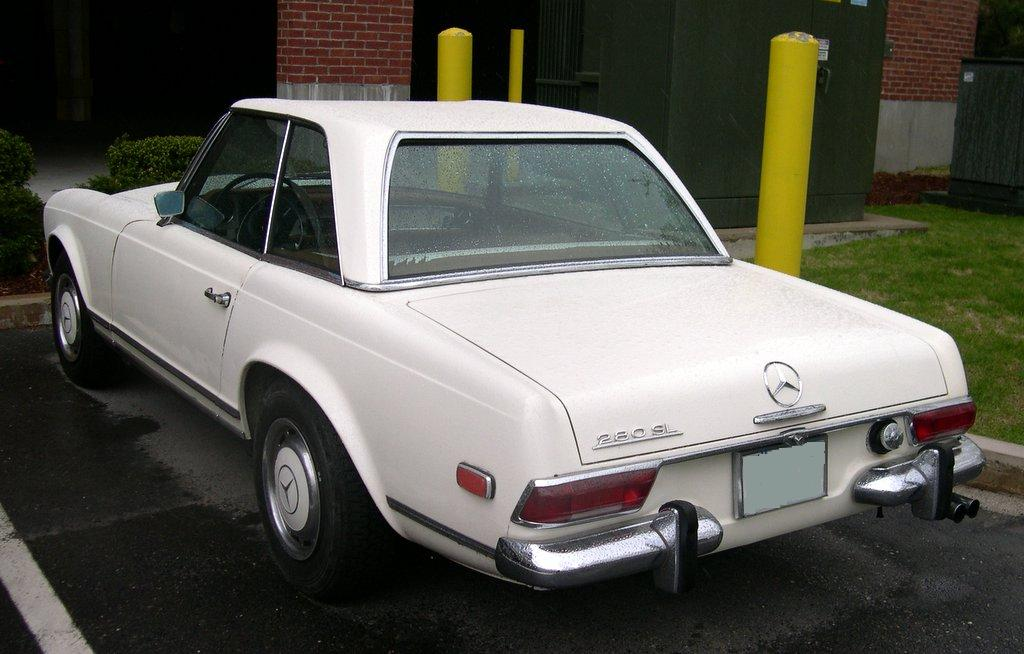
Barényi gave the 'Pagoda' hardtop for 1963-71's Mercedes SL thick side pillars, to fortify the roof in a rollover.

== See also ==
- Colonel John Paul Stapp – a prolific U.S. researcher, who greatly contributed to developing seat belts.
