= Michael Simcoe =

Business leader

- Born: 1959–1960; Australia
- Education: Royal Melbourne Institute of Technology (RMIT)
- Occupation: Automotive designer
- Years active: 1983–2025
- Employer: General Motors
- Known for: General Motors Vice President of Global Design (2016–2025)
- Predecessor: Ed Welburn
- Successor: Bryan Nesbitt

Michael "Mike" Simcoe (born c. 1959–1960) is an automobile designer from Melbourne, Australia. He most recently served as General Motors' Vice President of Global Design.

Simcoe received an Associate Diploma of Art Industrial Design from the Royal Melbourne Institute of Technology. He joined GM Holden as a designer in 1983, and was subsequently promoted to senior designer and chief designer in 1985 and 1987 respectively. In 1995, he became director of Design for GM Asia Pacific, overlooking collaborative projects with Daewoo, Suzuki, Fuji Heavy Industries and Isuzu. He was appointed director of Design at GM Holden in 2001, and later executive director of Asia Pacific Design in 2003, establishing GM Korea Design Operations. He was also Executive Director North American Exterior Design and Global Architecture Strategy starting from 2004, supervising various designs such as the Buick LaCrosse, Cadillac CTS and Chevrolet Camaro. The most recent position he held before becoming Vice President of Global Design was being the executive director of General Motors International Operations Design from in 2011.

Following Ed Welburn's announcement on April 8, 2016, that he would retire after 44 years at General Motors, Simcoe received the position of Vice President of Global Design, effective July 1, 2016. He was Vice President of Design for General Motors from 1986 to 1992, one of seven to have held the position, including Harley Earl, Bill Mitchell, Irv Rybicki, Chuck Jordan, Wayne Cherry and Ed Welburn.

Simcoe stepped down from his vice presidency role at GM on 1 July 2025; he was replaced by Bryan Nesbitt.

== Notable designs ==
- Schuppan 962CR (1992)
- Holden Coupe concept (1998)
- Holden Commodore (VX) (2000)
- Holden Caprice/Statesman (WH) (2000)
- Holden Monaro (2001)
- Holden Commodore (VE) (2006)
- Holden Caprice (WM) (2006)
- Buick Avenir (2015)
- Chevrolet Bolt concept (2015)
