= Avon Safety Wheel =

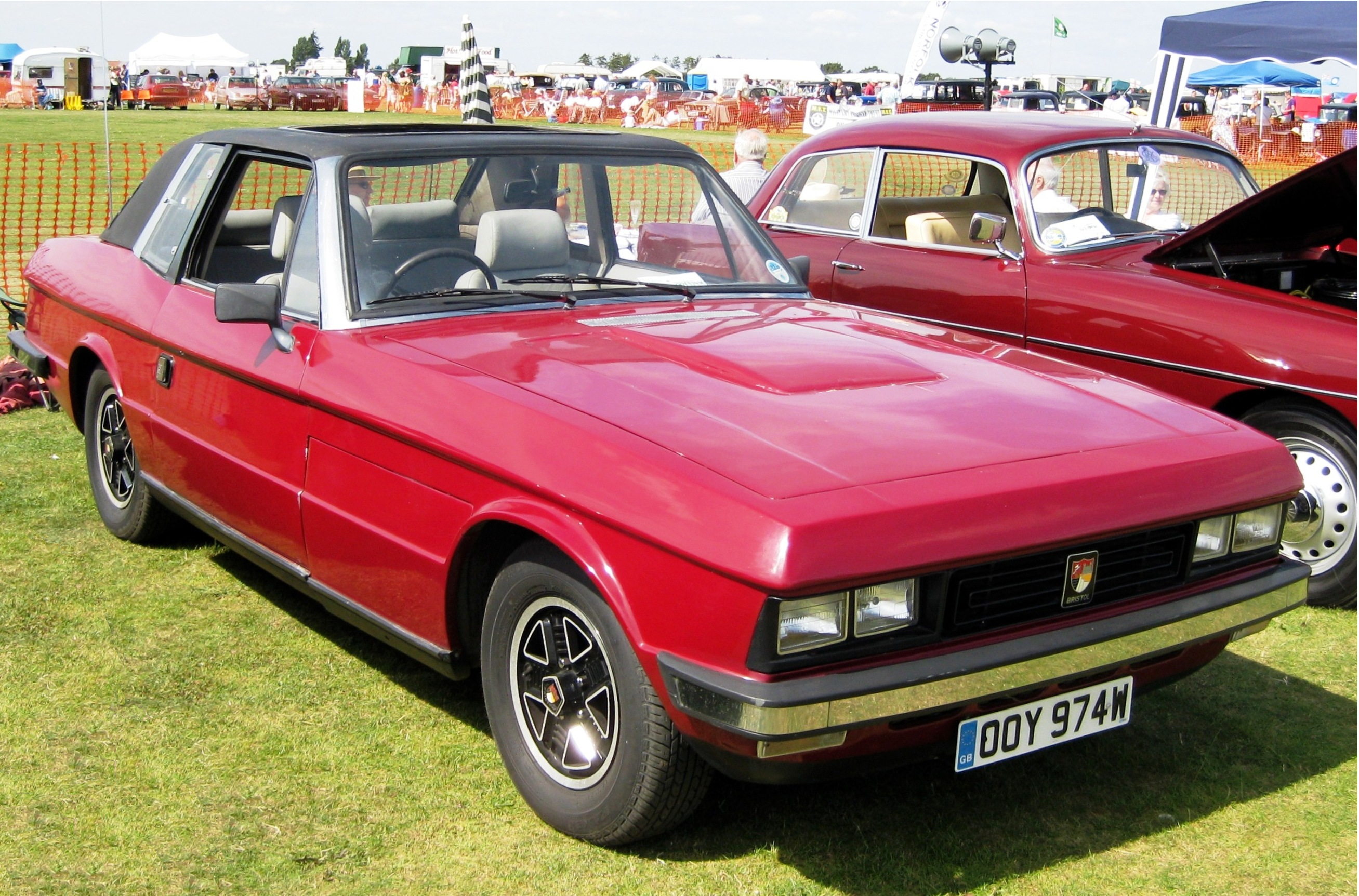
Bristol 412 Beaufighter with 5-spoke Avons

The Avon Safety Wheel was a new type of wheel for cars, invented by the Avon Tyre Company of Britain in the early 1970s. With the advent of radial tyres, taking over from the older crossply type, it was found that in the event of a puncture or blowout, the tyre would be much more prone to detach from the rim, which would make a bad situation somewhat worse.

== Overview ==
The Avon Safety Wheel prevents the detachment of a deflated tyre by having a much shallower central recess inside the wheel. The recess is so shallow that the tyre cannot twist to an angle allowing it to slip over the rim, so it is retained. Such a shallow recess would normally prevent fitting new tyres, but a deep channel is included to let the bead enter during fitting. This channel is then covered by a metal band, tightened around the wheel after the tyre is fitted but before inflation.

== Fitting ==
The fitting procedure is relatively troublesome and not popular with tyre fitters. This may be one reason that this design of wheel has not been widely adopted, meaning that modern cars are still prone to tyre detachment, though tyre safety itself has improved dramatically in the last 30 years. The Avon Safety Wheel was first used on the 1974 Vauxhall Firenza.

== Recognition ==
The wheel design was also used on British Leyland's Morris Marina Safety Research Vehicle, though featuring very different styling from the version employed by Vauxhall. It was also used on the Bristol 411 series 4, Minis and Jaguars, though reportedly it could be fitted on any car or light van.

== See also ==
- Magnesium wheels
