= Car of the Century =

International award

The Car of the Century (COTC) is an international award that was given to the world's most influential car of the 20th century. The election process was overseen by the Global Automotive Elections Foundation. The winner, the Ford Model T, was announced at an awards gala on December 18, 1999 in Las Vegas, Nevada, US.

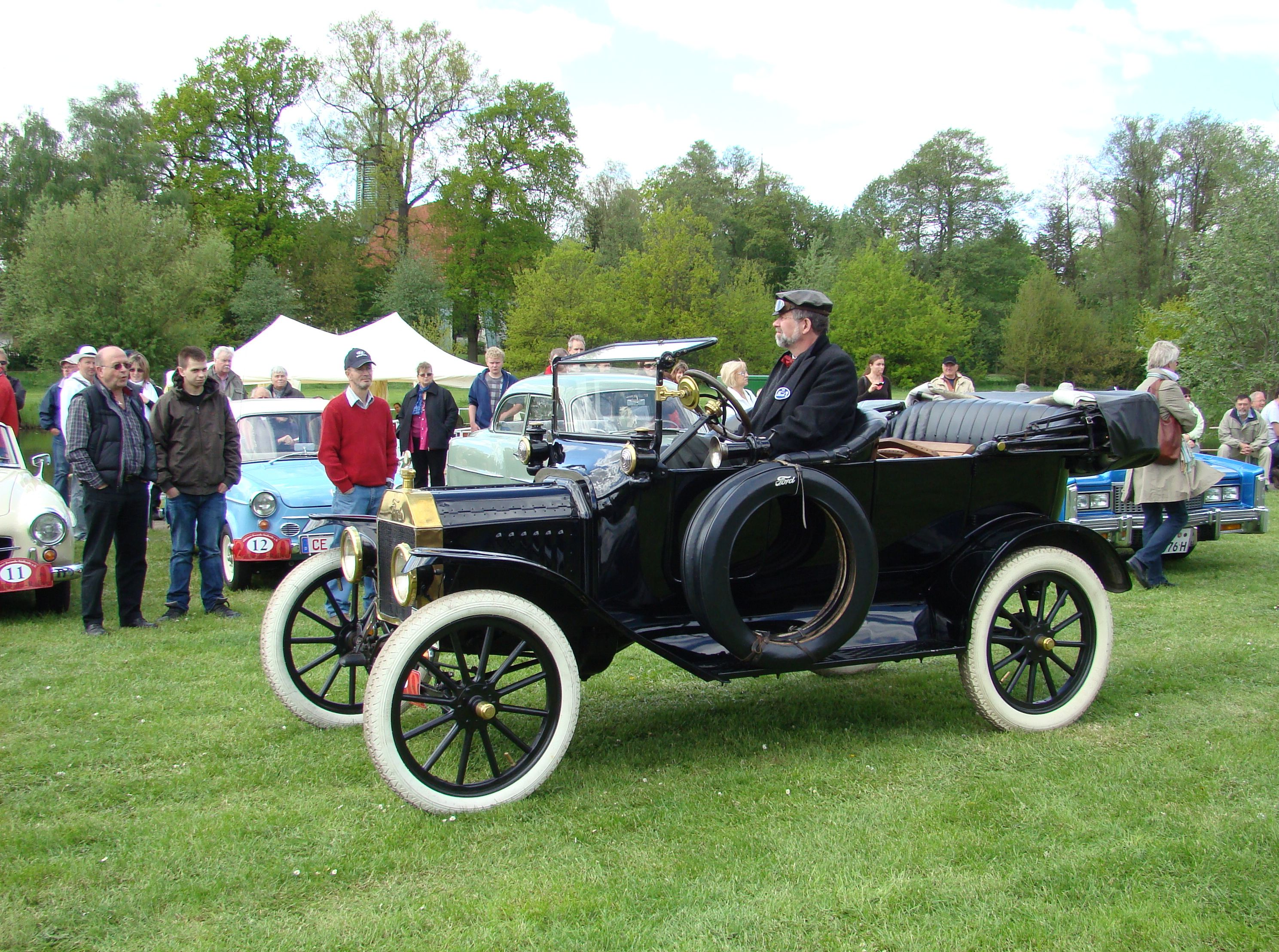
1st place: Ford Model T

== The selection process ==
An elaborate and formal process for deciding the Car of the Century was devised. It started in October 1996, when a list of 700 cars was offered by the COTC organising committee as candidates for the award, which their experts had selected from recommendations made from within the car industry and from car clubs.

In February 1997 a list of 200 eligible cars was announced at the AutoRAI motor show in Amsterdam, having been selected from the 700 by an honorary committee of experts who were all independent and highly respected and experienced automotive experts.

The next step was for a jury of 133 professional automotive journalists from 33 countries, under the presidency of Lord Montagu of Beaulieu, to reduce the list to 100, and the result was announced at the Frankfurt Motor Show in September 1997.

The elimination process proceeded with an Internet-based public vote to select 10 cars, and for 25 cars to be selected by the jury of professionals. In the event, 9 out of the 10 cars selected by the public were also amongst the 25 selected by the journalists (the AC Cobra being the extra car selected by the public), so 26 cars were announced at the Geneva Motor Show in March 1999, as the nominees for the next round.

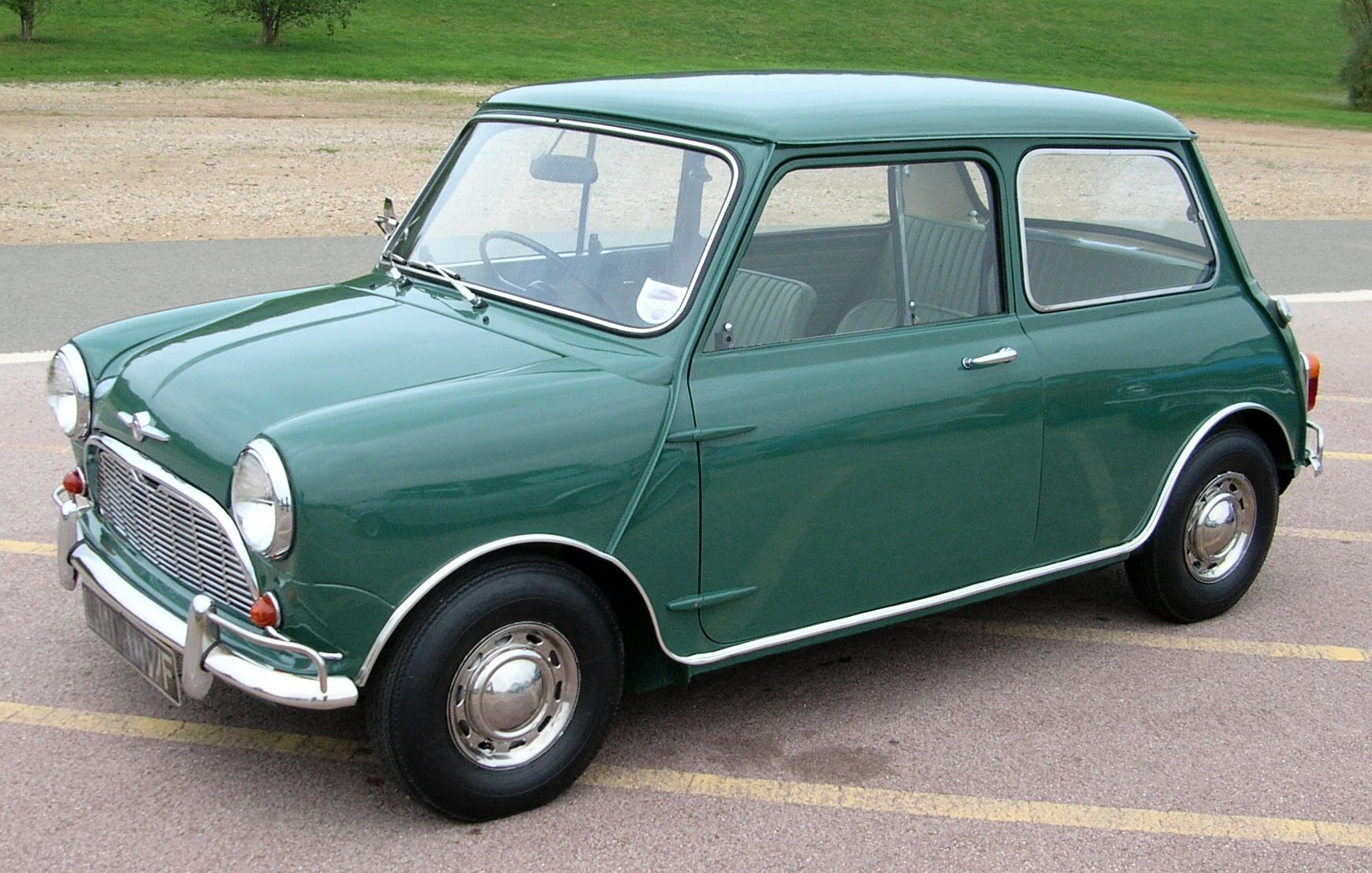
2nd place: Mini

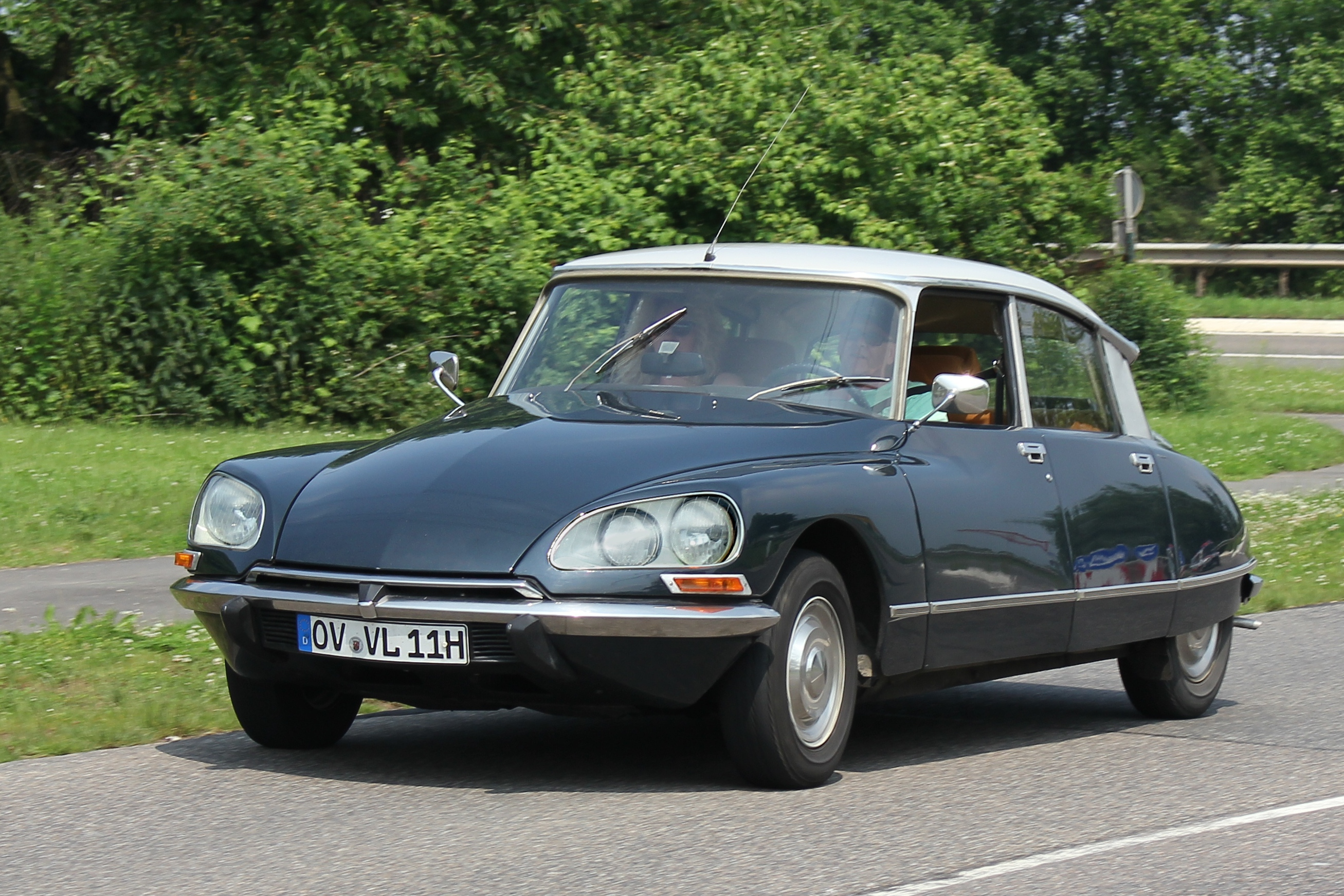
3rd place: Citroën DS

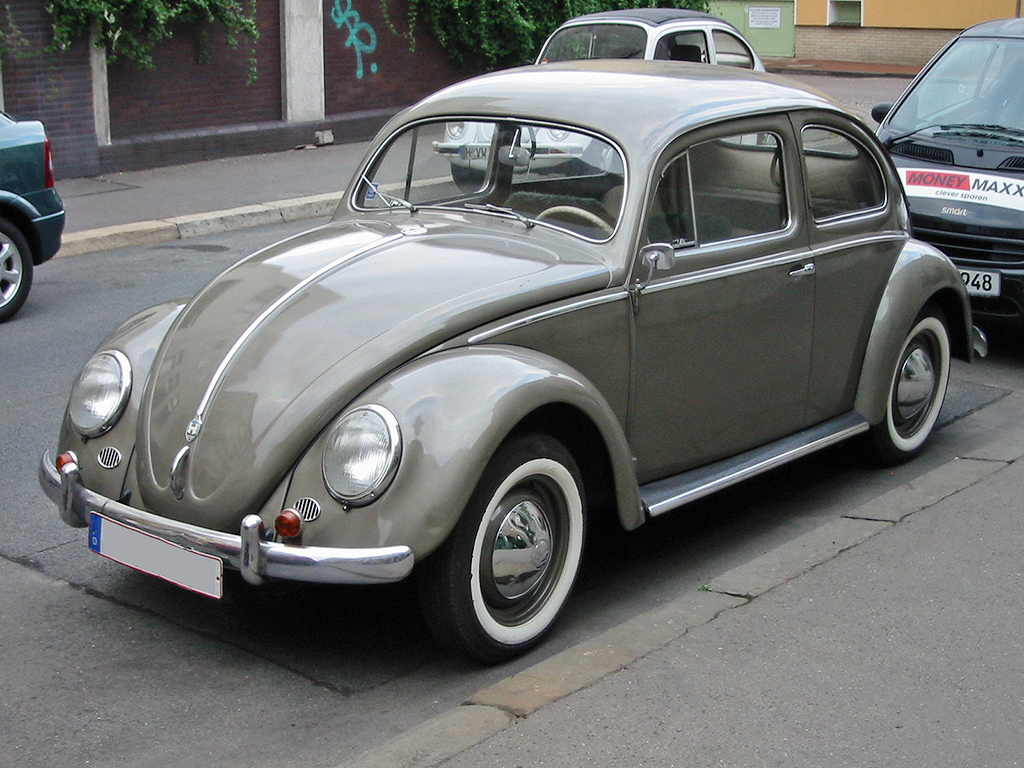
4th place: Volkswagen Beetle

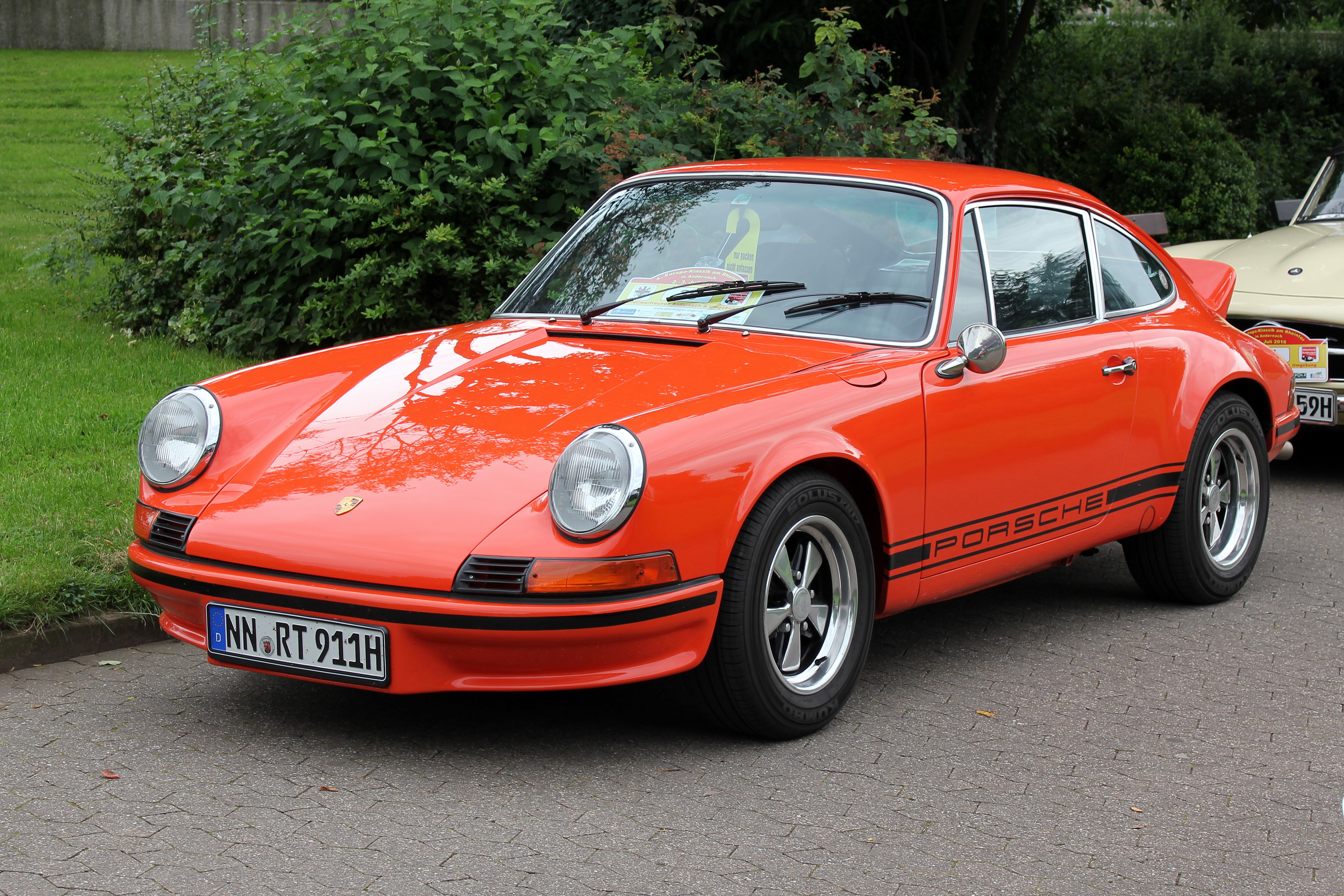
5th place: Porsche 911

The 26 nominees
Make	Type	Year	Country
AC	Cobra	1965–1967	(United Kingdom) UK/US
Alfa Romeo	Giulietta Sprint Coupé	1954–1968	Italy
Audi	Quattro	1980–1991	Germany
Austin	Seven	1922–1939	(United Kingdom) UK
BMW	BMW 328	1936–1940	Germany
Bugatti	T35	1926–1930	France
Chevrolet	Corvette Stingray	1963–1967	(United States) US
Citroën	Traction Avant	1934–1957	France
Citroën	2CV	1948–1990	France
Citroën	DS19	1955–1975	France
Ferrari	250 GT SWB Berlinetta	1959–1962	Italy
Fiat	500 Topolino	1936–1948	Italy
Ford	Model T	1908–1927	(United States) US
Ford	Mustang	1964–1968	(United States) US
Jaguar	XK120	1948–1954	(United Kingdom) UK
Jaguar	E-Type	1961–1975	(United Kingdom) UK
Land Rover	Range Rover	1970–present	(United Kingdom) UK
Mercedes-Benz	S/SS/SSK	1927–1932	Germany
Mercedes-Benz	300 SL Coupé	1954–1957	Germany
Morris/Austin	Mini	1959–2000	(United Kingdom) UK
NSU	Ro 80	1967–1976	Germany
Porsche	911	1964–present	Germany
Renault	Espace	1984–present	France
Rolls-Royce	Silver Ghost	1907–1925	(United Kingdom) UK
Volkswagen	Beetle	1938–2003	Germany
Volkswagen	Golf	1974–present	Germany
Willys	Jeep	1941–1945	(United States) US

From the 26, the jury were asked to nominate five finalists which would go through to the last round of voting, using a points system. The final nominees were announced at the Frankfurt Motor Show in September, 1999.

== The final results ==
The jury each ranked the five cars in their preferred order, and the results were combined with a points system. The final results are:

Position	Car model	Points
1	Ford Model T	742
2	Mini	617
3	Citroën DS	567
4	Volkswagen Beetle	521
5	Porsche 911	303

== See also ==
- Car Designer of the Century
- Car Engineer of the Century
- Car Entrepreneur of the Century
- Car Executive of the Century
- List of motor vehicle awards
