= Charlie Wiggins =

African-American auto racing driver and mechanic

Charlie Edwin Wiggins
- Born: July 15, 1897; Evansville, Indiana, U.S.
- Died: March 11, 1979
- Burial place: Crown Hill Cemetery and Arboretum, Section 100, Lot 244; 39.8144044°N 86.1686984°W

Charles Edwin Wiggins (15 July 1897 – 11 March 1979) was an auto racing driver and mechanic from the United States, who won the prestigious, annual, Gold and Glory Sweepstakes race four times between 1926 and 1935. As an African-American competing in the Midwest during the inter-war years, he was barred from participating in white-only events – including the Indianapolis 500 – but was a leading light in the parallel Colored Speedway Association (CSA) championships. His dominance during this period was such that the popular media dubbed him the Negro Speed King. His career was ended when he was caught up in a serious accident at the 1936 Gold and Glory event, as a consequence of which he lost his right leg and eye.

== Early life ==
Born on 15 July 1897 in Evansville, Indiana, Charlie Wiggins was the son of a coal miner. His mother died when he was only nine years old, and he left school at 11 to earn money as a shoeshine boy, to support his father and two younger siblings. His shoeshine pitch was outside a local auto dealer, and he learned his first mechanical skills by watching through the open doors of the dealership's service shop during breaks between his own customers. Eventually, in 1917 he managed to persuade the dealership to take him on as an apprentice to replace mechanics who had joined the fighting in Europe. Over the following few years he rose to the position of lead technician, this despite the fact that the remainder of the service crew were white.

In 1922, in common with many other African-Americans at the time who were migrating to industrial cities of the north, Wiggins decided to move with his new wife to the state capital, Indianapolis. Wiggins' technical expertise rapidly gained him another leading position at an auto repair garage in the Southside area of the city, and when the owner retired two years later Wiggins bought the business.

== Racing career ==
In his spare time between shifts at the garage, Wiggins decided to build a racing car that he named the Wiggins Special. The vehicle wasn't completed in time for the inaugural Colored Speedway Association (CSA) season in 1924, but in 1925 he entered the CSA's flagship Gold and Glory Sweepstakes race. The Gold and Glory was a 100 miles (160 kilometres) dirt track race that was highly competitive, held on a 1 mile (1.6 kilometres) oval at the Indiana State Fairground, and has been described by motoring writer Dale Drinnon as a "brutal" event, victory in which conferred the "moral equivalent" of a victory in the Indianapolis 500 from which Wiggins and other black race drivers were excluded. Unfortunately for Wiggins, his first entry in the event ended with engine failure, but he had been running with the leaders until that point.

His relative speed encouraged Wiggins to enter a full season of CSA competition in 1926. During the year his domination was almost complete; he won the Gold and Glory race by two clear laps, partly thanks to his uniquely fuel efficient engine that he had engineered to run on a combination of engine oil and Avgas. He also took victory in no fewer than seven of the season's other nine CSA events. His performances in his subsequent seven Gold and Glory races were almost as dominant; Wiggins took three further victories, and even in those races that he didn't win he never finished in lower than fifth position.

In 1934, Wiggins' reputation as a consummate preparer of racing automobiles and race mechanic resulted in him being enlisted into Bill Cummings's Boyle Products race team for the 1934 Indianapolis 500. Wiggins was finagled past race officials by claiming he was the team's janitor. Cummings narrowly won the race from later three time Indy 500 champion Mauri Rose, having led 57 of the 200 racing laps.

Wiggins' career was ended on the second lap of the 1936 Gold and Glory race. He was caught up in a collision when another driver lost control of their car, and in the ensuing 13 car accident Wiggins sustained injuries that resulted in the amputation of his right leg and the loss of his right eye.

== Later life ==
Wiggins' injuries never fully healed and he was left in constant pain for the rest of his life. Medical bills ate away at his money to the extent that later in life he was left virtually penniless. He did what he could, such as making his own prosthetic leg out of wood, but he never fully recovered. Despite his discomfort and increasingly precarious finances, he continued to mentor promising young drivers and campaign against segregationist policies in auto racing.

Wiggins died on 11 March 1979, following yet another infection in his damaged limb.

== Memorials and tributes ==
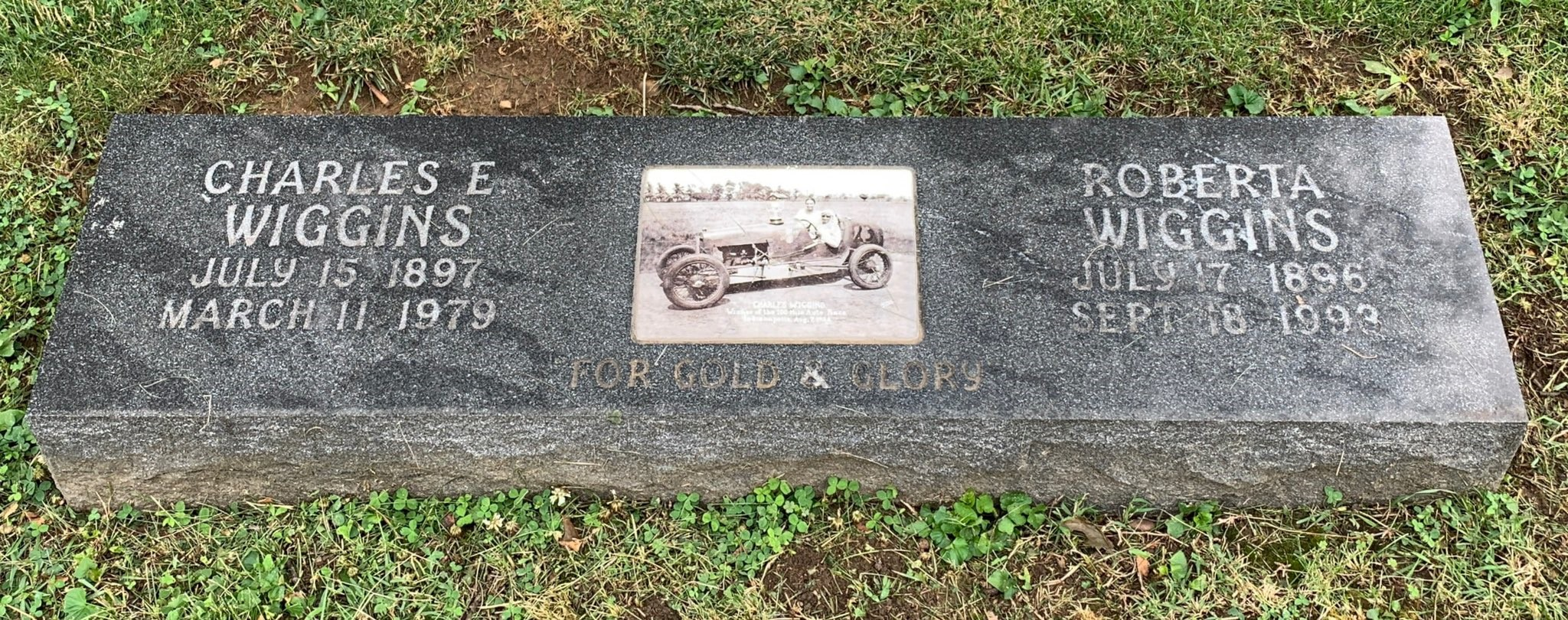
Headstone for Charlie and Roberta Wiggins erected by anonymous donors in 2003.

As a result of the financial struggles Wiggins faced later in life, his loved ones couldn't afford a headstone for his burial. Wiggins and his wife were buried in an unmarked grave for 24 years until 2003, when a memorial was held in his honor at Crown Hill Cemetery in Indianapolis, Indiana. Over 50 onlookers were present and witnessed Wiggins finally receive a stone. The marker is a vintage photo of Wiggins and his wife, Roberta standing by his car with the 1926 Gold and Glory Sweepstakes trophy. Wiggins' contributions to the racing community were celebrated during the memorial, highlighting his legacy and impact on the sport.

In 2018, the Indiana Racing Memorial Association erected a historical marker dedicated to Wiggins outside of the Evansville African American Museum.

In 2026, a special exhibition on the life and racing history of Wiggins, curated by Edward T. Welburn and titled For Gold & Glory, opened at LeMay - America's Car Museum.
