= Productionisation =

Turning a prototype into a production-ready version

Productionisation (Commonwealth English) or productionization (American English) is the process of turning a prototype of a design into a version that can be more easily mass-produced. It is mostly a necessary step in the development of any product, since it is rare that the initial design is free from flaws or construction methods which make it difficult or more expensive to manufacture.

Prototypes are very often constructed by hand, or with more limited tooling. This is done to save costs where the design may not even be subsequently approved for manufacture. Once the go-ahead for a production run is given, the much more costly production tooling can be ordered. At this stage, the design itself may need to be reworked or altered to streamline production. The goal is to reduce costs as much as possible at the assembly stage, since costs will be multiplied by the number of units produced. For example, a prototype might be assembled using nuts and bolts, but in production such fasteners might be replaced by captive nuts or threaded holes built into the parts, making assembly much faster, easier and therefore cheaper.

Sometimes limited runs of a design might be manufactured without full productionisation.

Other examples of productionisation include:

- plastic mouldings instead of hand-constructed parts
- built-in fasteners
- snap-together or machine welded parts instead of using fasteners
- custom integrated circuits instead of discrete electronic components
- customised IT solutions released into a live environment.

Productionisation is a term that is increasingly prevalent in Software Development. One reason for this is the popularity of agile type development methods, which often focus on building a prototype solution to develop and refine the product to meet business requirements. Prior to putting the system into production, the developers need to ensure the system is robust enough for the target environment with regard to aspects such as error handling, stability, usability, scalability and performance. This process of making the prototype ‘production or enterprise grade’ is often referred to as ‘Productionisation’.
