= Vauxhall SRV =

1970 Vauxhall Motors concept car

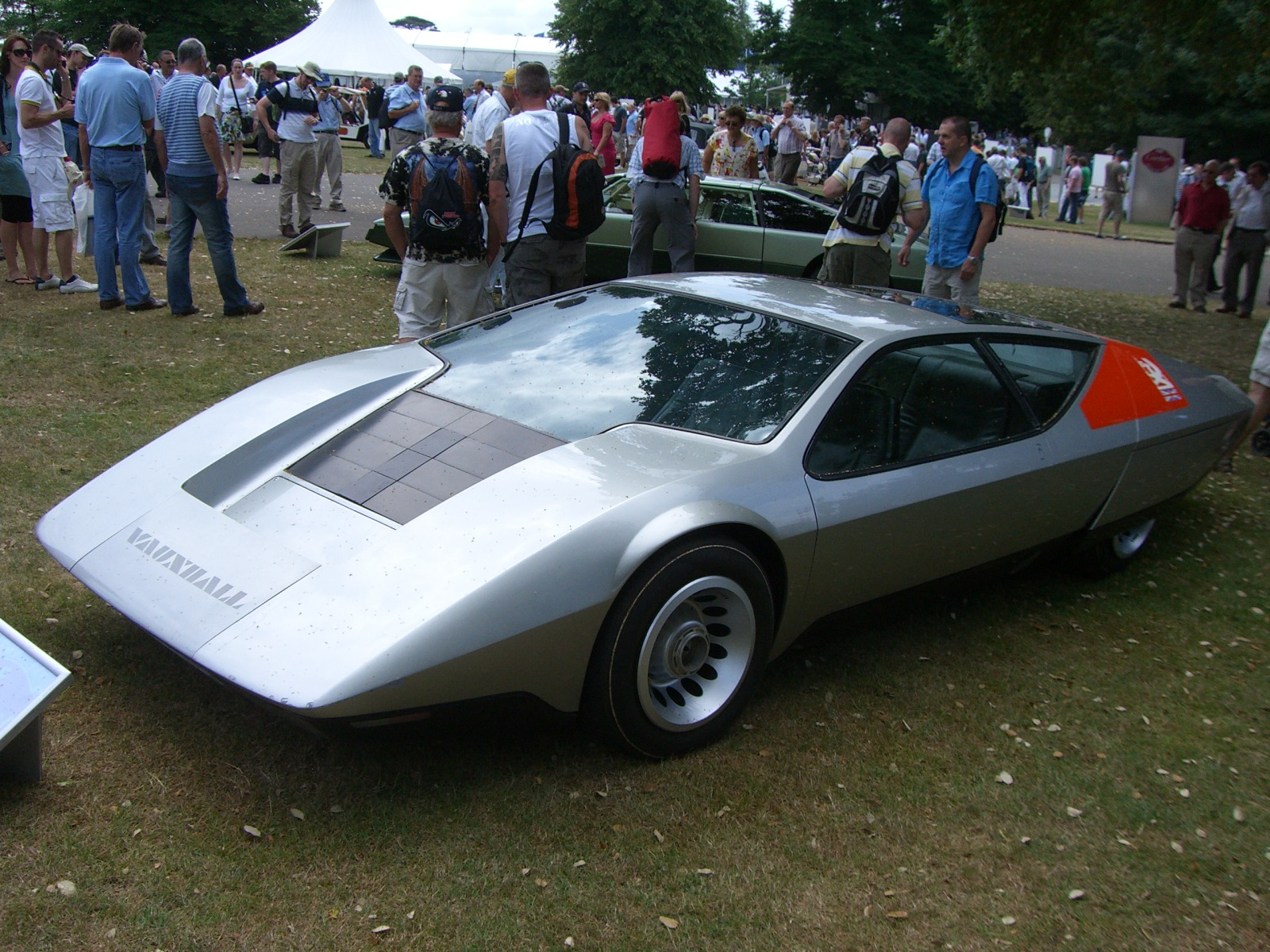
Vauxhall SRV (July 2009)

The Vauxhall SRV (Styling Research Vehicle) is a 1970 concept car designed by Wayne Cherry and Chris Field for Vauxhall Motors. Never intended for production, the car was an attempt to raise Vauxhall's profile and image while providing a research platform for novel design concepts.

The car's exterior design was inspired by the short-nosed, long-tailed Le Mans racers of the time, but was able to seat four adults in comfort, despite being just 41 inches (104 cm) high. Unusually, the design featured fixed front seats but with all of the driver controls adjustable for position, angle, and reach. The car has been displayed more recently, such as at the London Classic Car Show in March 2017.

The car featured four doors, with the rear doors being handle-less and largely disguised, a feature that would take more than thirty years to be incorporated into real production cars. The car could change its aerodynamic profile using an adjustable aerofoil, which was located in the nose section. The SRV also had electrically adjusted suspension levelling at the rear, and the car could redistribute fuel to different tanks to adjust the centre of gravity.

The instruments were fixed to a pod which was hinged to the driver's door. The engine is a 2.3-litre, transversely mid-mounted Slant-Four, featuring fuel injection with a top speed of 225 kilometres per hour (140 mph). The engine fitted to the SRV was actually a mock up; the car was unable to run under its own power and the necessary transverse transmission was never developed.
