= Fierro =

Fierro is a Spanish and Italian surname and middle name meaning "iron". Notable people with the name include:

== Surnames ==
- Carlos Fierro (born 1994), Mexican footballer
- Fanny Carrión de Fierro (born 1936), Ecuadorian writer and literary critic
- Gonzalo Fierro (born 1983), Chilean football player
- Josefina Fierro de Bright (1914–1998), Mexican-American activist
- Juan Fierro (born 1974), Chilean road cyclist
- Julieta Fierro (1948–2025), Mexican astrophysicist and science communicator
- Lee Fierro (1929–2020), American actress
- Martha Fierro (born 1977), Ecuadorian chess champion
- Martin Fierro (saxophonist) (1942–2008), Mexican-American saxophonist
- Michelle Fierro (born 1967), American artist
- Oscar Zeta Acosta Fierro, author, lawyer, Chicano activist - made famous by his depiction as Hunter S. Thompson's attorney in the novel and later movie Fear and Loathing in Las Vegas
- Rodolfo Fierro (1880–1915), General in the Pancho Villa army during the Mexican Revolution
- Rodrigo Fierro (born 1930), Ecuadorian physician, writer and politician, Minister of Health of Ecuador from 1979 to 1981
- Aurelio Fierro (1923–2005), Italian actor and singer

== Middle names ==
- Cynthia Fierro Harvey (born 1959), United Methodist Church bishop

== Fictional characters ==
- Martín Fierro, a fictitious character in a poem by Argentine José Hernández
- Alex Fierro, a fictional character in Rick Riordan's Magnus Chase and the Gods of Asgard series

== See also ==
- Fiero (disambiguation)
