= Fierro (disambiguation) =

Fierro is a Spanish and Italian surname and middle name.

Fierro may also refer to:

- Fierro (film), an Argentinian animated film released November 2007
- Fierro Group, a Spanish economic group
- Fierro (magazine), an Argentinian comics magazine
- San Fierro, San Andreas, a fictional city

== See also ==
- Fiero (disambiguation)
