= Fiero (disambiguation) =

Fiero may refer to:

== People ==
- Conro Fiero (fl. 1910), American orcharder; see Conro Fiero House
- Joshua Fiero Jr. (1818–1886), American politician
- Kenneth Fiero (1911–1987), American politician
- Patricia Fiero (born 1941), American politician
- Fiero (wrestler) (born 1997), Mexican professional wrestler

== Fictional characters ==
- Fiero, wizard from the Elena of Avalor animated series, voiced by Héctor Elizondo
- Jeanette Fiero, character from Necessary Roughness, played by Amanda Detmer

== Vehicles ==
- Pontiac Fiero, American sports car
- TVS Fiero, Indian motorcycle

== Other uses ==
- The Fieros, American rock group
- Martini Fiero, brand of vermouth

== See also ==
- Fierro (disambiguation)
