= Irv Rybicki =

American car designer

- Born: Irvin Walter Rybicki; September 16, 1921; Detroit, Michigan, US
- Died: July 24, 2001 (aged 79); Sandwich, Massachusetts, US
- Education: Meinzinger Art School
- Occupation: Car designer
- Employer: General Motors (1944–1986)
- Known for: Vice President of General Motors Design (1977–1986)

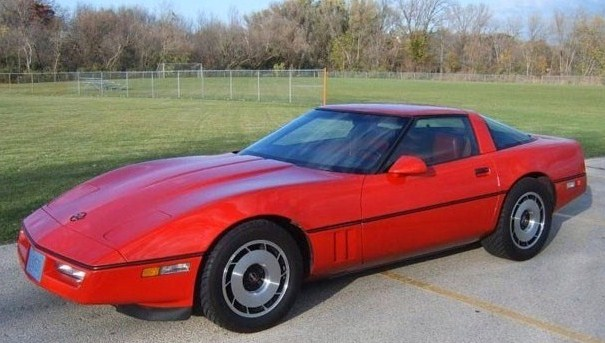
1984 Chevrolet 'C4' Corvette

Irvin Walter Rybicki (September 16, 1921 – July 24, 2001) was an American automotive designer widely known for his career as a designer with General Motors and his tenure as the corporation's Vice President of Design from 1977–1986, succeeding Harley Earl and Bill Mitchell in that role.

Over a career spanning 43 years with GM, Rybicki contributed significantly: from his work on the 1953 Cadillac Le Mans; his forecasting the potential market for an inexpensive, sporty four-passenger car, what would become the first generation 1967 Chevrolet Camaro; his contributions to the successful 1973 Chevrolet Monte Carlo and, as Vice President, his design leadership on the 1982 Chevrolet Camaro, 1984 Chevrolet Corvette, 1984 Pontiac Fiero and the 1985–1990 GM C-bodies: the Buick Electra, Oldsmobile 98 and Cadillac Deville/Fleetwood among others.

Having served as a styling director for each of GM's five brand divisions, Rybicki assumed the corporate design leadership just as the industry entered a period of tremendous pressure: in quick succession, the federal government mandated waves of increasingly strict and comprehensive automotive emissions, fuel efficiency and safety standards – severely hindering the industry's ability to adapt – a period that became widely associated with austere and ungainly design, referred to in retrospect as the Malaise era.

== Background ==
Rybicki was born September 16, 1921, in Detroit to Wladyslav Walter Rybicki and Helen Biess Rybicki.

Rybicki attended Catholic grade school, and at an early age, began sketching and modeling airplanes while attending Detroit's Chadsey High School, graduating in 1940 – and summering at his father's place at Portage Lake. He would later study art at the Meinzinger Art School in Detroit. His earliest sketching focus on airplanes changed when he saw his uncle's 1938 Cadillac Sixty Special, declaring it "the most beautiful thing I’ve ever seen," and turning his interest to cars.

After he graduated from high school, Rybicki's father took his design sketches to General Motors without his knowledge, speaking with Jules Andrade, one of Harley Earl’s assistants. GM showed interest in Rybicki's work, retaining his information and as it turned to wartime production.

Wounded in the United States during his military service, he was discharged and never went abroad to fight during World War II.

In 1946, Rybicki married Hazel Lee Ryland Rybicki (1926–2023). They lived in Bloomfield Hills, and after his retirement from General Motors maintained a residence in Jensen Beach, Florida. He died 24 Jul 2001 at 79 in Sandwich, Massachusetts and was survived by his wife, son David Irvin Rybicki and daughter Susan Rybicki Sheehan.

== GM early career ==
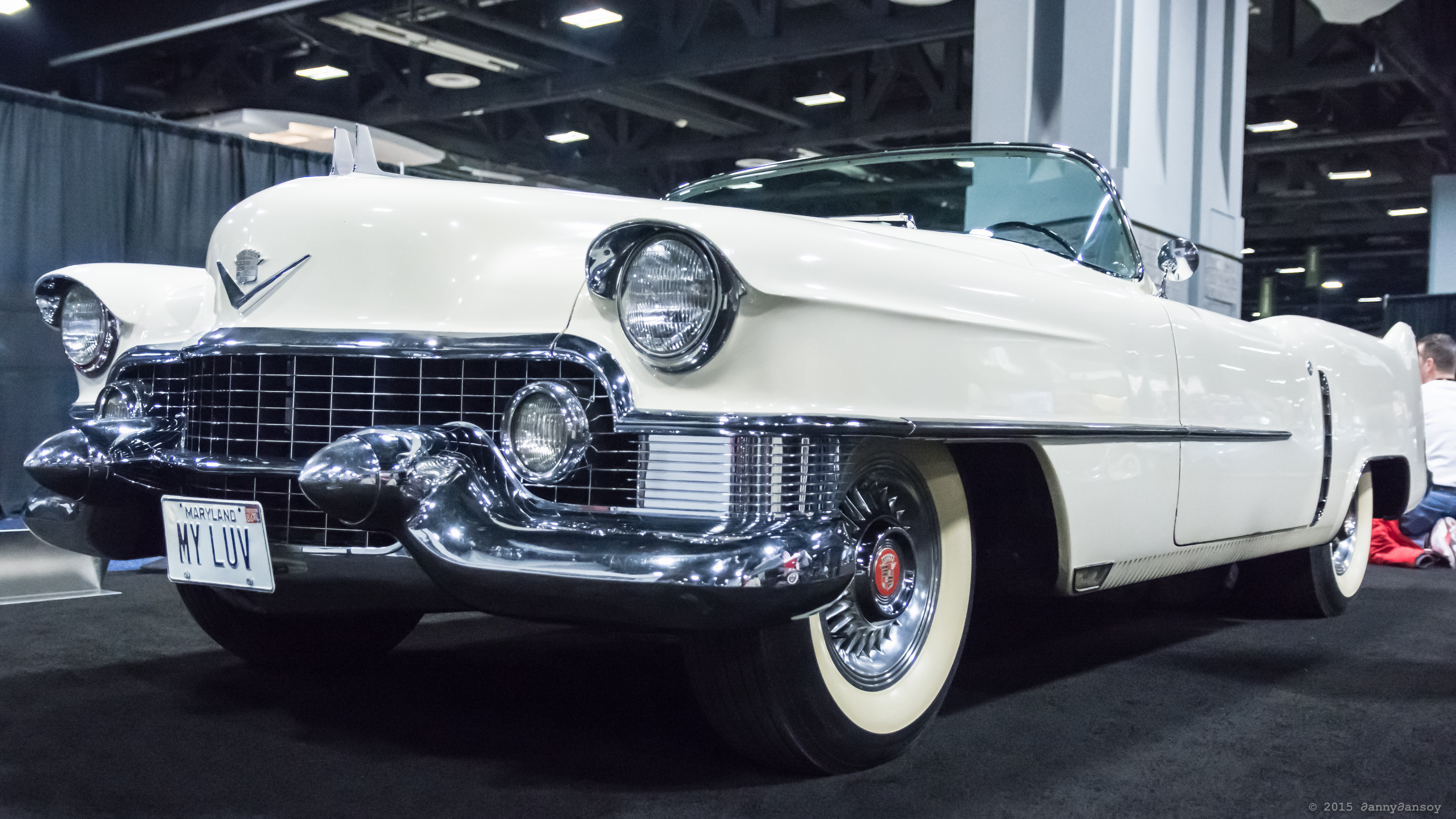
1953 Cadillac Le Mans Concept

In February 1944, in pursuit of an automotive styling career, Rybecki applied for and was hired as a project engineer by GM's Engineering Standards Laboratory at the GM Proving Ground. In September 1945, a colleague at the lab asked to show Rybicki's sketches to Harley Earl, whereby he was transferred to the GM Styling Staff (now GM design) as a junior designer. He studied with the Forty Milwaukee, GM's school for trainee designers – led by Ned Nickles and later Frank Hershey.

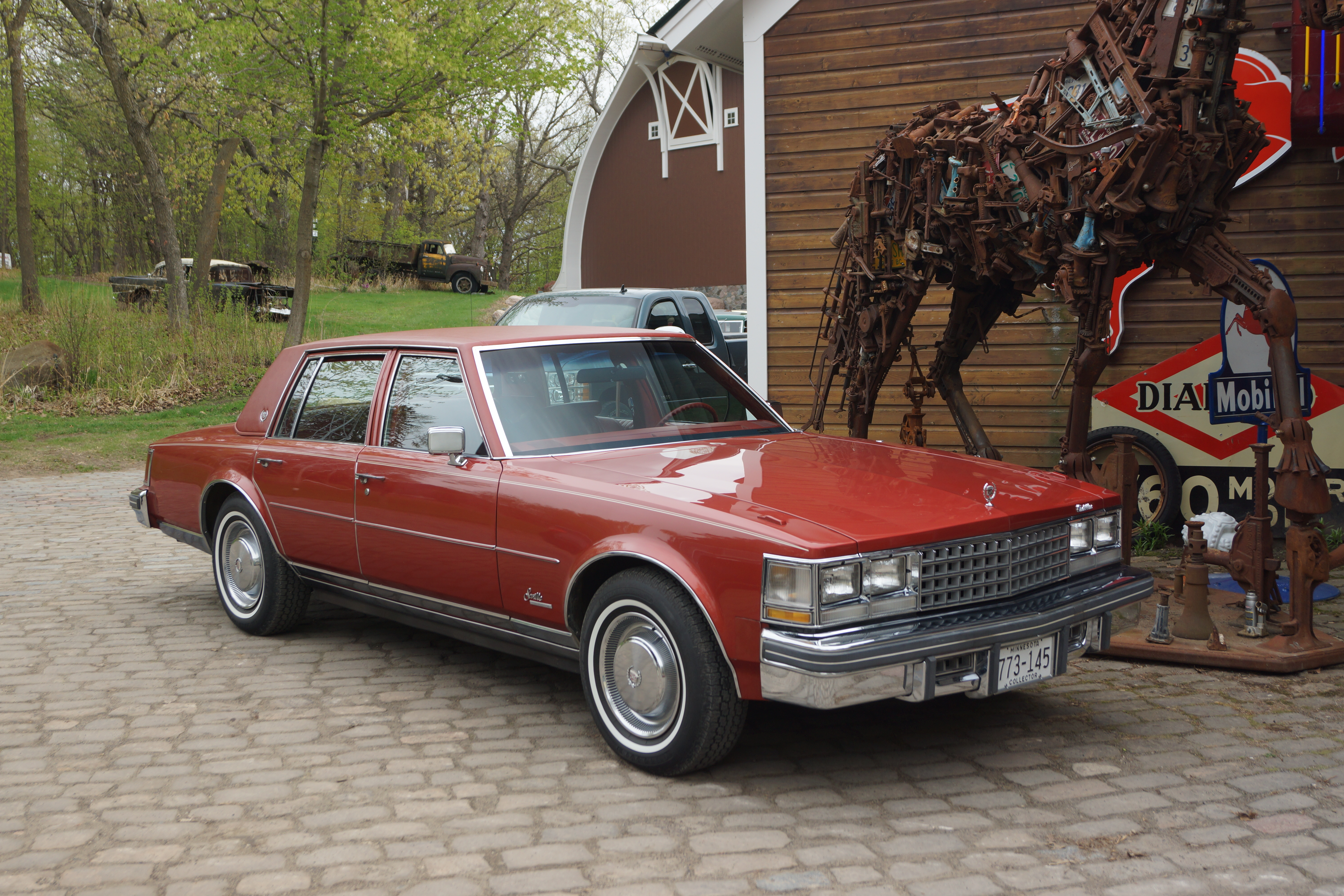
1976 Cadillac Seville

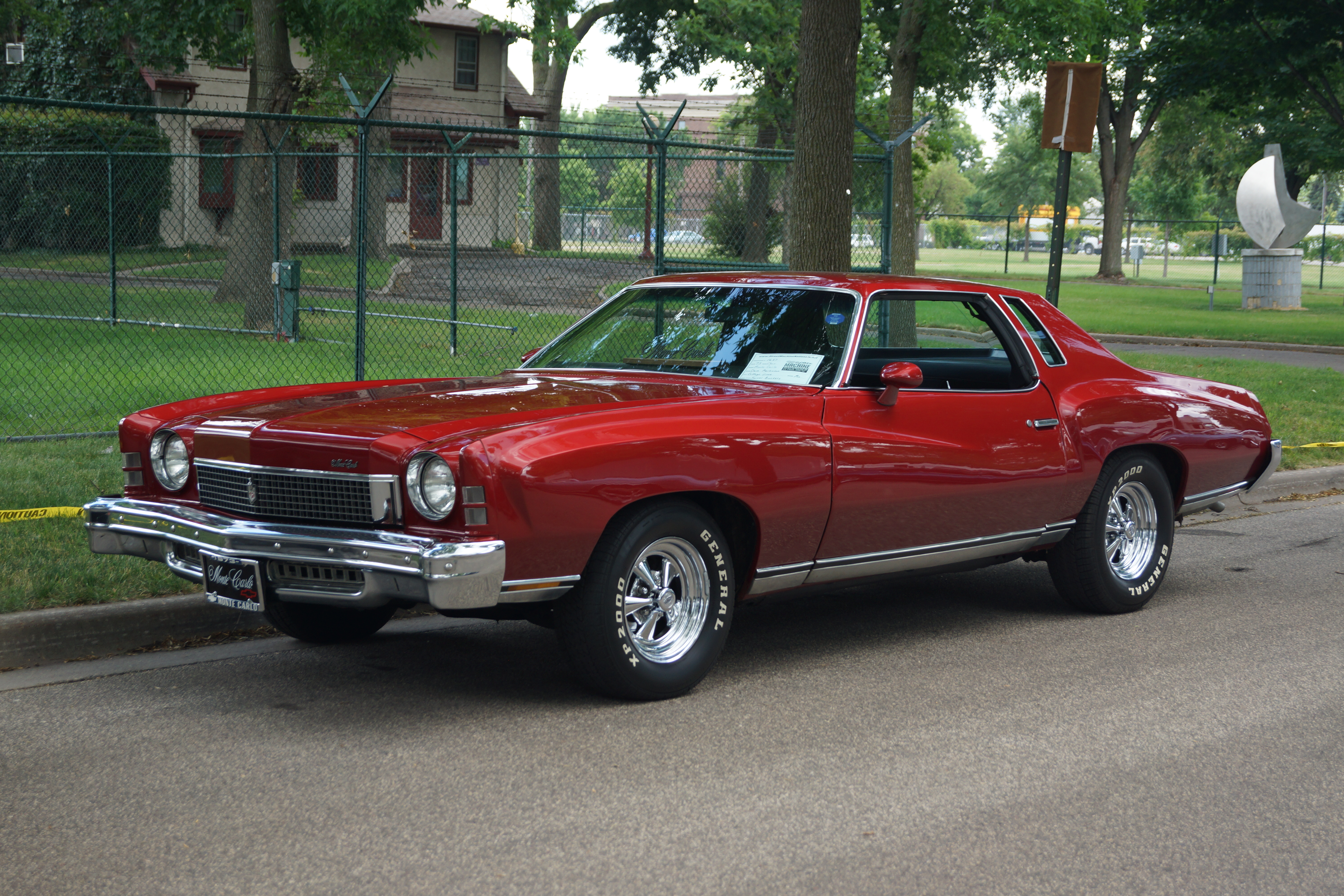
1973 Chevrolet Monte Carlo

He was promoted to designer in 1947 and senior designer in 1950. He spent six years in the Cadillac studio under future Styling VP Bill Mitchell. Rybicki was noted for innovating the concealed gas cap for the 1948 Cadillac, hidden within the flip-top taillight. Rybicki styled the interior and instrument panel of the 1953 Cadillac Le Mans concept car.

In 1956, Rybicki became assistant chief designer at the Oldsmobile Studio where he was subsequently promoted to chief designer, remaining for five years. in February 1962, Rybicki became the chief designer in GM's Chevrolet studio, where he helped make GM’s lowest priced cars and trucks appear more upscale.

In 1963, Rybicki and his team presented Bunkie Knudsen with a styling concept for a four-seater car with a sporty image that could augment the Corvette – what could have effectively leap-frogged the first Ford Mustang. Knudsen rejected the idea and GM was forced to play catch-up, introducing the first Camaro in 1967.

Rybicki became group chief designer for the Chevrolet passenger car and GMC truck studios in 1965 and became the executive in charge of exterior design for Chevrolet and Pontiac passenger cars and Chevrolet and GMC trucks in 1970.

Rybicki led the team that redesigned the Monte Carlo for the 1973 model year, which Chevrolet general manager John Z. DeLorean approved for production without a single revision. The design featured an opera or coach window in the B-pillar. GM’s management liked the small window and gave it first the 1971 Cadillac Eldorado. When it arrived on the Monte Carlo, it thus carried the halo of a Cadillac design detail.

Rybicki remained in his position over Chevrolet, Pontiac and GMC until 1972, when he was named executive in charge of Oldsmobile, Buick and Cadillac. Rybicki worked on the design of the first generation Cadillac Seville and had a major role in GM's massive downsizing of the 1977 full-size and 1978 intermediate cars.

== GM Vice Presidency ==
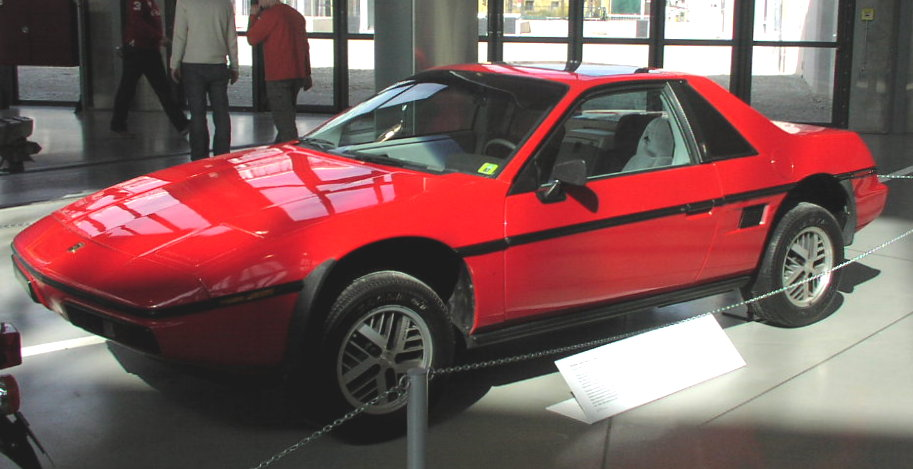
1984 Pontiac Fiero

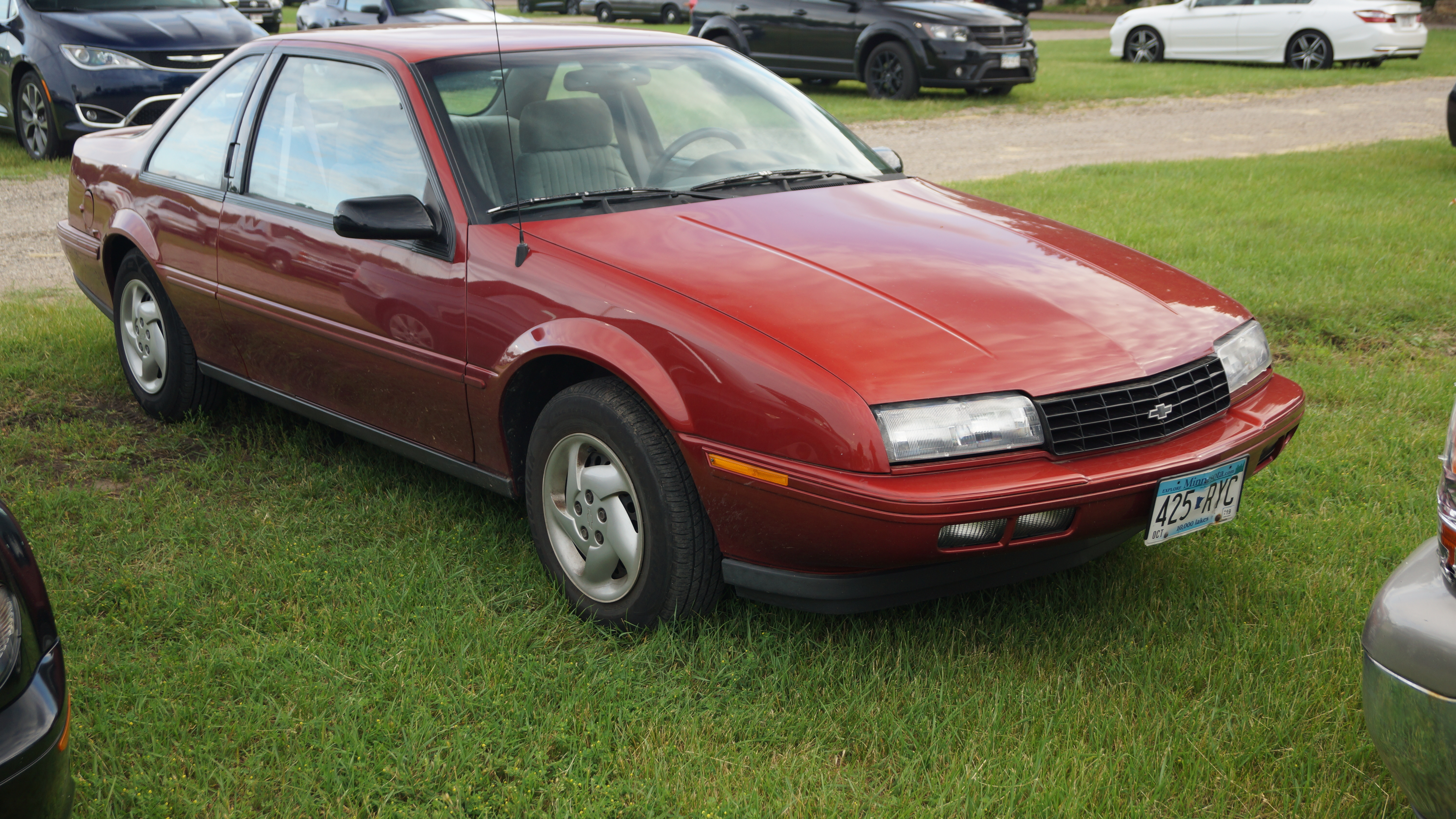
1995 Chevrolet Beretta

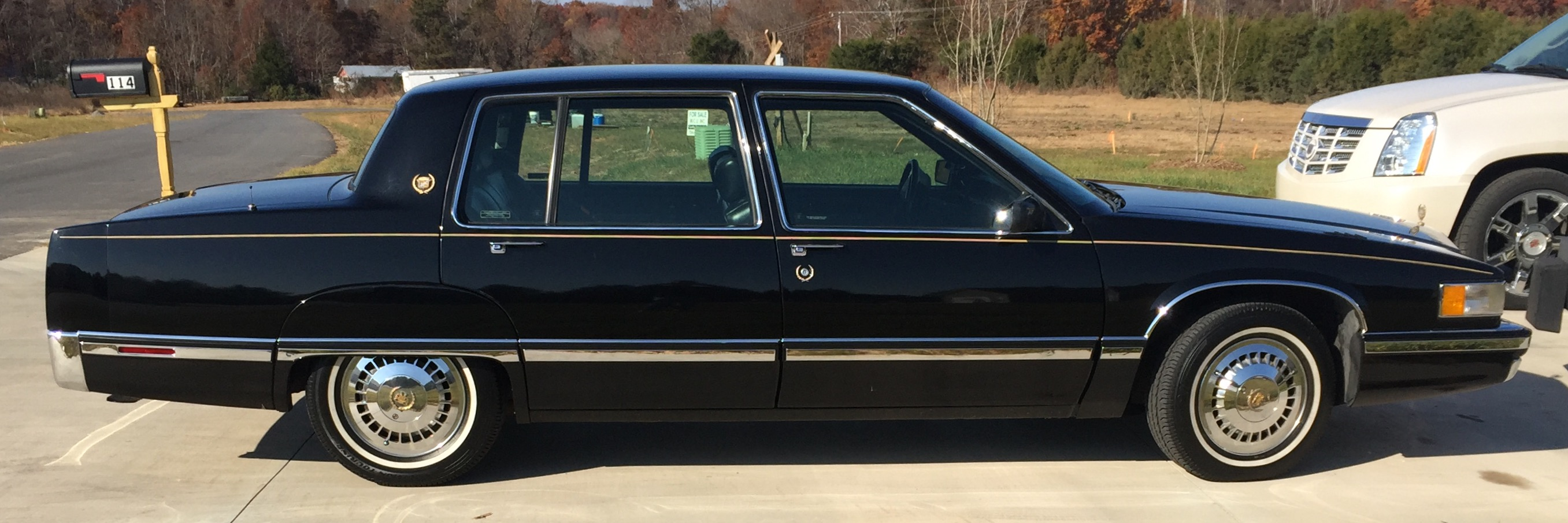
1993 Cadillac Sixty Special

Rybicki superseded Bill Mitchell, an outspoken, passionate designer, as GM Styling vice president on August 1, 1977 – at a time when the industry and company faced new fuel economy, safety regulations and emissions regulations; increased foreign competition, and a more controlling upper management. He was only one of seven to hold the Vice President of Design position, including Harley Earl, Bill Mitchell, Chuck Jordan, Wayne Cherry, Ed Welburn and Michael Simcoe.

Physically reserved and discreet, Irvin Rybicki neither wore the flamboyant outfits of his predecessors, nor had their forceful, outsized egos.

The oil crises of 1973 and 1979, along with the Energy and Conservation Act of 1975, required the company build more fuel-efficient cars. To this end he oversaw the styling for the corporation's transformation to front-wheel-drive, including the J-Platform cars, A-platform cars, C/H Platform cars as well as the GM-10/W-platform cars. He oversaw the 1982 Chevy Camaro and Pontiac Firebird, 1984 C4 Corvette and Ed Welburn's Olds Aerotech design.

Notably, Rybicki oversaw a design period under CEO Roger Smith where the A-bodies were called out on the cover of the August 22, 1983 issue of Fortune Magazine – for their cookie cutter design.

All automotive design staff competing in the United States faced complex federal regulations; Motor Trend magazine noted in 2016 that "confusion over how to cope with these new laws from a design and engineering standpoint led to poor decisions that affected the exterior and interior appearance of GM’s cars through the late 1970s and 1980s."

Noted automotive writer Michael Lamm and Dave Holls, former General Motors designer, wrote in their book A Century of Automotive Style: 100 Years of Automotive Design, that "General Motors, during Rybicki's nine years in office, would lose not just its identity but its dominance of the American industry. It would lose its half century of automotive design leadership." The authors noted that Rybicki's

strength lay in administration. (GM Executive Vice President Howard) Kehrl wanted a good administrator, someone who could put GM Design Staff on a more businesslike footing. He got that. As a designer, Rybicki had done some nice things when he ran the Olds and Chevrolet studios, but he lacked emotion and forcefulness. He didn't have the conviction to fight for design. He was too gentle a person to do battle at all.

Automotive author Dave McLellan, in his book Corvette From The Inside,described Rybicki as a "team player, someone that would allow GM's top brass more control over styling. Mitchell had been a real pain in the ass, and the board wasn't going to have any more of that. Rybicki liked big, cushy cars, and had a debilitating back problem," adding "Irv may well have been an okay guy, but he was definitely a yes-man."

Near the end of tenure as Vice President of Design, Rybicki gave an extensive interview with David Crippen for the Automotive Design Oral History project at the Benson Ford Research Center at the Henry Ford Museum, formerly The Henry Ford. Rybicki retired from GM in October 1986.

== Design leadership ==
- 1973–1977 Chevrolet Monte Carlo
- 1982–1994 Chevrolet Cavalier
- 1983 General Motors Aero 2002 Concept Car
- 1985–1990 Buick Electra, Oldsmobile 98/Touring Sedan
- 1985–1993 Cadillac DeVille, Fleetwood, Sixty Special
- 1986–1993 Cadillac Eldorado, Seville
- 1987–1991 Pontiac Bonneville
- 1987–1996 Chevrolet Corsica/Chevrolet Beretta
