= General Motors Aero Concept Car =

The Aero was a range of concept car studies created by General Motors as a testbed for future aerodynamic improvements to car bodies. The first model was the 1981 Aero X, a five-door hatchback.

In 1982 the Aero 2000 was shown, a smaller two-door car, it had several unique features, such as front and rear fender skirts, a kammback design, and a smoothed underbelly. Almost all of these features have been incorporated into modern hybrid car designs at some point, with the exception of front fender skirts. The Aero 2000 had a drag coefficient of 0.23, but had no engine so could not be driven.

The Aero 2002 was shown a year later at the 1983 with its much improved Cd of 0.14. Designed by Irv Rybicki, it was to influence the 1984 Chevrolet Citation IV concept.
