= Cadillac Le Mans =

Concept car developed by Cadillac in 1953

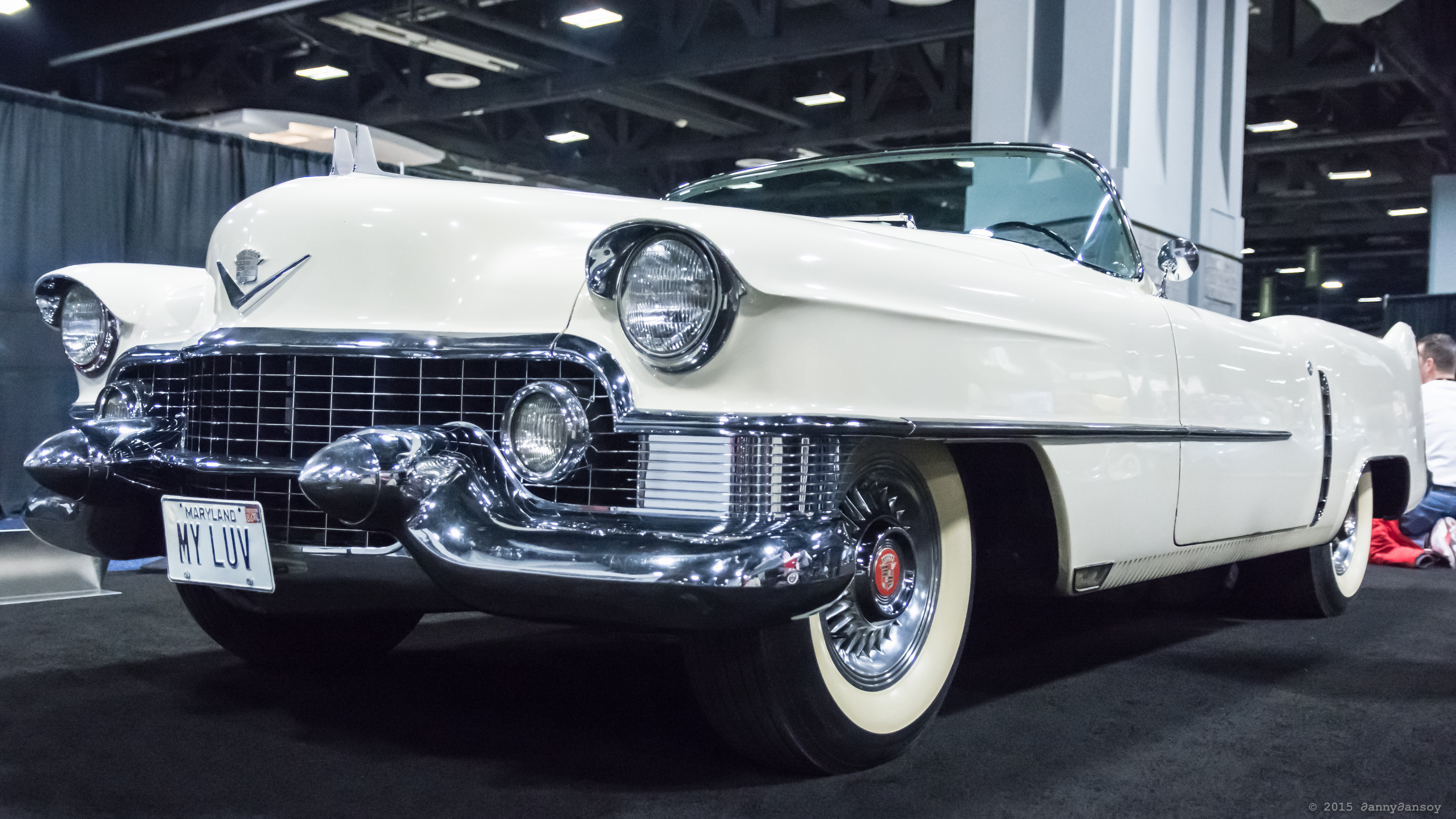
- 1953 Cadillac Le Mans concept at the 2015 DC Auto Show

Overview
- Manufacturer: Cadillac (General Motors)
- Production: none
- Model years: 1953
- Assembly: Clark Street Assembly, Detroit
- Designer: Harley Earl; Irv Rybicki (interior)

Body and chassis
- Class: Concept luxury roadster
- Body style: 2-door convertible
- Layout: FR layout
- Related: Cadillac Series 62 Cadillac Eldorado convertible

Powertrain
- Engine: 331 cu in (5.4 L) V8 engine

Dimensions
- Length: 196 in (4,978 mm)

The Cadillac Le Mans was a concept car designed by Harley Earl and developed by Cadillac. It was named for the 24 Hours of Le Mans race in France, in which Cadillac competed in 1950. Displayed at the 1953 General Motors Motorama in New York City, the design was a low-profile (51 inches (1,300 mm) to the windshield frame), two-seat, fiberglass-bodied roadster. This concept showcased Cadillac's first wrap-around windshield. It was powered by a 250 hp (186 kW) version of Cadillac's 331 cu in (5,420 cc) V8 engine, a power output not realized in production Cadillacs until 1955. The overall length of the Le Mans was 196 in (4,978 mm). Though four prototypes were built, the model never went into production.

== Fate of the vehicles ==
Of the four Cadillac Le Mans cars, the fate of three is known. One car, which was customized by George Barris, was acquired by Harry Karl, a wealthy shoe manufacturer who gave it to his wife, Marie "The Body" MacDonald. Another was sold to a Cadillac dealer in Beverly Hills, California. The George Barris custom was destroyed in a fire in 1985, while another one is currently displayed in the Cadillac Historical Collection in Warren, Michigan. The revised car, restyled by GM stylists with quad headlights and sleeker fins, is in possession of the GM Heritage Center.

The fourth Cadillac Le Mans was displayed at the Oil Progress Exhibition at Will Rogers Field in Oklahoma City in 1953, along with two other show cars from the 1953 Motorama exhibition (the Wildcat I and the Starfire). After that, this car went on exhibit at Greenhouse-Moore Cadillac Chevrolet in Oklahoma City during the first week of November. The vehicle went missing on November 8, 1953, and has not been seen since that time. Numerous investigators and auto enthusiasts have tried to find the missing Le Mans, but so far their efforts have yielded no results.

== Gallery ==
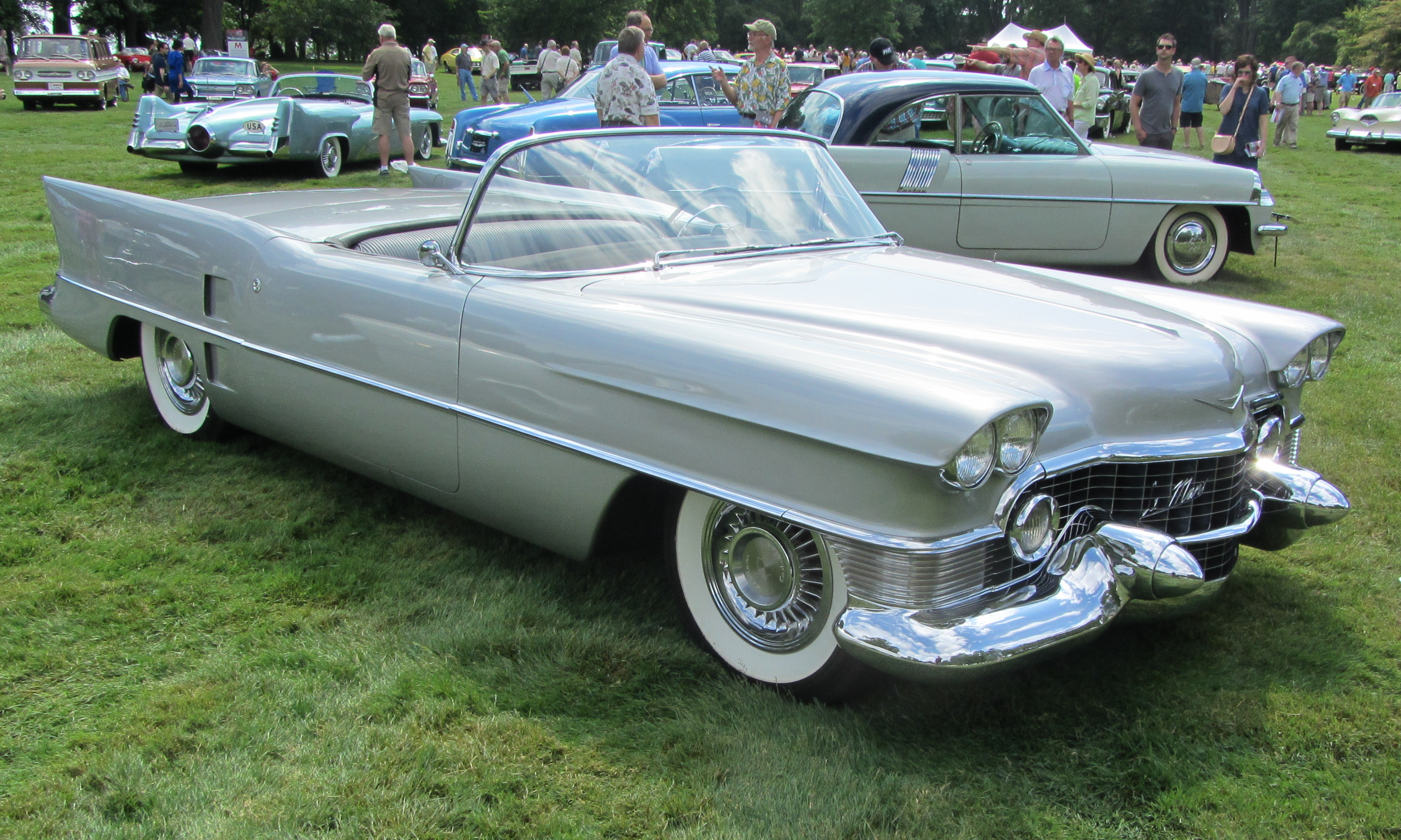
Cadillac Le Mans concept revised by GM stylists with quad headlights and sleeker fins

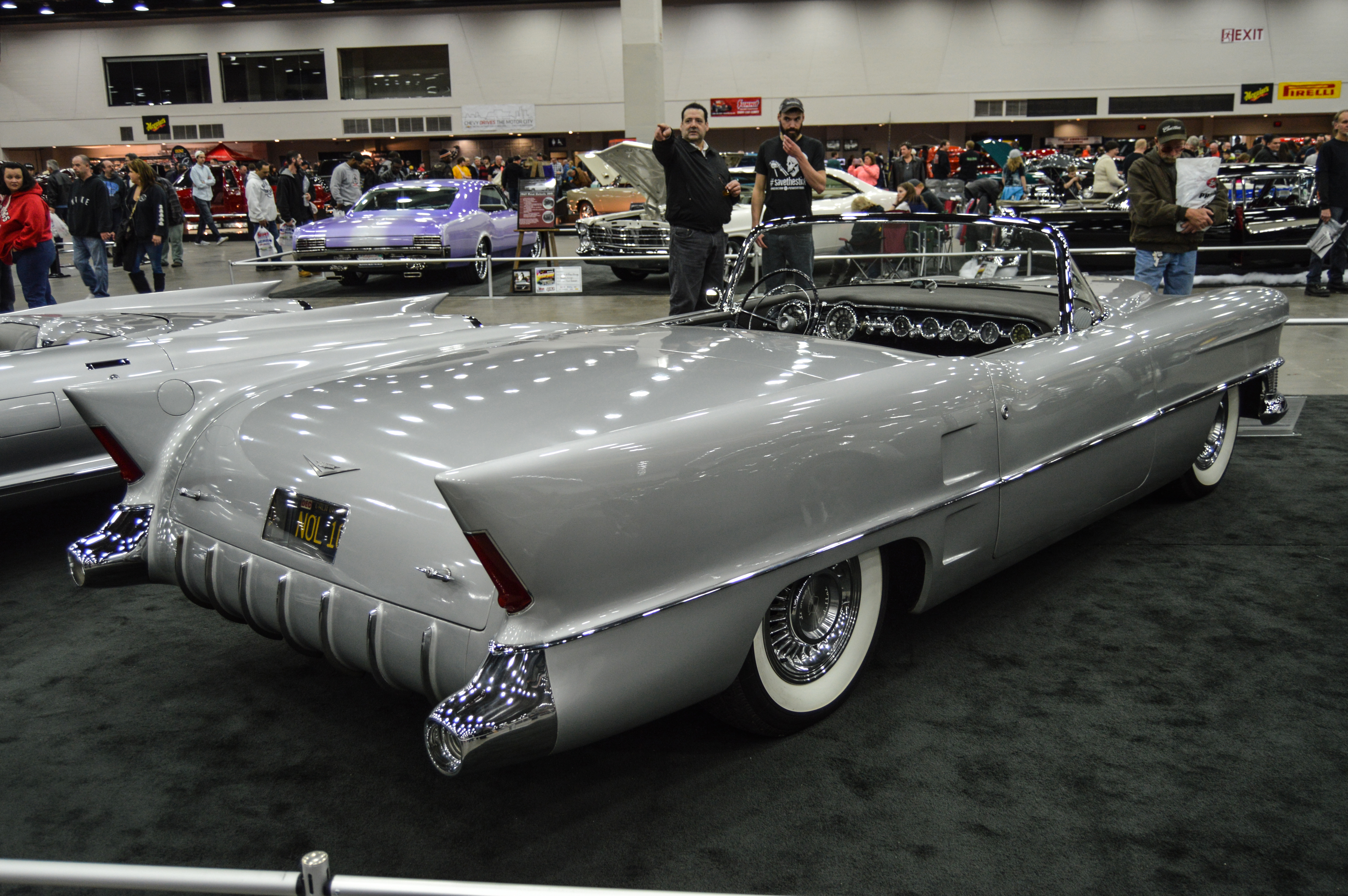
Rear view
