= Fanny Carrión de Fierro =

Ecuadorian poet, literary critic, essayist and university professor

- Born: Fanny Natalia Carrión de Fierro; 1936 (age 89–90)
- Occupation: Writer
- Writing career
- Notable work: Where Light Was Born (1999)

Fanny Carrión de Fierro (born 1936) is an Ecuadorian poet, literary critic, essayist and university professor.

== Life and career ==
She received a Doctorate in Literature from the Pontifical Catholic University of Ecuador (Quito, 1981), as well as a Master of Arts degree from the University of California at Berkeley, and a Bachelor's degree (Licenciatura) in Education from the Central University of Ecuador.

She has written and published essays on several topics, including political, cultural and social issues. These include essays on gender issues, human rights, children's rights, the indigenous movement, and linguistics.

Her poems have also been included in several anthologies, including These Are Not Sweet Girls: Poetry by Latin American Women (1994) and Eye to Eye-Women: Their Words and Worlds (1997).

In the fall 2006 elections, she wrote and published electronically an essay titled "Towards the Fifth Power", on the importance of civil society participation to consolidate democracy.

Carrión de Fierro has been a university professor at several universities in Ecuador and the United States. She is currently a professor at the Pontifical Catholic University of Ecuador (Quito). She has also been a visiting professor and Fulbright Scholar at Keene State College in New Hampshire, a visiting professor at Willamette University in Oregon, and a professor at several other universities in Ecuador.

She has been on the board of the Association of College Professors of the Pontifical Catholic University of Ecuador in Quito. She is also on the board on several development non-governmental organizations. Member of the "Grupo America" literary group of Ecuador, and the Casa de la Cultura Ecuatoriana (Ecuadorian House of Culture), Literature Section.

== Personal life ==
Fanny Carrión de Fierro's parents were Luis Enrique Carrión Carvajal and Leonor Acosta from Ibarra, Ecuador.

Carrión de Fierro married Gustavo Adolfo Fierro Zevallos (Ph.D. in linguistics). They had four children: Gustavo Adolfo, Patricia Natalia, Luis Alberto and Pablo Fernando.

== University Professor ==
Dr. Fanny Carrión de Fierro has been a university professor at several Universities in Ecuador and the United States. Currently, she is a professor at the Pontifical Catholic University of Ecuador.

== Selected bibliography ==
=== Short stories ===
- The Golden Ear of Corn and Other Stories, bilingual collection of short stories. Centro de Publicaciones de la Pontificia Universidad Católica del Ecuador, October 2010.

=== Poetry ===
- En la Voz del Silencio (1980)
- Ten poems translated into English included in the anthology These are not Sweet Girls, Poetry by Latin American Women, edited by Marjorie Agosin (1994) ISBN 1-877727-38-5
- Where light was born: A personal anthology of selected poems by Fanny Carrión de Fierro (1999; translated by Sally Cheney Bell) ISBN 1-882063-47-3
- Donde nació la Luz: Antología Personal (2000) ISBN 9978-41-379-0
- Desde el beso del tiempo and Esta voz, in Poetic Voices without Borders, edited by Robert L. Girón (2005) ISBN 1-928589-30-8
- Alfa Amor, Donde Nació la Luz and Geografía del Corazón, in Poetic Voices without Borders 2, edited by Robert L. Girón (2009) ISBN 978-1-928589-43-3

=== Criticism ===
- José de la Cuadra: Precursor del realismo mágico hispanoamericano (1993) ISBN 9978-77-029-1
- Los Sangurimas, novela precursora de Cien Años de soledad, an essay about the novel "Los Sangurimas" by José de la Cuadra
- Cien Años de Soledad, Historia y Mito de lo Americano, in: Lectura de García Márquez (Doce Estudios), edited by Manuel Corrales Pascual (Quito: Centro de Publicaciones de la Pontifica Universidad Católica de Ecuador, 1975)

== Awards ==
- Gabriela Mistral National Poetry Award (1958, 1961, 1981 and 1985)
- National Poetry Award of Ecuador (1962)
- "Juana de Ibarbuoru" Poetry Prize, Montevideo (1995).
