= Kenneth Fiero =

American politician (1911–1987)

Member of the Wyoming House of Representatives
- In office 1955–1955

Personal details
- Born: February 14, 1911 Lafayette, Louisiana, U.S.
- Died: November 2, 1987 (aged 76)
- Party: Republican
- Spouse: Freda Slade (m. 1935)
- Children: 4
- Education: University of Wyoming

Kenneth Fiero (February 14, 1911 – November 2, 1987) was an American rancher, businessman, and politician who served as a Republican member of the Wyoming House of Representatives.

== Life and career ==
Fiero was born in Lafayette, Louisiana. He attended the University of Wyoming.

He graduated from the University of Wyoming. He was a rancher and businessman in Uinta County. In 1955, Fiero was elected to the Wyoming House of Representatives, representing Uinta County, Wyoming.

He had three sons. Fiero died on November 2, 1987 at the Evanston Regional Hospital, at the age of 76.
