= Rodrigo Fierro =

Rodrigo Fierro Benítez (born 1930 in Ambato) is an Ecuadorian doctor, writer and politician. He served as the Minister of Public Health of the Republic of Ecuador during the government of Jaime Roldós Aguilera, from 1979 to 1981.

He received the Bolton S. Corson Medal in 1993.

== Sources ==
1. Carlos Emilio Grijalva, "Genealogía de la familia Fierro, Hierro y del Hierro", Tulcán, junio de 1937.
2. "Rodrigo Fierro Benítez, Estoy Haciendo una vida de Perseguido", Revista "La Casa", No. 67, CCE, Quito, 2009.
3. http://www.conmemoracionescivicas.gov.ec/es/publicaciones/cc31.pdf
4. http://www.fi.edu/winners/1993/fierrobenitez_rodrigo.faw?winner_id=2790

== Bibliography ==
Rodrigo Fierro-Benítez, John B. Stanbury, Andries Querido, Leslie Degroot, Rodrigo Albán and Jorge Córdova, "Endemic Cretinism in the Andean Region of Ecuador", Journal of Clinical Endocrinology & Metabolism Vol. 30, No. 2, 228–236.

Rodrigo Fierro-Benitez M.D., Ignacio Ramirez M.D., Juan Garcés M.D., Carlos Jaramillo M.D., Fausto Moncayo M.D., and John B. Stanbury M.D., "The clinical pattern of cretinism as seen in highland Ecuador", American Journal of Clinical Nutrition, Vol 27, 531–543.

Rodrigo Fierro Benítez, "Capítulos de la biopatología andina: los desórdenes por deficiencia de yodo", Universidad Andina Simón Bolívar/Corporación Editora Nacional, 1993.
