= Michelle Fierro =

American artist

- Born: January 6, 1967 (age 59); Los Angeles, California
- Known for: Painting

Michelle Fierro (born January 6, 1967) is an American artist.

== Life ==
Fierro went to college at California State University, Fullerton in 1992, and then the Claremont Graduate school in 1995. She is married and currently works and lives in Los Angeles with two children. Fierro was featured in the book 25 Women In Art by Dave Hickey.

== Exhibitions ==
- 2002 Michelle Fierro: Paintings, (solo), Brian Gross Fine Art, Los Angeles
- 2011 Goldmine: Selections from the Michael and Sirje Gold Collection, California State University Long Beach
- 2017 Michelle Fierro: New Paintings, (solo), c.nichols project, Los Angeles

== Collections ==
Some of her works may be viewed at Kent State University OH, University of North Texas Denton TX, California State University Paintings from LA in San Bernardino, and The Sensation Line Denver Museum of Contemporary Art.

Her work is held in the collections of:

- Los Angeles Museum of Contemporary Art
- Museum of Contemporary Art, North Miami
- Orange County Museum of Art
