= Pontiac Fiero =

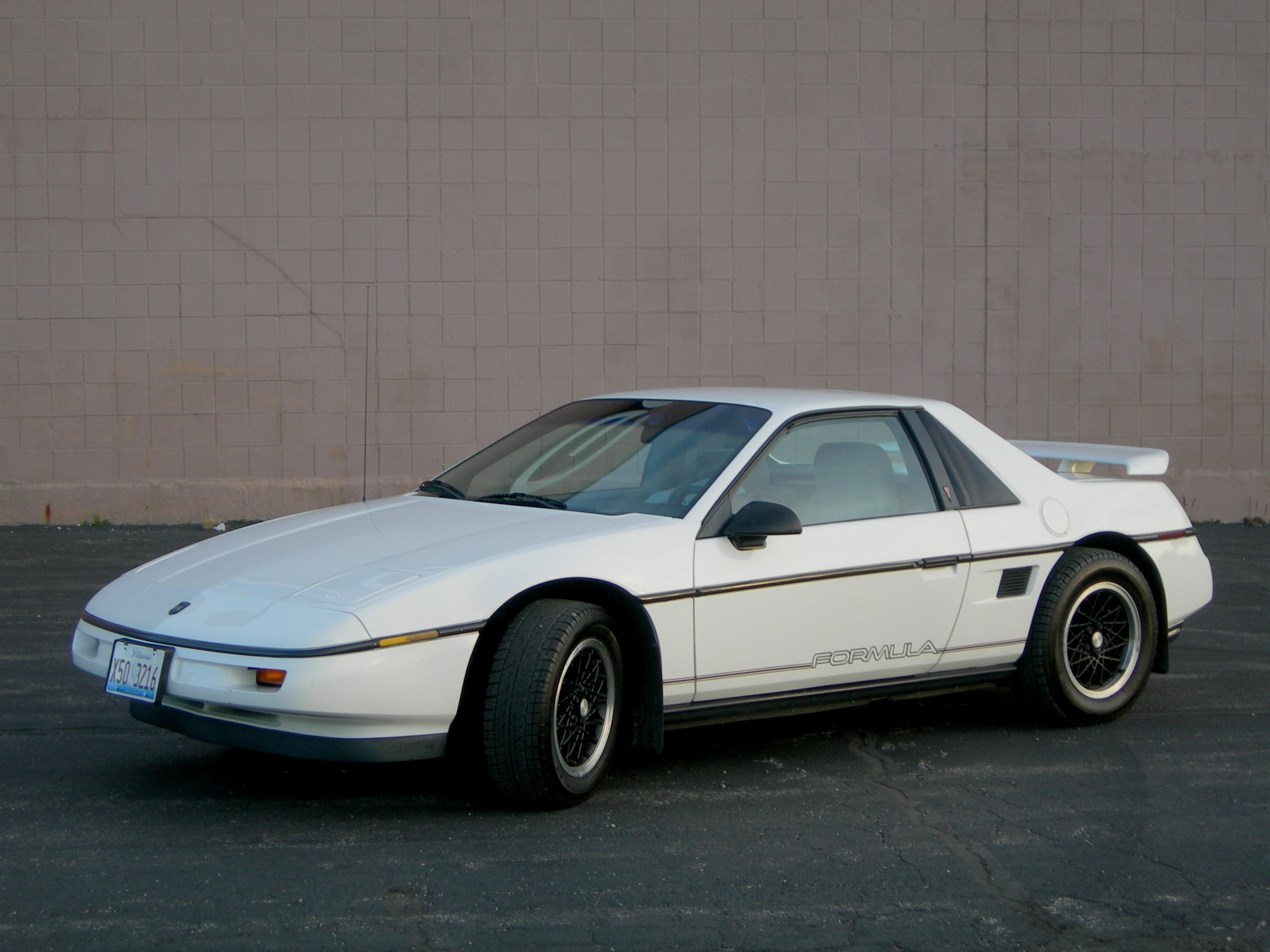
- 1988 Fiero Formula

Overview
- Manufacturer: Pontiac (General Motors)
- Production: August 1983 – August 16, 1988; 370,168 produced
- Model years: 1984 – 1988
- Assembly: United States: Pontiac, Michigan (Pontiac Assembly)
- Designer: Hulki Aldikacti; George Milidrag

Body and chassis
- Class: Sports car (S)
- Body style: 2-door fastback coupé; 2-door notchback coupé
- Layout: Transverse mid-engine, rear-wheel drive
- Platform: P-body

Powertrain
- Engine: 2.5 L (151 cu in) LR8 I4; 2.8 L (173 cu in) L44 V6
- Transmission: 3-speed THM-125 automatic; 4-speed Muncie manual; 5-speed Getrag 282 manual; 5-speed Isuzu manual

Dimensions
- Wheelbase: 2,373 mm (93.4 in)
- Length: 1984–1986: 4,072 mm (160.3 in); 1987–1988: 4,144 mm (163.1 in); 1987–1988 GT: 4,193 mm (165.1 in)
- Width: 1984–1986: 1,750 mm (68.9 in); 1987–1988: 1,753 mm (69.0 in)
- Height: 1,191 mm (46.9 in)
- Curb weight: 1,116 to 1,265 kg (2,460 to 2,789 lb)

Chronology
- Successor: Pontiac Solstice

The Pontiac Fiero is a rear mid-engine, light economy car manufactured and marketed by Pontiac for model years 1984–1988. Originally designed as a small sports car, it was subsequently revised for production into an economical commuter car with modest performance aspirations. The Fiero was Pontiac's first two-seater since their 1926 to 1938 coupes, and the first mass-produced, rear mid-engine car by any American manufacturer.

In addition to using 4- and 6-cylinder engines to help Pontiac meet America's 'CAFE' average fuel economy requirements, the Fiero's chassis and structure technology used non-load-bearing, composite body-panels, contributing to the car's lightweight and its unique selling proposition. Its mild performance, reliability and safety issues were common points of criticism. Pontiac engineers subsequently modified the design over its life to resolve reliability and safety issues and to enhance performance in an attempt to reposition the two-seater closer to the implications of its sporty configuration.

The Fiero 2M4 (two-seat, mid-engine, four-cylinder) placed on Car and Driver magazine's Ten Best list for 1984, and was the Official Pace Car of the Indianapolis 500 for 1984. A total of 370,168 Fieros were manufactured over five years' production. The Fiero was discontinued after 1988 after annual sales fell steadily.

== History and design ==
The Fiero was conceived as a small, two-seat sports car with all new suspension and a V6 engine. While General Motors's management were opposed to a two-seater sports car that might compete with the Chevrolet Corvette, young Pontiac engineers in 1978 were able to sell the Fiero concept to the corporation as a fuel-efficient four-cylinder "commuter car" that just happened to have two seats, as compared to the more common muscle cars of the era. When the engineers built a running prototype in less than six months, it was given the green light for production.

GM management perceived the oil crisis as a market opportunity for a fuel-efficient sporty commuter car. The Fiero was redesigned to use a fuel efficient version of GM's 2.5 L (151 cu in) existing four-cylinder Iron Duke engine capable of 31 mpg_{‑US} (7.6 L/100 km; 37 mpg_{‑imp}) in the city and 50 mpg_{‑US} (4.7 L/100 km; 60 mpg_{‑imp}) on the highway with the economy-ratio transmission option. The fuel economy was considered impressive for a 2.5 L engine of the period, though the three-speed automatic reduced highway mileage to only 32 mpg_{‑US} (7.4 L/100 km; 38 mpg_{‑imp}). With respect to fuel economy, the Fiero appealed to a market niche distinct from the Corvette's.

Pontiac assigned oversight of the Fiero project to Hulki Aldikacti, a Turkish born executive with over twenty years of experience. Its design was unusual for GM, and stood out from their other products. The two-seater's development budget from design to plant retooling, was 400 million dollars, a fraction of a typical GM development budget.

Aldikacti's initial challenge was navigating GM's corporate structure, which split its engineers into two categories: the car engineers who would create blueprints for the car, and manufacturing engineers who would work out the fabrication and assembly issues. Fiero blueprints were repeatedly passed back and forth between the two engineering branches, wasting time and money. Aldikacti eventually sat the two engineering teams directly next to one another, allowing for no excuses as to why there was "no build" after his design was done. To remain within GM's budget, several design changes were required for production; for instance, despite his long-standing interest in manufacturing body panels from plastic, Aldikacti consented to metal body pieces, the dies for which were much less costly.

As the prototypes took shape, the tight budget continued to force compromises to the original design, particularly on Aldikacti's dream of a high-performance, aluminum-block V6; the expense of developing a new engine would more than double the production cost of the entire car itself. Instead, Aldikacti was obliged to accept the existing four-cylinder engine GM produced for Pontiac, the "Iron Duke," nicknamed for its heavy iron block.

Aldikacti's unorthodox design methods and personal manner resulted in friction with GM's large bureaucracy and he was told by counterparts at other GM divisions three times that the Fiero project had been cancelled by corporate management. However, the project was kept alive by high-ranked defenders, particularly William Hoglund, who became Pontiac's division chief in 1980 when the brand's popularity was in decline due to its outdated cars. In 1983, Hoglund told his top three dozen staffers that Pontiac would rebrand its image with cars that were exciting and different — terms that described Aldikacti's "commuter car." In order to meet his marketing team's goal of 100,000 cars a year, Hoglund negotiated a deal to reopen a shuttered plant in Pontiac, Michigan. He and his staff wanted to prove that management and labor could cooperate rather than using robots on the assembly line, which GM's top executives wanted. Hoglund also allowed the hourly paid workers to choose the two-seater's name, which resulted in the name "Fiero." The word Fiero means "very proud," "fierce," "bold," "haughty," "cruel," or "severe" in Italian, and "wild," "fierce," or "ferocious" in Spanish. Alternative names considered for the car were Sprint (which had previously been used on a GMC model and would later end up being used for a Chevrolet instead), P3000, Pegasus, Fiamma, Sunfire (a name which would later be applied to another Pontiac), and Firebird XP.

A mid-engine layout was chosen to reduce both aerodynamic drag and vehicle weight; to improve fuel efficiency, and to offer handling, traction, and braking benefits. The performance potential of the mid-engine layout was not realized when the Fiero debuted: As cost-saving measures, the original brake and suspension designs were replaced by existing components from the X and T platforms. The sharing of components with other GM cars meant the rear suspension and powertrain were nearly identical to that of the Phoenix with one exception: the Fiero used the front suspension components of the Phoenix for the rear, including tie rod ends attached to a "steering knuckle" hard-mounted to the engine cradle. As a result of this components sharing, the handling abilities of the Fiero were no better than other contemporary small coupes.

The Fiero received positive reviews from Motor Trend for its handling as well as negative reviews for its disappointing performance. Despite the performance criticism, the Fiero sold well and although Pontiac operated three factory shifts during 1984, they could not meet initial demand. By 1985, demand for improved engine power and better performance increased. Pontiac responded by introducing the GT model which included upgraded suspension tuning, wider tires, and a V6 engine featuring 43 hp (32 kW) more than the base four-cylinder. In 1988, changes for the GT included a completely redesigned suspension (and parts of the space frame) along with two-piece brake calipers and upgraded brake rotors — all of which had been part of the initial design. The available I4 and V6 engines in all models benefited from evolutionary improvements, but the planned availability of turbochargers and newer DOHC engines did not happen before production ended. Despite the design and performance finally meeting potential, sales had declined and GM ended production.

== Production years ==
=== 1984 ===
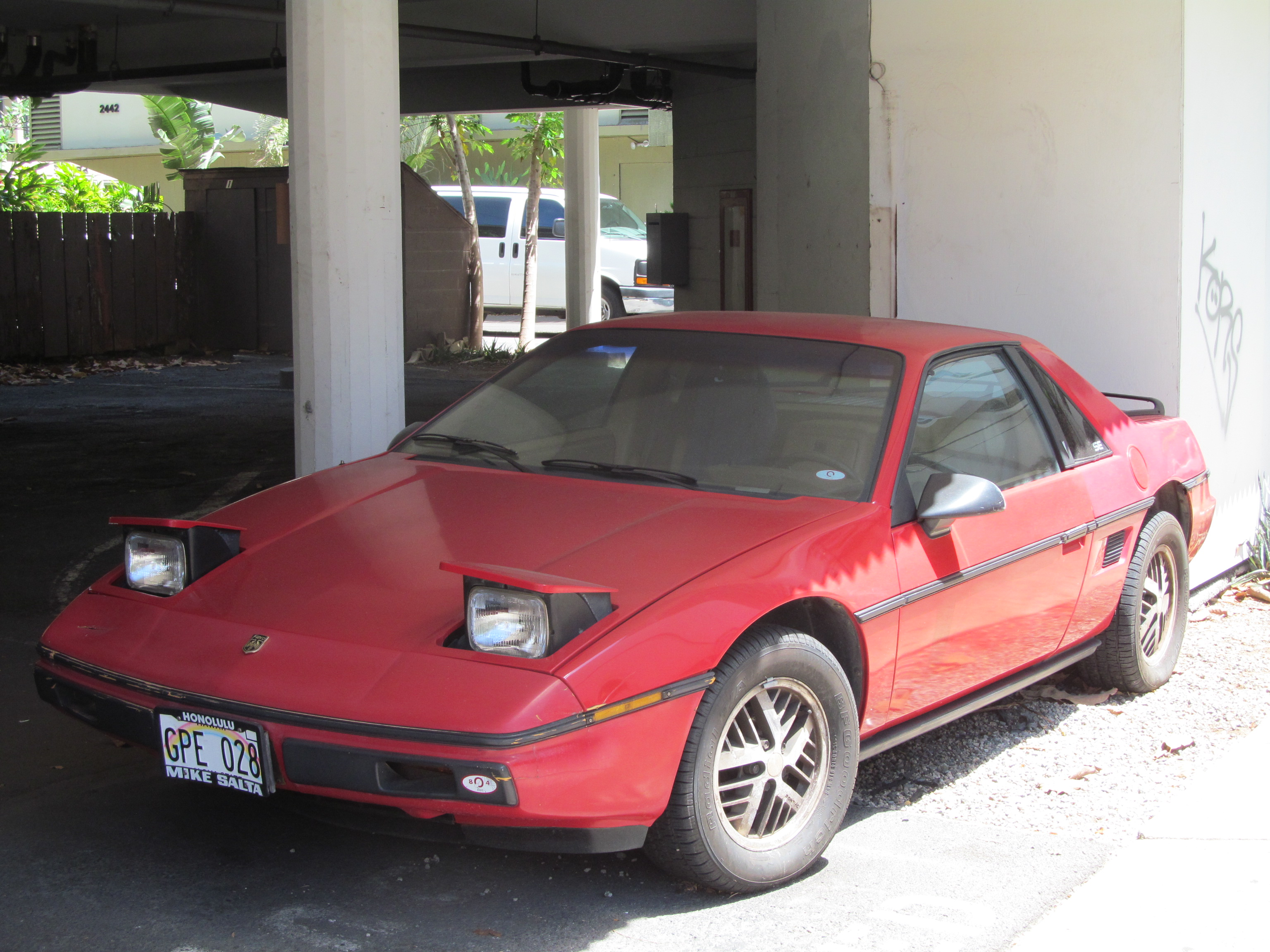
1984 Fiero 2M4 SE

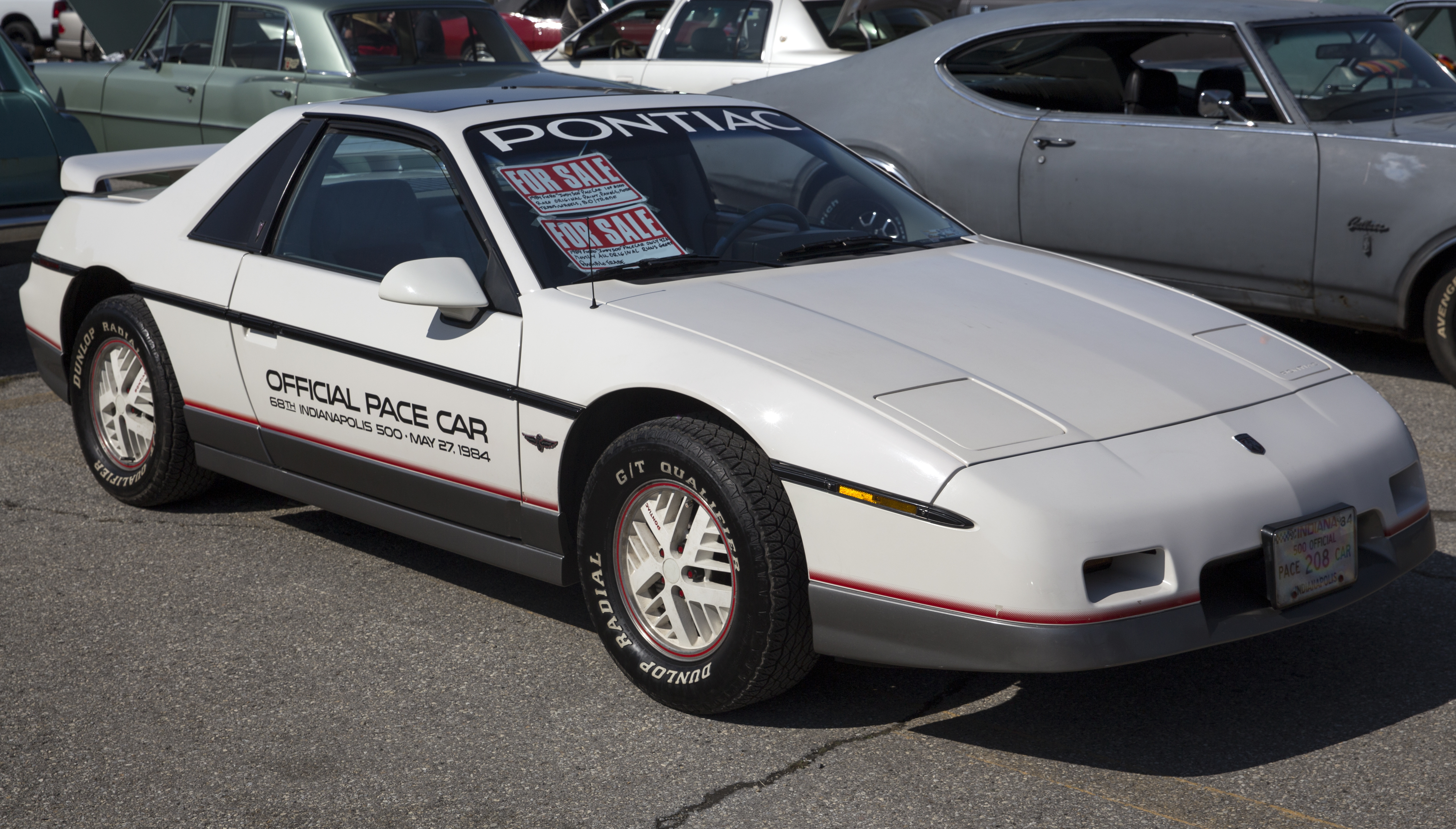
1984 Pontiac Fiero Indy Pace Car replica

The Fiero began production in August 1983. In an effort to sell the car as economically sensible, GM equipped and sold the Fiero as a commuter car; although the marketing build-up leading to initial release indicated anything but a regular commuter. The car also proved uncomfortable for some drivers because of the lack of power steering. At the beginning of production, the Fiero was only available in Red (M71) and White (M40) colors with Black (M41) and Light Gray Metallic (M14) introduced later, the paint shop was only able to handle four different colors at a time. All 1984 models came with the same 2.5 L I4.

Although sales literature listed only two models available in 1984, there were at least three models available with different optional packages. There was the Fiero Coupe, the Sport Coupe and the SE. The Fiero Coupe, also called "Fuel Economy Leader", came with the MY-8 4-speed manual transaxle that had a 0.73 overdrive top gear along with a high mpg 3.32:1 axle ratio. This gave it an EPA highway/city rating of 50/31 mpg. Air conditioning and automatic transaxle could not be ordered. The starting price for the Fiero Coupe was $7,999. The Fiero Sport Coupe, also referred to as the "base car", came with the M-19 four-speed manual with a 0.81 top gear along with 4.10:1 differential, giving it better acceleration at the cost of fuel economy, 42/26 mpg. An automatic 3-speed transmission, MD-9 Hydramatic 125-C, was available along with A/C which was shared with the Pontiac Sunbird. The starting price was $8,499 ($26,338 in 2025 dollars) for the Sport Coupe. The top model was the Fiero SE, starting at $9,599 ($29,747 in 2025 dollars), it included the WS6 handling package along with other trim upgrades.

The marketing included title sponsorship of Daryl Hall & John Oates tour supporting the release of their Big Bam Boom album. From November 1984 through 1985, each tour venue had Fiero banners and signage above the main stage, new Fieros on display, and Pontiac dealer ticket giveaways. Sales managers at Pontiac dealerships also received a limited edition "Pontiac Fiero Presents Daryl Hall & John Oates" vinyl greatest hits album enticing them to participate in the sponsorship tour. The LP was Rock 'n Soul Part 1. The album cover featured Hall & Oates standing with a red 1984 Fiero SE.

For marketing purposes, the 1984 base model was featured in a 1983 episode of the television show The Fall Guy. The 1984 model line included a limited "Indy Pace Car" edition, consisting of an Indianapolis 500-themed option package on SE-model vehicles (a package that was specially reissued in 1985). Approximately 2,000 of these vehicles were sold. The Indy had aero body cladding and new front and rear fascias that would be used on the 1985 GT. Only the four-cylinder engine was available, though a few prototypes were fitted with a unique periscope-style inlet sprouting from the engine compartment and curving up and over the roof. This "periscope" style inlet was used on the three actual Indy Pace Cars used at the 1984 Indianapolis 500. This inlet scoop fed the 2.7 L (165 cu in) Super Duty engine which was only exclusive to the actual Pace Cars. The Super Duty engine was rated at 232 hp (173 kW) at 6,500 rpm and 210 lb⋅ft (280 N⋅m) of torque at 5,500 rpm. Pontiac's general manager Bill Hoglund nominated John Callies to drive the actual pace car at Indy. Callies was the factory's lead engineer on both the pace car and IMSA programs. The Fiero became the first 4-cylinder car to pace the 500 since a Stoddard-Dayton paced the 1914 race.

The production of the 1984 model ran from July 1983 until near the end of 1984. This resulted in Pontiac exceeding its first year goal of 80,000 units – 28,000 more than the initial estimate, and the most two-seater cars produced by any US manufacturer at the time.

1984 Fiero production
| VIN | Style | Cars produced |
|---|---|---|
| 1G2AE37RxEPxxxxxx | Fiero | 7,099 |
| 1G2AM37RxEPxxxxxx | Fiero Sport | 62,070 |
| 1G2AF37RxEPxxxxxx | Fiero SE | 65,671 |
| 1G2AF37RxEPxxxxxx | Fiero Indy | 2,000 |
| Total production | | 136,840 |

=== 1985 ===
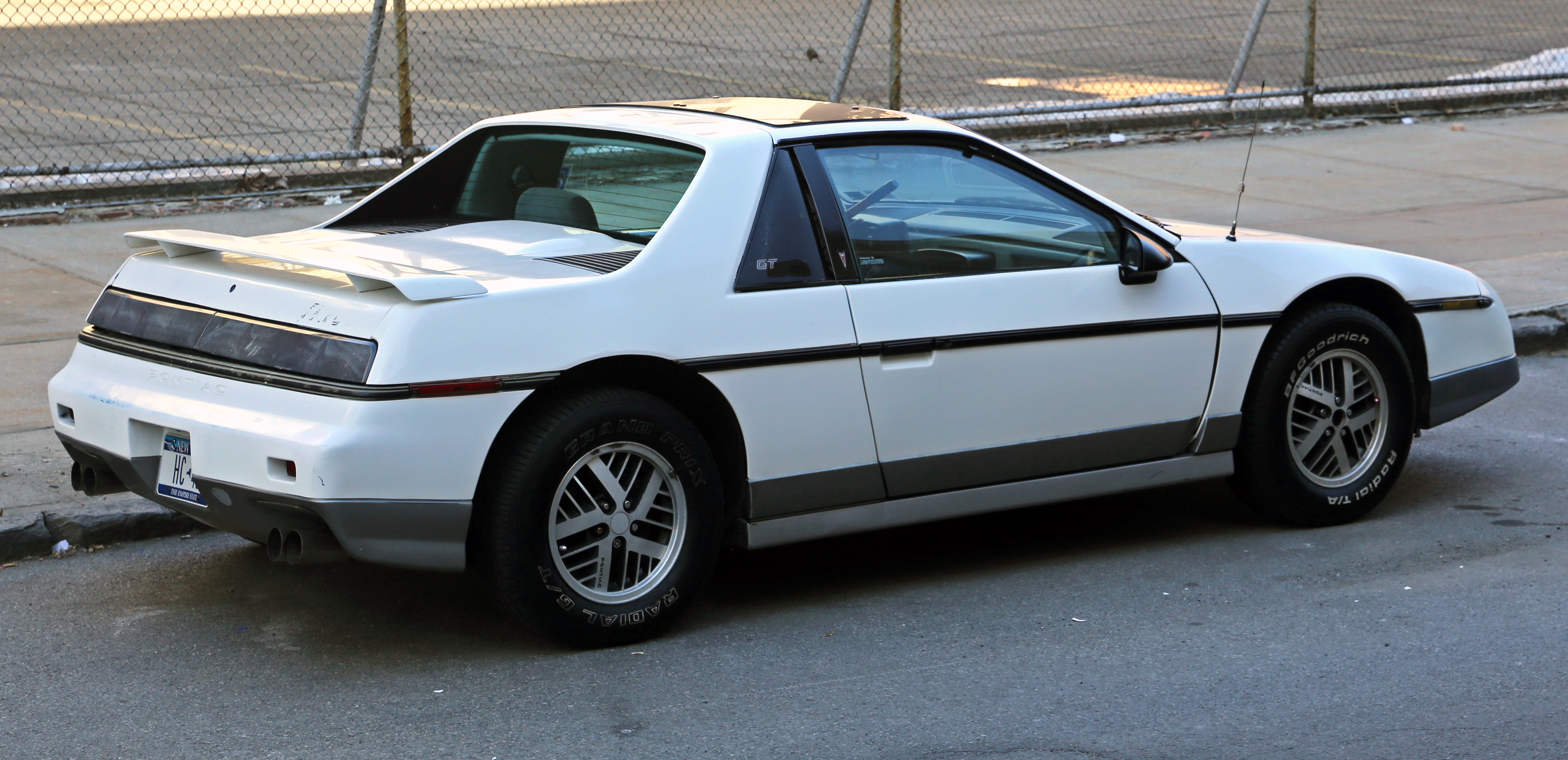
1985 Pontiac Fiero GT (rear)

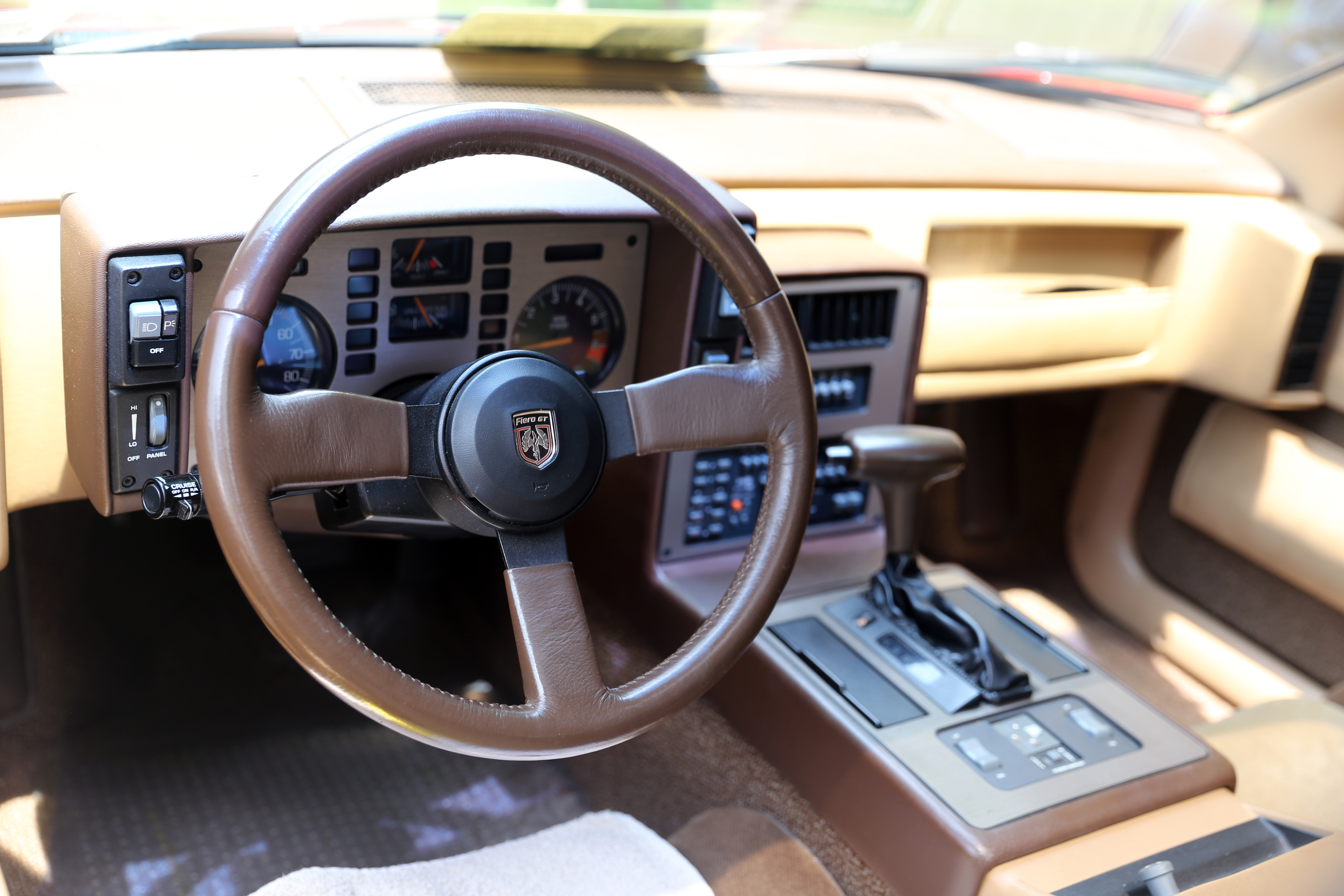
1985 Pontiac Fiero GT; dashboard

The 1985 Fiero did not appear in showrooms until January 1985, with the introduction of the GT model, which looked very similar to the 1984 Indy model without the decals or body color wheels. The three models and four colors from the previous year were still available and the complaint about insufficient power was addressed, much to the satisfaction of the general public. A 2.8 L (170 cu in) V6 engine rated at 140 hp (104 kW) at 5,200 rpm and 170 lb⋅ft (230 N⋅m) at 3,600 rpm became an available option, satisfying most critics of the base engine. The V6 was paired with a modified Muncie 4-speed transmission. The four-cylinder engine was slightly modified, adding roller lifters and resulting in a power increase of 2 hp (1.5 kW). It could now also be paired with a Japanese-designed Isuzu five-speed transmission as used in the J-body platform, also produced at the Muncie, Indiana plant.

1985 Fiero production
| VIN | Style | Cars produced |
|---|---|---|
| 1G2PE37R#FP2##### | Fiero | 5,280 |
| 1G2PM37R#FP2##### | Fiero Sport | 23,823 |
| 1G2PF37R#FP2##### | Fiero SE (I4) | 24,724 |
| 1G2PF379#FP2##### | Fiero SE (V6) | 24,724 |
| 1G2PG379#FP2##### | Fiero GT | 22,534 |
| Total production | | 76,371 |

=== 1986 ===
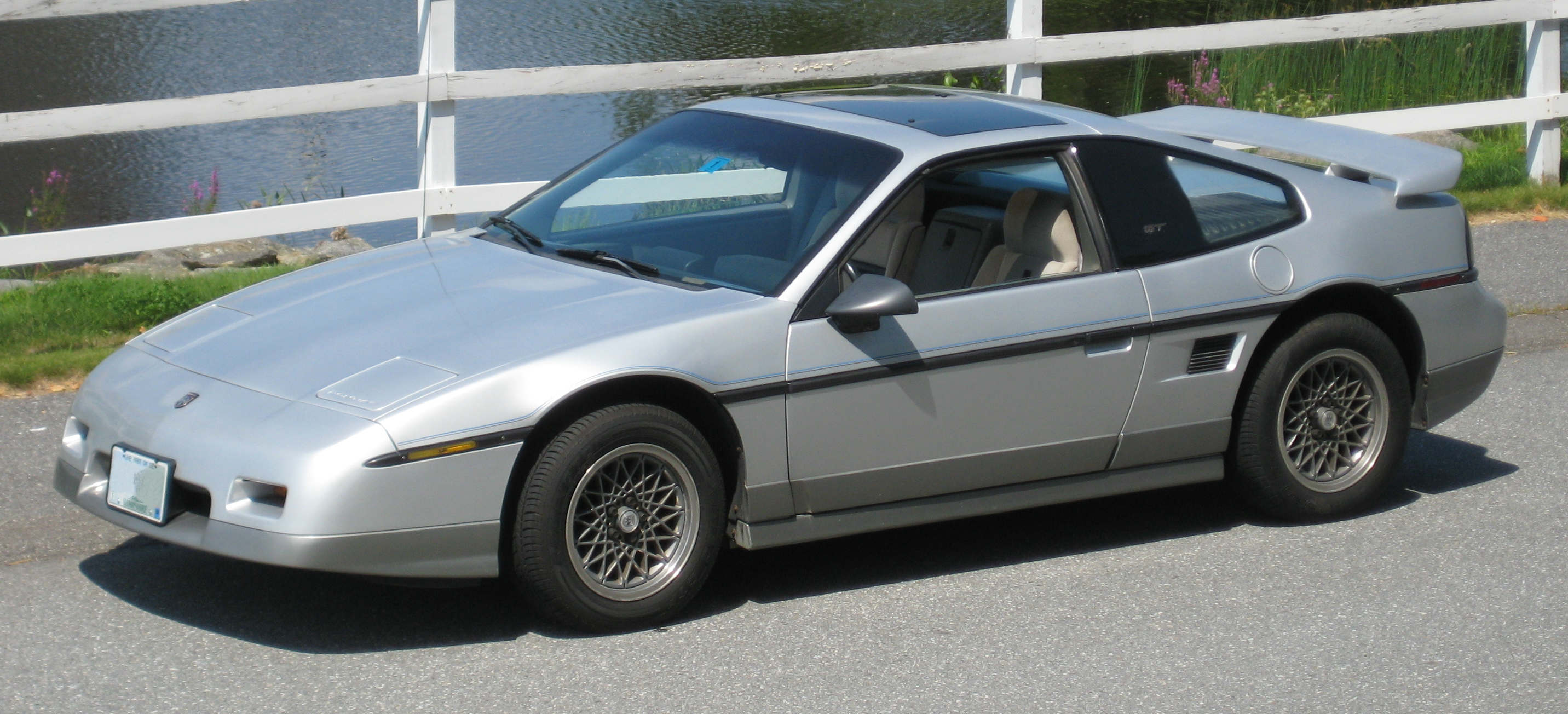
A fastback bodystyle would be offered for the Fiero GT from the 1986 model year.

The 1986 Fiero arrived on September 12, 1985; however, the GT model was not originally listed. The previous year's GT became the 1986 SE. The 1986 GT was delayed until January 3, 1986. This was the first time the fastback roofline was offered, sometimes referred to as a "1986 ½" model, as the new fastback body restyle was not yet ready for release at the start of the model year. Though originally conceived by Pontiac insiders as a new model, possibly called the "GTP" or "GTU," it has been said that GM management at the time felt that using "GTP" or "GTU" suggested a racing car, an image they did not want to promote.

Individuals present for the February 1984 unveiling of the new fastback roof style at GM's Arizona test track at first believed it was actually a new model of the Corvette. The Muncie/Getrag 5-speed transaxle, which did not arrive until June 1986, became the standard transaxle in V6 models. Models equipped with the four-cylinder engine received minor changes. They now came equipped standard with 14-inch wheels, with the SE also adopting the GT's aerodynamic front end and rear spoiler. Stereo speakers were now mounted in the sail panels instead of the headrests. The new Performance Sound System included a 5 ¼-inch subwoofer with an amplifier. Red and Light Gray Metallic colors were dropped in favour of Light Gold Metallic (M56), Silver Metallic (M16) and Bright Red (M81). The clutch hydraulic systems were redesigned with new master and slave cylinders and the optional air conditioner received a lighter compressor and condenser.

1986 Fiero production
| VIN | Style | Cars produced |
|---|---|---|
| 1G2PE37R#GP2##### | Fiero | 9,143 |
| 1G2PM37R#GP2##### | Fiero Sport | 24,866 |
| 1G2PF37R#GP2##### | Fiero SE (I4) | 32,305 |
| 1G2PF379#GP2##### | Fiero SE (V6) | 32,305 |
| 1G2PG119#GP2##### | Fiero GT | 17,891 |
| Total production | | 83,974 |

=== 1987 ===
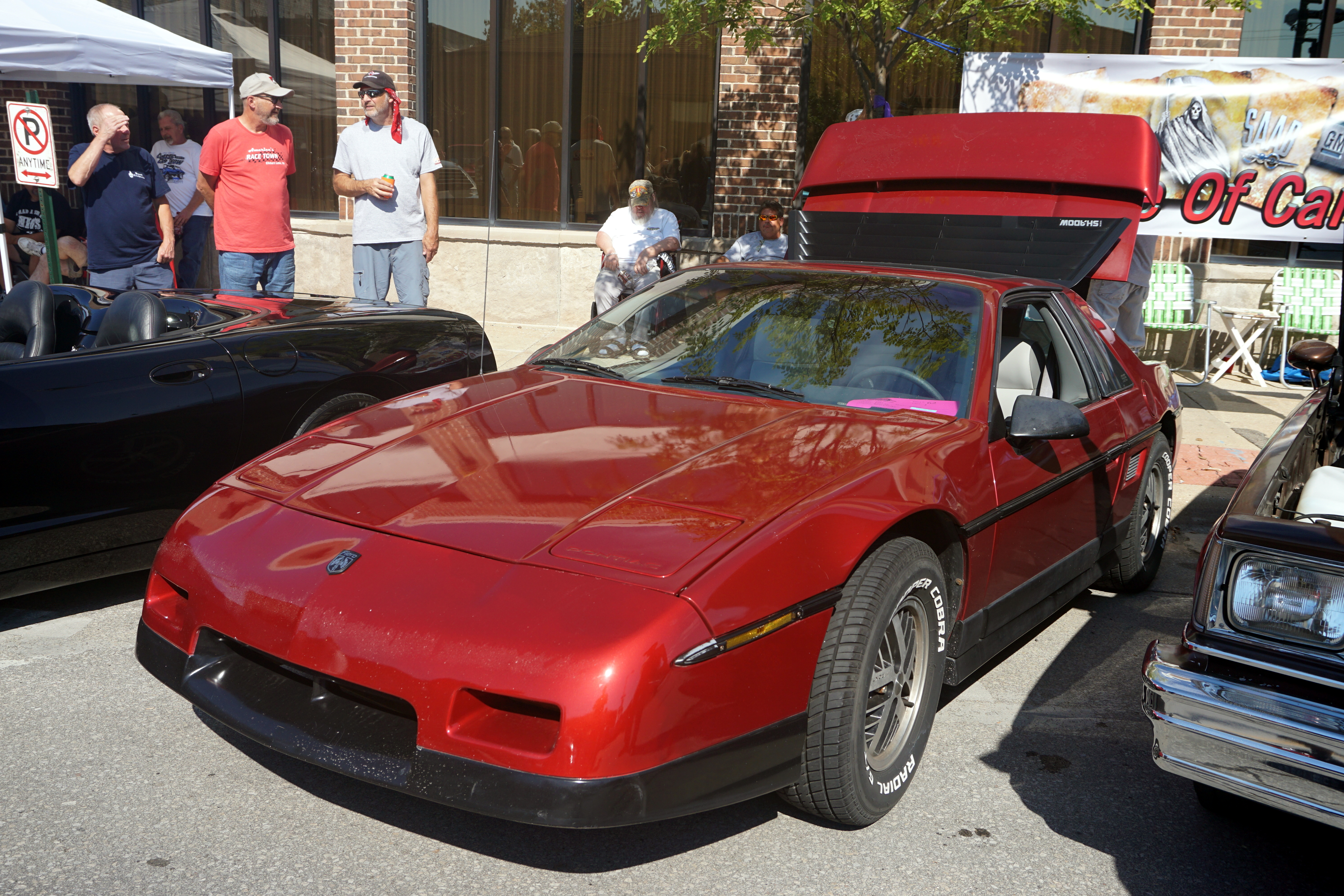
1987 Pontiac Fiero SE

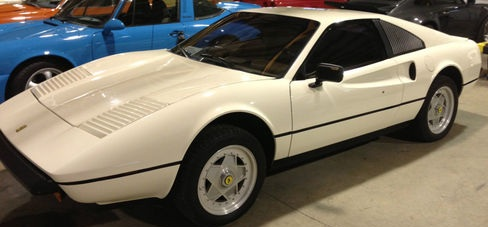
Pontiac Mera

1987 saw changes to the front and rear fascias on the "base coupe" with the SE and GT models keeping the same "Aero" nose. The new non-aero noses lost the black bumper pads of the earlier models and had a smoother look. The four-cylinder engine's power rating increased to 98 hp (73 kW) with some major modifications which included a roller cam, redesigned intake manifold, distributorless ignition system (DIS), open combustion chamber cylinder head and upgraded throttle-body fuel injection system. This was the last year for the spin-on oil filter on the four-cylinder. Bright Blue (M21) and Medium Red Metallic (M77) were added and replacing the ribbed black molding was the round style found on the GT models. As a side note, the SE models retained the ribbed molding, and added the aero nose found on the GT. Redesigned headlight motors appeared in 1987.

==== Fiero Mera body kit ====
Additionally, starting with the 1987 model Pontiac dealerships offered an upgrade in the form of an "option" that changed the original body to a Pininfarina Ferrari 308-type body, called the Fiero Mera. Corporate Concepts completed the "Mera" transformation and none were sold as kit form. The Mera body change was offered only on new Fieros, sold through Pontiac dealers and is considered a model in its own right. Only 247 Meras were produced by Corporate Concepts before production was halted when Corporate Concepts was sued by Ferrari.

1987 Fiero production
| VIN | Style | Cars produced |
|---|---|---|
| 1G2PE11R#HP2##### | Fiero | 23,603 |
| 1G2PM11R#HP2##### | Fiero Sport | 3,135 |
| 1G2PF11R#HP2##### | Fiero SE (I4) | 3,875 |
| 1G2PF119#HP2##### | Fiero SE (V6) | 3,875 |
| 1G2PG119#HP2##### | Fiero GT | 15,880 |
| 1G2PG119#HP2##### | Fiero Mera | 88 |
| Total production | | 46,581 |

=== 1988 ===
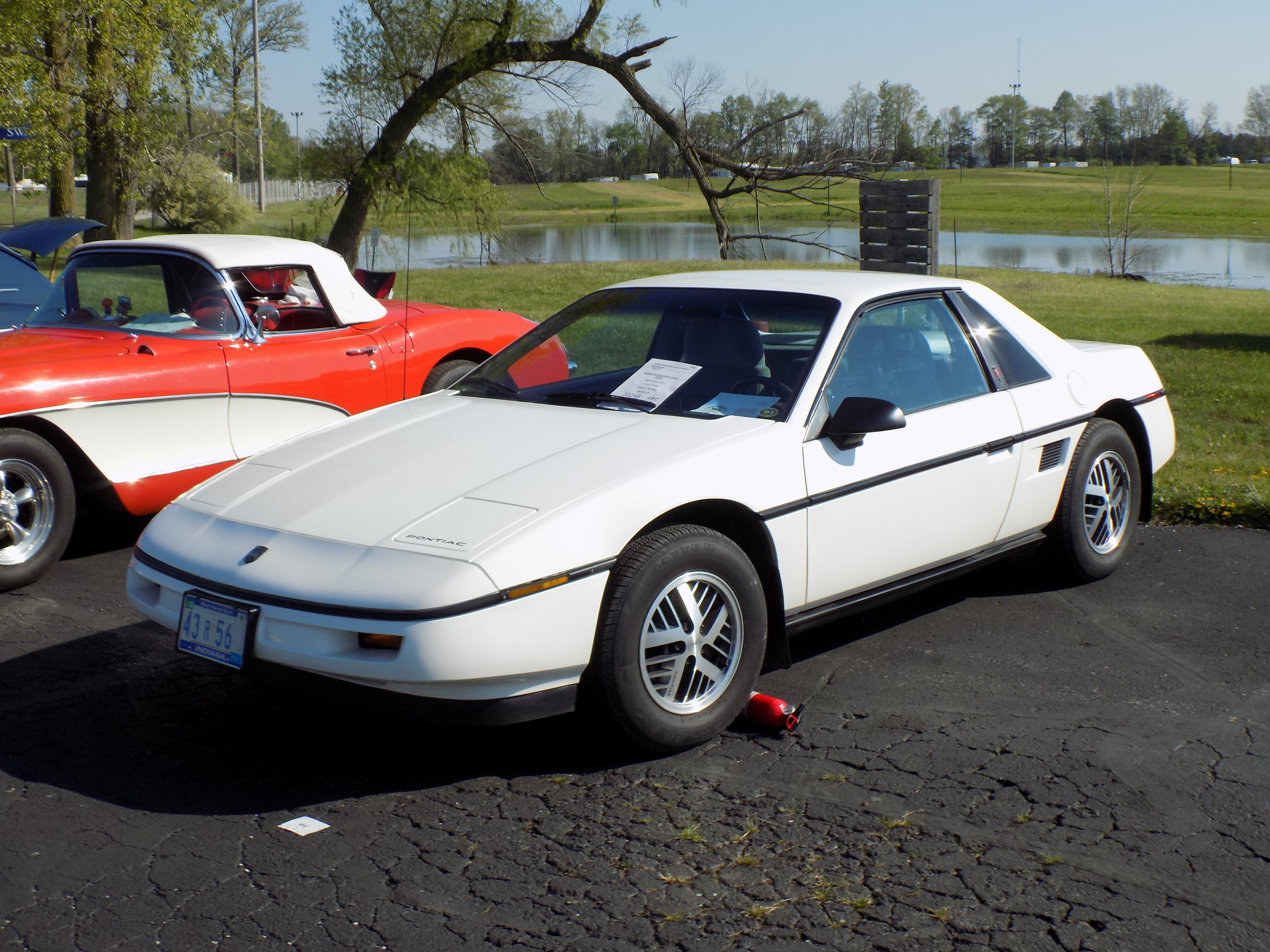
1988 Fiero

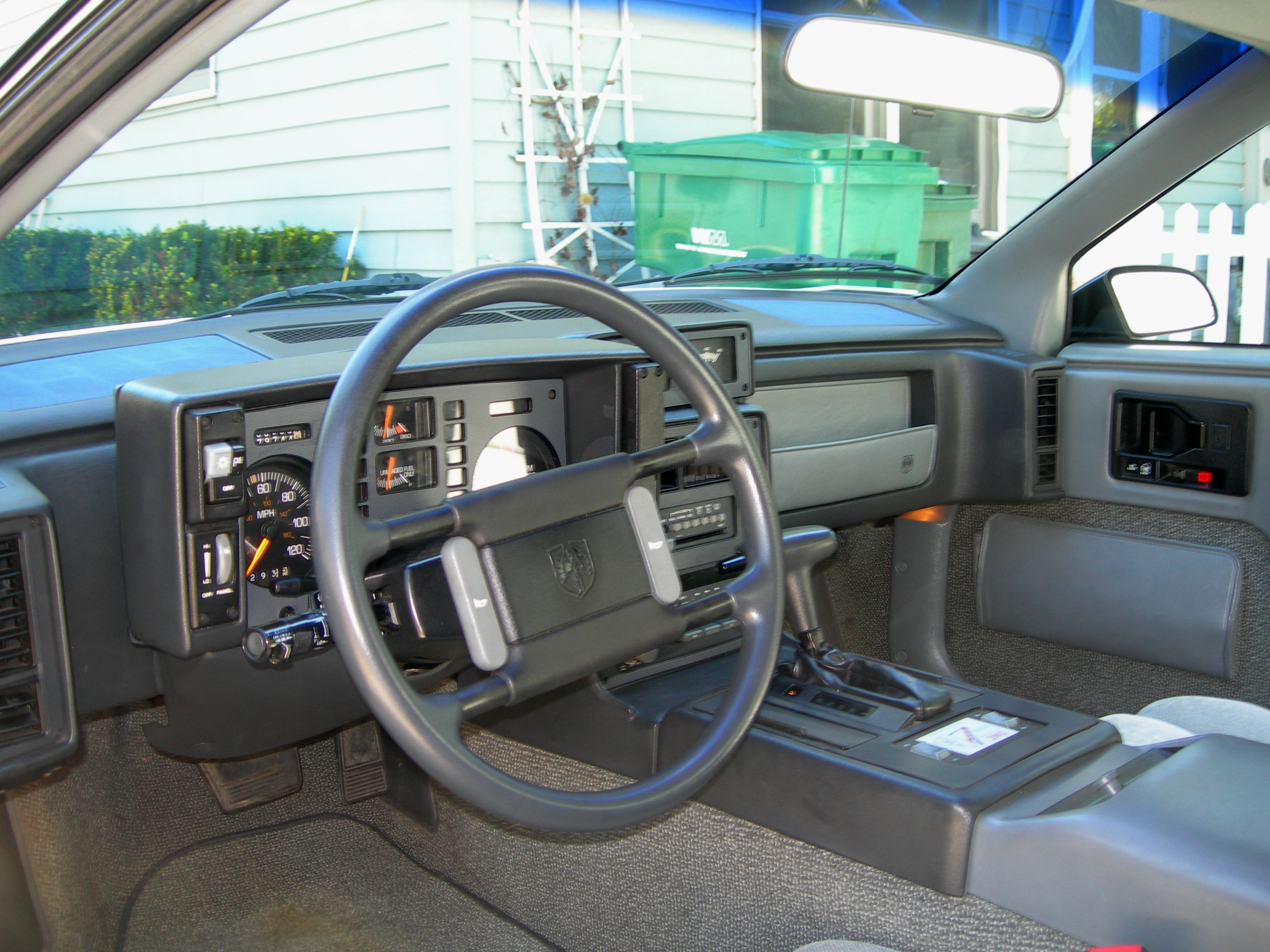
1988 Fiero Formula interior

The 1988 Fiero finally incorporated the suspension the Pontiac engineers had designed in the beginning. Up front were revised control arms and knuckles that reduced steering effort and improved the scrub radius. At the rear, a tri-link suspension with all new knuckles was installed. This new suspension came with staggered wheel sizes on WS6 suspension equipped models, with 15 in (380 mm) by 6 in (150 mm) wide wheels up front and 15 in (380 mm) by 7 in (180 mm) wide wheels in the rear for improved handling balance and to offset the slightly increased front track that resulted from the improvements. Topping off the package were the new vented disc brakes at all four corners, which addressed braking complaints of road testers. A variable effort electro-hydraulic power steering unit, the same design later found on the GM EV1, was also to be a late addition. This option never made it to production – one reason cited is that models with the prototype power steering were noted as being too loud. The four-cylinder engine received an in-pan oil filter element and balance shaft. A "Formula" option was added, which offered many of the GT features with the standard coupe body, including the 120 mph (190 km/h) speedometer, WS6 Suspension (which includes offset crosslace wheels) and the rear spoiler. 1988 marked the end of production for the Fiero. Improvements to suspension, brakes, steering, and improvements to both the four-cylinder and V6 engines took the car to a level far beyond the 1984 model that had received much criticism. The 1988 model was the only year a yellow exterior color was available as a factory option. On August 16, 1988, Pontiac assembled the last Fiero in Pontiac, Michigan.

1988 Fiero production
| VIN | Style | Cars produced |
|---|---|---|
| 1G2PE11R#JP2##### | Fiero | 13,910 |
| 1G2PE119#JP2##### | Fiero Formula | 5,484 |
| 1G2PG119#JP2##### | Fiero GT | 6,848 |
| 1G2PE119#JP2##### | Fiero Mera | 159 |
| Total production | | 26,402 |

The last Fiero built was presented to a GM assembler, and was kept pristine with just over 500 miles on the odometer. It was sold in December 2020 for $90,000.00.

=== 1989/1990 (prototype) ===
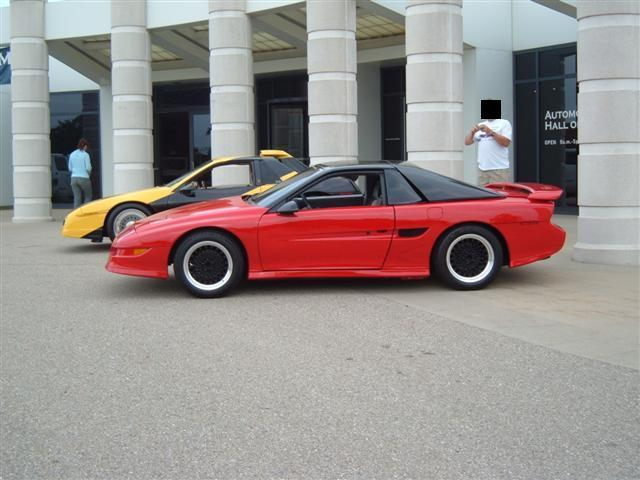
1989/1990 Fiero prototype, displayed at the 2006 Michigan Fiero Club show, "Fieros at the Hall"

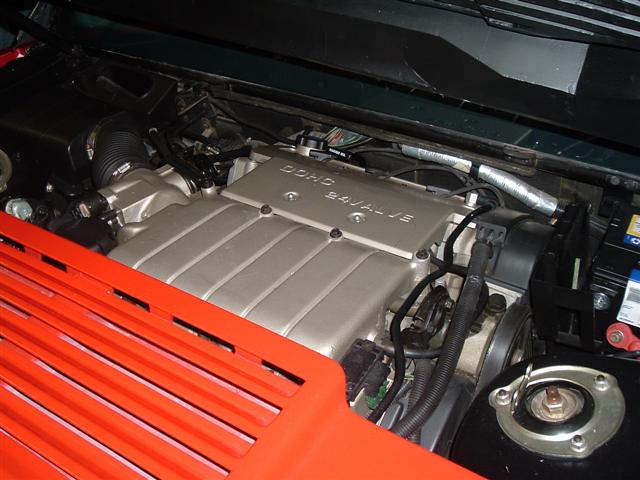
1989/1990 Fiero prototype, engine bay

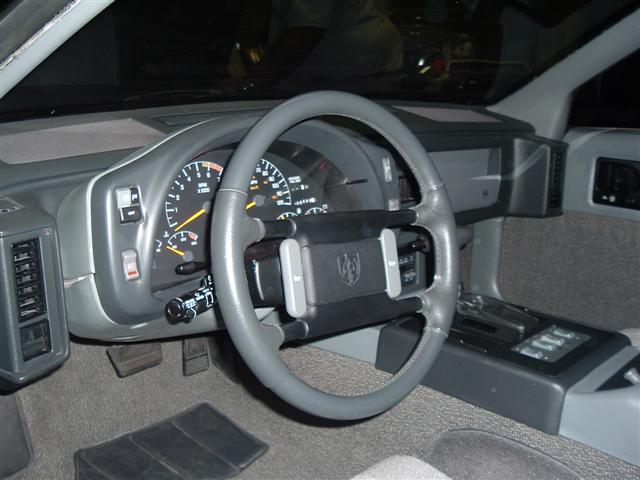
1989/1990 Fiero prototype, interior

A prototype of the never-produced 1989/1990 Fiero was displayed at the 20th Anniversary show in July 2003, at Fierorama 2005, at the Michigan show in 2006 and most recently at the 25th Anniversary Show in Pontiac, Michigan, in 2008. GM Heritage Center continues storing the 1989/1990 Fiero. Many of the 1989/1990 Fiero prototypes had been demolished in a scrap yard in Australia.

Much of its design influence is apparent in the Fourth Generation Firebird. New engines were proposed for the 1989/1990 model year, from the then new DOHC 190 bhp (140 kW) "Quad 4" four-cylinder as a base engine to replace the 2.5 L "Iron Duke" to a new 200+ hp DOHC V-6 for the GT models. Even a 231 CID (3.8 L) Buick Turbo V6 powered Fiero is rumored to have been seen at a test track. The single 1989/1990 Fiero GT prototype had an early version of the upcoming DOHC V-6 that would be put into production in the Grand Prix and Lumina Z34 in the early 1990s. This engine developed more than 200 hp (150 kW). GM cited slumping and unprofitable sales of the Fiero as the reason for its demise following its 5th model year.

1989/1990 Fiero production
| VIN | Style | Cars produced |
|---|---|---|
| 1G2PE11x#KP2##### | Fiero | 1 |

== Technical features ==
=== Engines ===
The Fiero was available with the 2.5 L (151 cu in) LR8 I4, and 2.8 L (173 cu in) L44 V6.

==== SD4 ====
The SD4 (Super Duty 4-cylinder) was the last in a line of high-performance Pontiac engines. A 2.7 L (165 cu in) 232 hp (173 kW) SD4 engine powered the 1984 Indy Fiero Pace Car to over 138 mph (222 km/h) during the race. The SD4 was never available in a production vehicle, however Pontiac's Performance Parts counter had all the SD4 parts available and one could garner a 2.7 L (165 cu in) 272 hp (203 kW) version and a 3.2 L (195 cu in) 330 hp (246 kW) version. All 2000 Indy Fiero replicas came with the 2.5 L (153 cu in) 92 hp (69 kW) Iron Duke engine.

=== Transmissions ===
==== Automatic ====
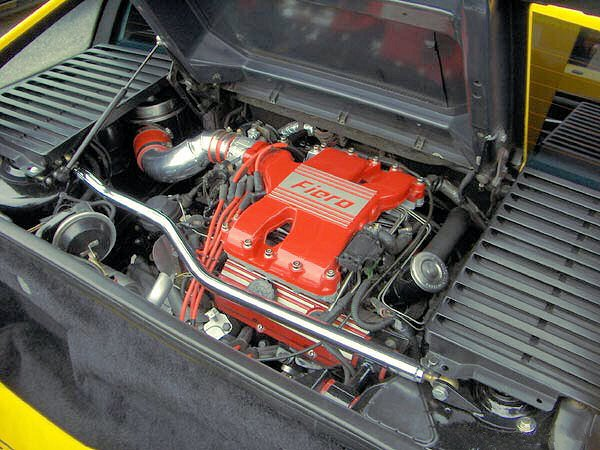
The Fiero's mid-mounted 2.8 L V6

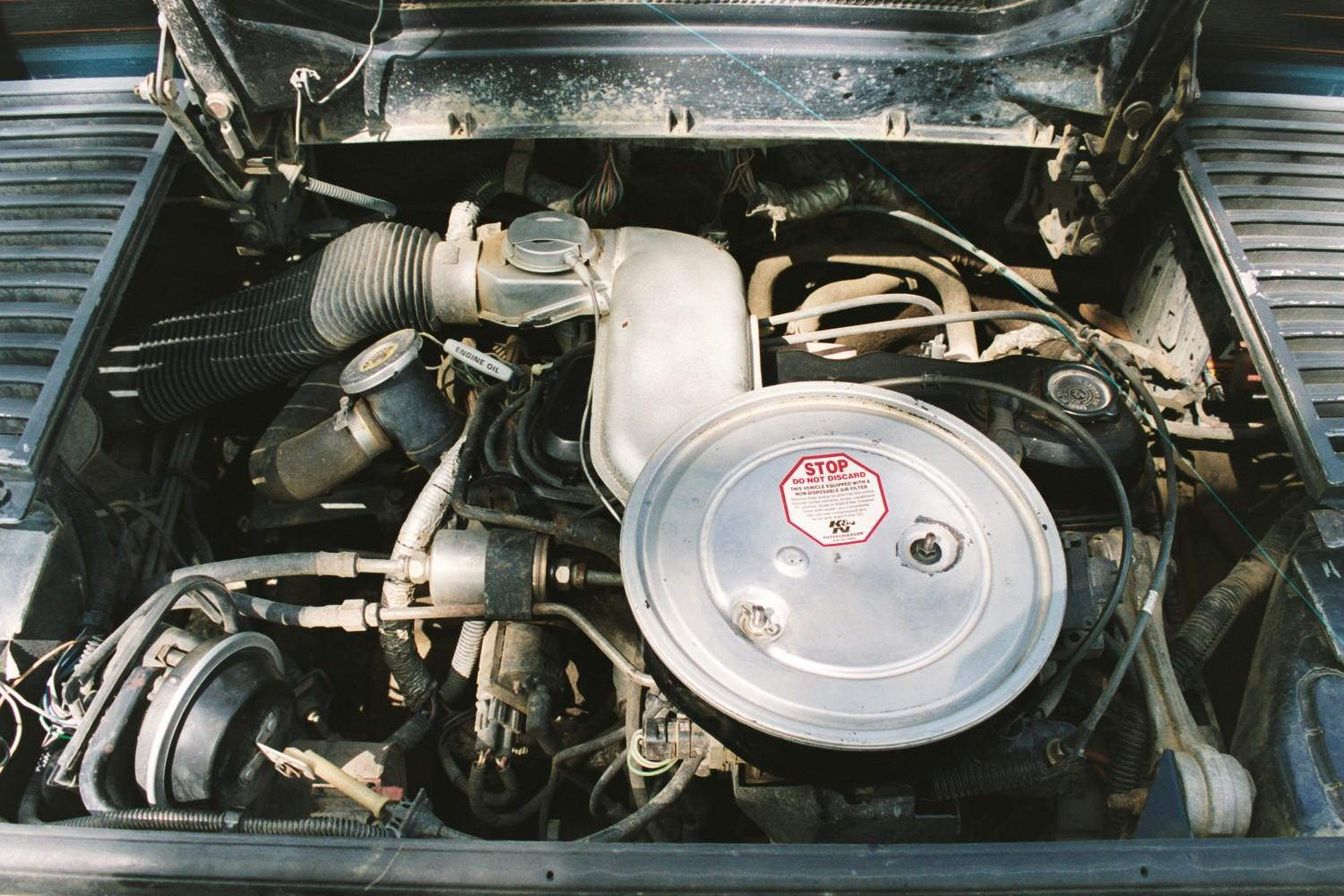
The Fiero's mid-mounted base 2.5 L 4-cylinder

All automatic-equipped Fieros were equipped with the three-speed Turbo-Hydramatic 125 with torque converter lockup (RPO MD9). Automatic transmission final drive ratios:

- I4
  - 1984–1986: 3.18 (RPO "F75")
  - 1987–1988: 2.84 (RPO "F17")
- V6
  - 1985–1986: 3.18 (RPO "F75")
  - 1986 SE: 3.06 (RPO "FW2")
  - 1986 GT, 1987–1988: 3.33 (RPO "GX3")
- THM-125 gear ratios
  - 1st gear: 2.84
  - 2nd gear: 1.60
  - 3rd gear: 1.00
  - Reverse: 2.07

==== Manual ====
All four-speed manual transmissions were built at the Muncie, Indiana, Allison plant. The 1984 production line saw two transmissions, a performance four-speed with a final drive ratio of 4.10, and an economy four-speed with a final drive ratio of 3.32. The V6 on the 1985 model and part of the 1986 production year came with a four-speed with a final drive ratio of 3.65. The lower-geared 4.10 four-speed transmission showed improved acceleration, but sacrificed fuel economy.

Isuzu and Muncie (Getrag) five-speed transmissions were available, depending on model and equipment beginning in 1985 for the Isuzu five-speed which came on four-cylinder cars and in 1986 for the Muncie five-speed which came on V6 equipped cars. The Getrag 282 five-speed is sometimes referred to as the Muncie 282 or the Muncie Getrag 282, as the design was licensed to General Motors for manufacture by Muncie (Getrag never built the 282). This Muncie transmission is the stronger unit, designed for use with the higher output of the V6.

Manual transmission gear ratios
| Year | Engine/Transmission | Code | Axle | 1st | 2nd | 3rd | 4th | 5th | Rev. |
|---|---|---|---|---|---|---|---|---|---|
| 1984 | I4/4-spd (economy) | MY8 | 3.32 | 3.69 | 1.95 | 1.24 | 0.73 | — | 3.42 |
| 1984 | I4/4-spd (performance) | M19 | 4.10 | 3.53 | 1.95 | 1.24 | 0.81 | — | 3.42 |
| 1985–88 | I4/5-spd | MT2 | 3.35 | 3.73 | 2.04 | 1.45 | 1.03 | 0.74 | 3.50 |
| 1985–86 | V6/4-spd | M17 | 3.65 | 3.31 | 1.95 | 1.24 | 0.81 | — | 3.42 |
| 1986–88 | V6/5-spd | MG2 | 3.61 | 3.50 | 2.05 | 1.38 | 0.94 | 0.72 | 3.41 |

=== Paint colors ===
| Color | Year(s) available | Code | Qty. built |
|---|---|---|---|
| White | 1984–1988 | 40 (WA-8554) | 61,437 |
| Black | 1984–1988 | 41 (WA-8555) | 82,208 |
| Red | 1984–1985 | 71 (WA-8553) | 90,125 |
| Light Gray Metallic | 1984–1985 | 14 (WA-8924) | 28,008 |
| Bright Red | 1986, 1988 | 81 (WA-8774) | 38,801 |
| Bright Silver Metallic | 1986–1988 | 16 (WA-9004) | 38,801 |
| Light Gold Metallic | 1986–1987 | 56 (WA-8962) | 20,444 |
| Medium Red Metallic | 1987–1988 | 77 (WA-9077) | 22,993 |
| Bright Blue Metallic | 1987 | 21 (WA-8963) | 4458 |
| Bright Yellow | 1988 | 53 (WA-8908) | 1166 |

=== Crash safety ===
The unique plastic body-on-spaceframe design, helped the Fiero to achieve a NHTSA NCAP frontal crash test rating of five stars, the highest rating available. According to Hemmings Motor News, the exceedingly sturdy, 600 lb (270 kg) space frame consisted of roughly 280 separate galvanized and high-strength steel stampings joined by 3,800 welds and, when assembled with the Fiero's mechanicals, was fully driveable without its skin. The Fiero's body panels are purely cosmetic (and aerodynamic) and carry no structural load. The Fiero was the second safest vehicle sold in America from 1984 to 1988, beaten only by the Volvo 740DL station wagon. The official crash test scores were as follows:

- Head Injury Criterion – 356.5/308.6
- Chest Deceleration (G) – 30.9/29.9
- Femur Load (LB) – Left 840/800 Right 800/740

The Fiero's technologically advanced spaceframe technology went on to be incorporated in the Saturn S-Series cars and the 1990-96 GM U platform minivans.

== Problems and issues ==
Safety issues escalated rapidly by the summer of 1987, when the fire count for 1984 models reached a rate of 20 fires per month. Fieros were catching fire at the rate of one for every 508 cars sold, surpassing all other mass-market automobile cars. Pontiac engineers knew about the problems early on: one wrote an urgent memo dated October 6, 1983, to report that two Fieros had suddenly caught fire during test drives. This was only 3 months after the production of the Fiero began. It was first thought to be caused by antifreeze leaking out of poorly installed hoses, when in reality it was defective connecting rods. After one meeting with the Saginaw foundry manager, he wrote that "60 percent to 90 percent of the rods produced do not exhibit defects." This means at least every 1 out of 10 rods produced were defective and possibly 4 out of 10 were also defective. The Associated Press quoted the National Highway Traffic Safety Administration as saying it had "received 148 complaints regarding Pontiac Fieros catching fire including reports of six injuries. Low levels of engine oil may cause a connecting rod to break, allowing oil to escape and come into contact with engine parts. The oil would catch fire when it contacted the exhaust manifold or hot exhaust components." David Hudgens, a GM spokesman in Detroit said "if you ran out of oil, and then that coupled with some aggressive driving, perhaps, and maybe not changing the oil very often, you end up with a broken rod, and that's where the connecting rod came in; it is still the owner's responsibility to check the oil." The Pontiac division said in a 1988 press release that "GM tests have shown that running these 1984 cars with low engine oil level can cause connecting rod failure which may lead to an engine compartment fire. Pontiac is aware of 260 fires attributable to the condition, along with ten reported minor injuries."

== In popular culture ==
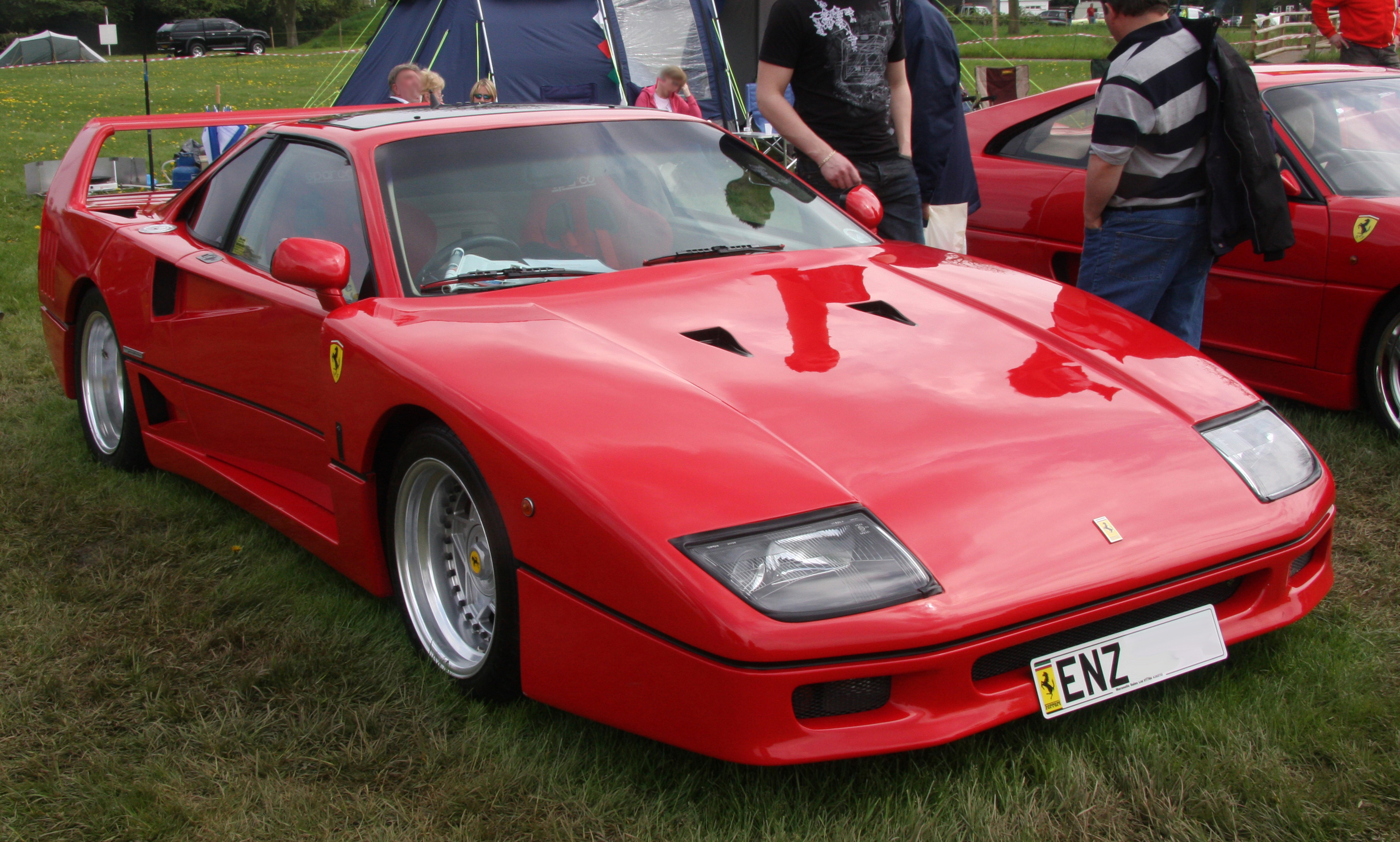
Replica of a Ferrari F40 based on a Fiero

The Fiero is a popular base car for replicas of supercars such as Ferraris and Lamborghinis, as well as for various other kit cars, due to being one of the least expensive mid-engine cars available on the market.

=== Legacy ===
When the Fiero's 1984 model was introduced, it played a major role in building the "excitement" image that the Pontiac Division Motor Company wanted to establish in its car buyers. This car pioneered new concepts such as the participation of autoworkers in production methods as well as new materials provide a showcase as the first production car in the world to use a space/frame chassis with a separate body shell composed of SMC Sheet Molded Composite. According to Design News, Pontiac engineers pointed out that the Fiero experience helped the company to develop the sporty look of the Grand Am and Sunbird, as well as "road car" features in the once-traditional Bonneville and Grand Prix. Such Fiero advances as the composite skin lived on in new GM products like the Saturn.

=== Scale models ===
Several diecast model manufacturers have replicated the Fiero in various scales. Hot Wheels released a 1984 Fiero 2M4 under many paint schemes. Matchbox and Majorette also released Fiero models during the car's heyday. Monogram has released, and re-released, a 1985 Fiero GT model (the re-release is currently available). In recent years, a large 1:18 die-cast model of a 1985 GT was available in red and silver colors. In 2007 the Motor Max toy company began making small die-cast Fiero GT toys under the "American Graffiti" and "Fresh Cherries" lines. Select Wal-Mart locations sold a special "Since '68" Fiero made by Hot Wheels, which uses the original 1984 mold with a new paint job. The Kenner toy line M.A.S.K. had a black Fiero GT that converted into a glider craft and three wheeled chopper, called "Fireforce." Tonka's toy line Gobots included a character, "Sparky", who converted into a 1984 Fiero 2M4 (called a "P-car" on the packaging). Also worth mention is the Transformers character Punch/Counterpunch, a spy who converts into a vehicle looking similar to a 1985 Fiero GT, but modified to avoid trademark issues. Other plastic-kit display models were released by MPC-ERTL in 1:25 scale. One was a 1984 2M4 kit 10883, the other was 1987 (essentially identical to 1986) GT kit 6401.
