= Renault Master =

French built series of largevans

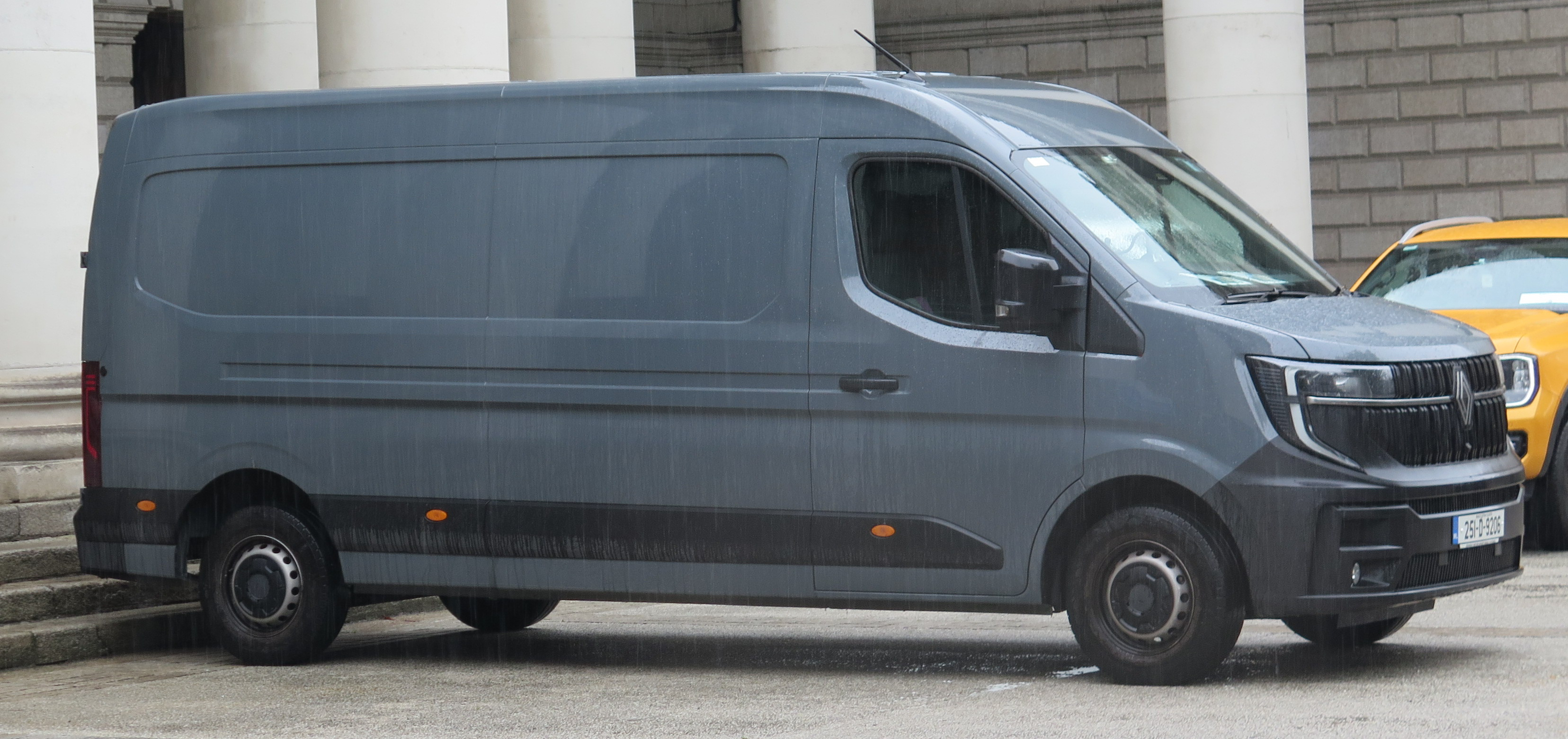

Overview
- Manufacturer: Renault
- Production: 1980–present

Body and chassis
- Class: Light commercial vehicle (M); Large van

Chronology
- Predecessor: Saviem SG3; Renault 50 series (B series/Messenger); Nissan Trade
- Successor: Fiat-based Opel/Vauxhall Movano (for Opel and Vauxhall models); Renault Maxity (Mascott)

The Renault Master is a large van produced by the French manufacturer Renault since 1980, now in its fourth generation. It replaced the earlier Renault Super Goélette light trucks. It is also sold as the Nissan Interstar. Opel and Vauxhall have sold versions of the second and third series vans as the Opel Movano in Continental Europe and Vauxhall Movano in the United Kingdom. All four generations have been designed and manufactured by Renault, irrespective of the brand. Renault Trucks markets it as the Renault Trucks Master.

Over its lifetime, several different body styles have been available, from the standard van to bigger models with an increased load area, height, and longer wheelbases with an LWB prefix. Panel vans and crew vans are very common, but pickups are also available. Heavier duty models of the Master were also sold by (now Volvo owned) Renault Trucks as the B series, later as the Messenger and the Mascott.

== First generation (1980–1997) ==
First generation
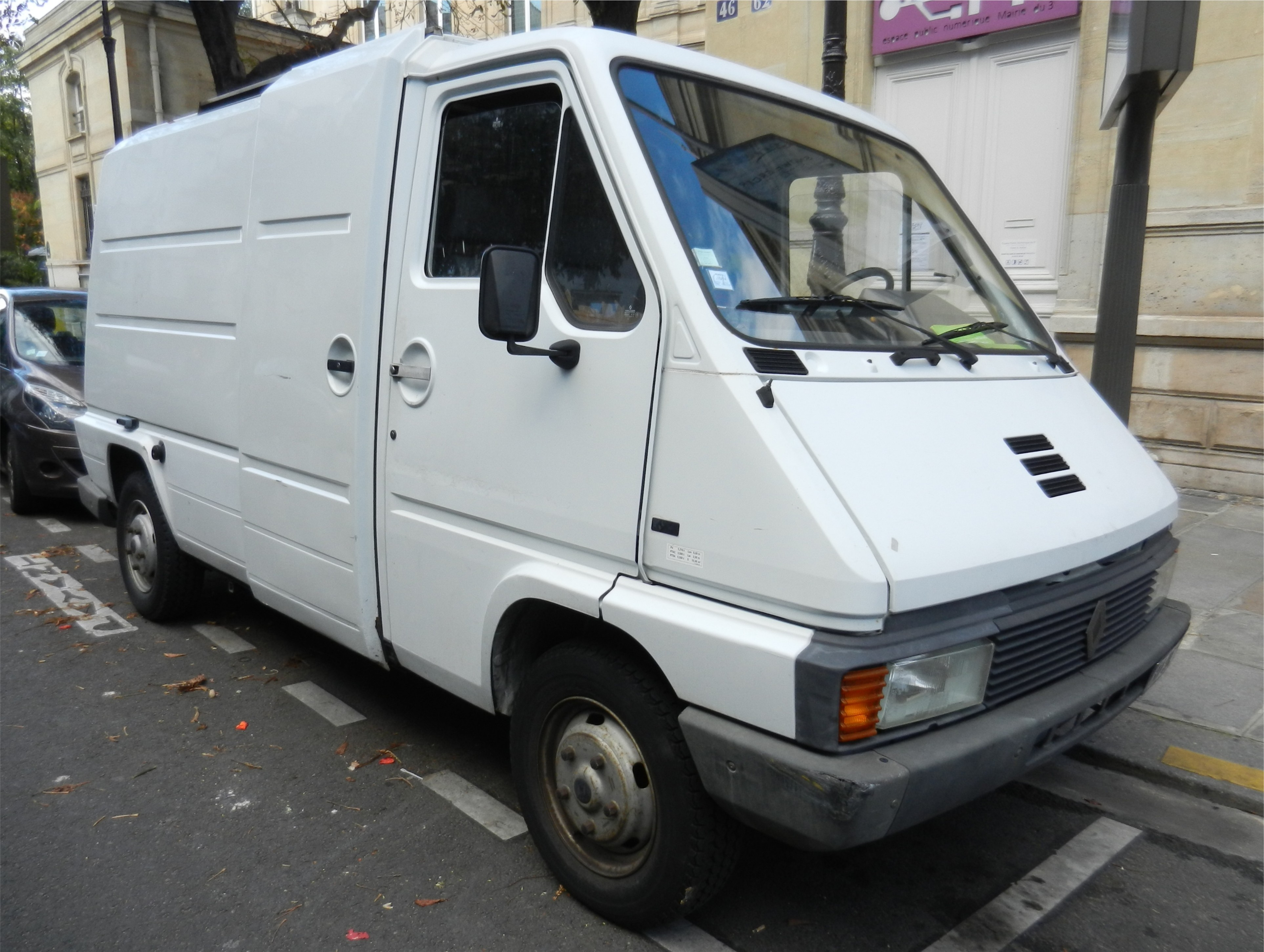

Overview
- Also called: Renault B-series; Renault Messenger
- Production: 1980–1997 (Master); 1991–1999 (Messenger)
- Assembly: France: Batilly

Body and chassis
- Layout: Mid-engine, front-wheel drive
- Related: Renault Trafic; Winnebago LeSharo

Powertrain
- Engine: 2.0 L J5R I4 (petrol); 2.2 L J7T I4 (petrol); 2.1 L J8S I4 (diesel); 2.5 L S8U I4 (diesel); 2.5 L S9U I4 (diesel) (1990–1998)
- Transmission: 5-speed manual

Chronology
- Predecessor: Renault 50 series Saviem SG3

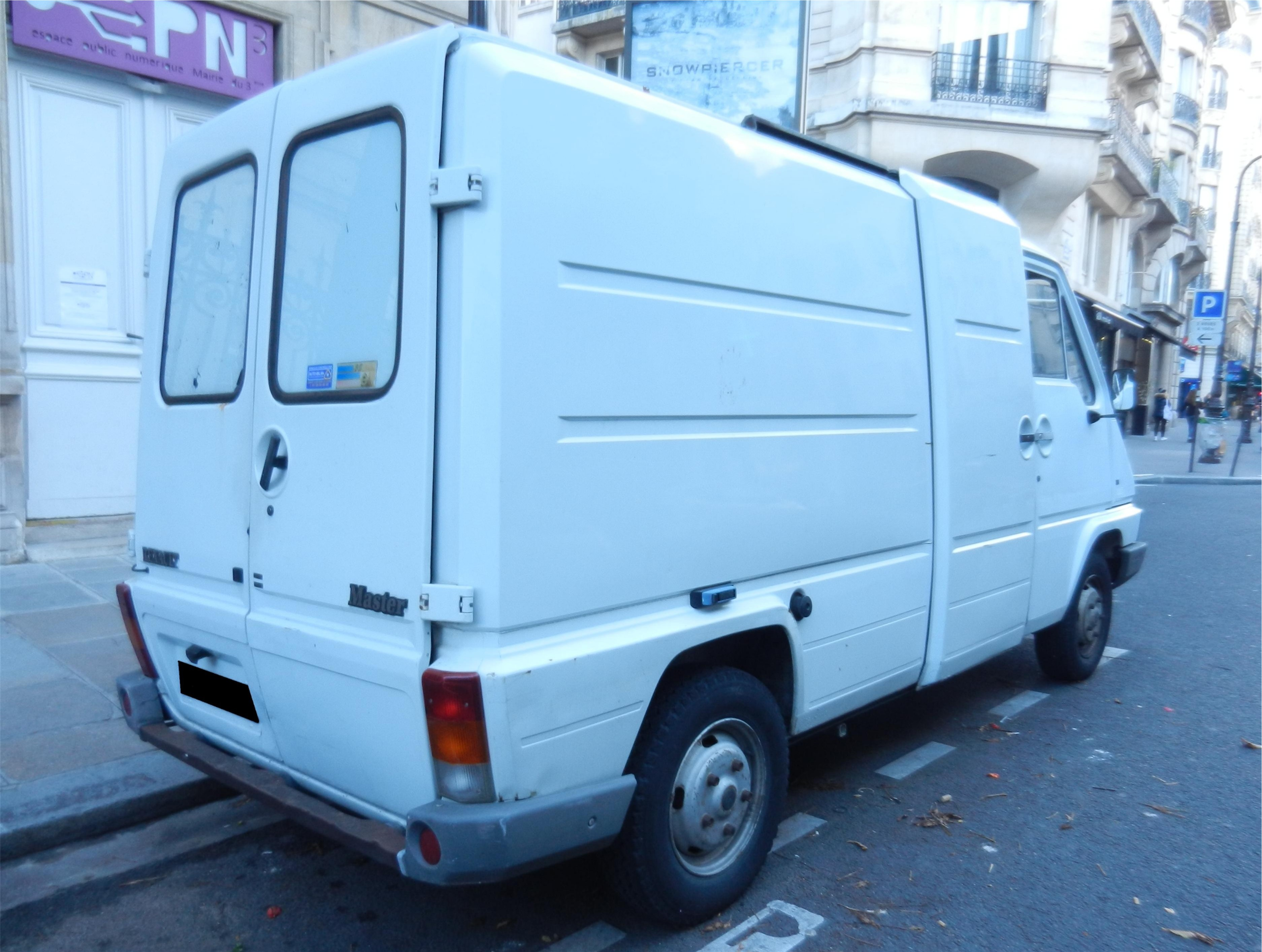
Renault Master (rear)

The original Renault Master was launched in September 1980. Originally launched with the 2.4 L (2,445 cc) Fiat-Sofim diesel engine, and from 1984 also with the 2.1 L (2,068 cc) power unit. In rare cases the Master was sold with a 2.0 L or 2.2 L Renault petrol engine.

In 1990, a marginally larger (2499 cc) version of the Sofim diesel replaced the earlier version.

They competed with a number of other manufacturer's products, and completed Renault's commercial range, after the Dodge 50 Series, which was latterly being built as the Renault 50 Series, after Renault's acquisition of the Dodge production facilities in the United Kingdom (at the time of Peugeot's takeover of Chrysler Europe).

The smaller Renault Trafic was also launched in 1980, resulting in a large range of light commercial vehicles.

The Master was distinctively styled with the sliding door design and unusual round door handles, similar to those of the Fiat Ritmo/Strada. The van was manufactured at Renault's then new SoVAB Batilly plant in northeastern France.

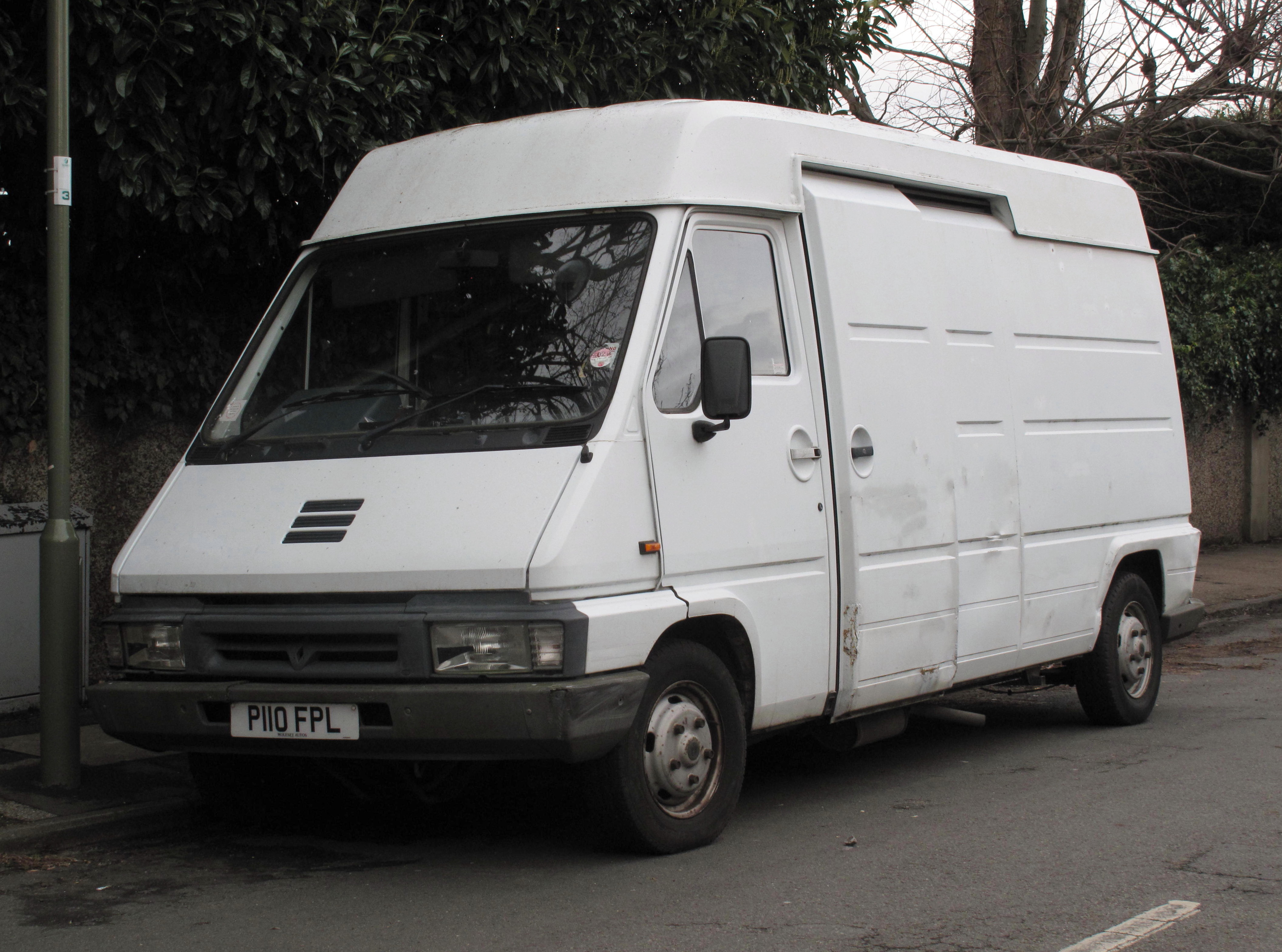
Renault Master facelift

=== Renault B series / Messenger ===
An alternative heavier duty version which appeared almost identical, was sold by Renault Trucks as the Renault B70 to B120. It first appeared as the 70 PS (51 kW) B70 (diesel) and as the 80 PS (59 kW) B80 (petrol) in the end of 1982. It was a light truck with a Renault Master I body on a separate chassis, with rear wheel drive and rear dual wheels.

The B series was offered with a range of alternative body options. As the Master (and the smaller Trafic) both carried manufacturer's plates from Renault's automobile division, RVI's production numbers appeared to plummet as the SG2 and SG3 were gradually replaced. It was introduced in the United Kingdom in 1990, gradually replacing the previous Chrysler Europe-developed Dodge/Renault 50 series.

It was thus decided in 1982 to transfer the new, heavier B series range to RVI. More powerful versions were gradually added, incorporating turbochargers and intercooling.

Although a 4x4 version of the B90 took part in the Paris Dakar Rally in 1987, the "civilian" version of the B90 4x4 truck was unveiled in 1990 only, and was sold until 1999. In 1993, the B series had a grille change and was renamed Messenger.

It was replaced by the Renault Mascott.

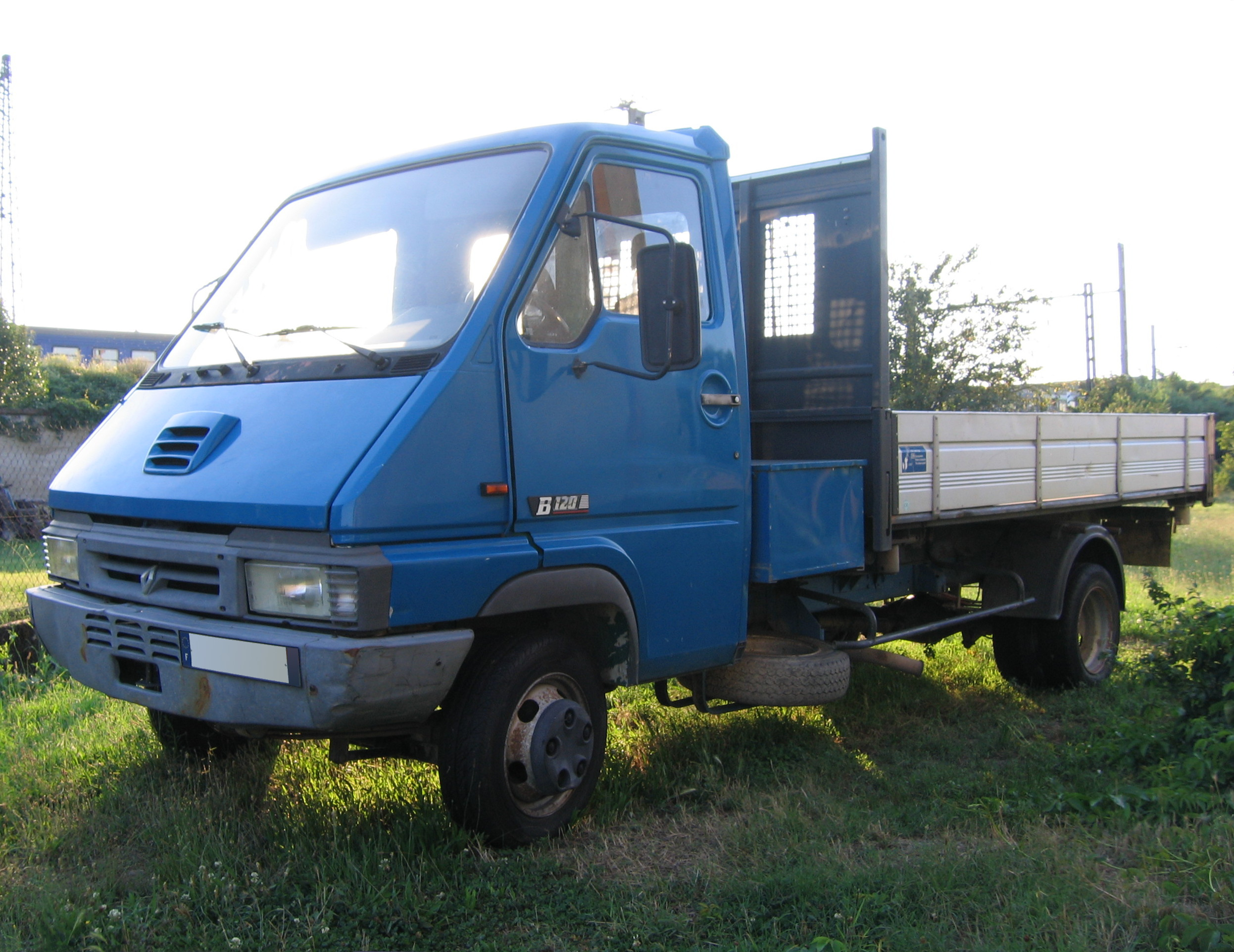
1992–1999 Renault Messenger B120 flatbed

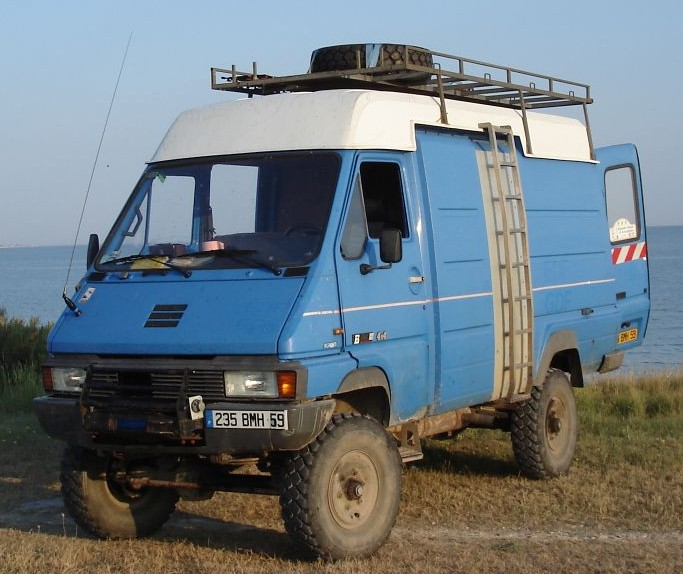
Renault Messenger B90 4x4

== Second generation (1997–2010) ==
Second generation
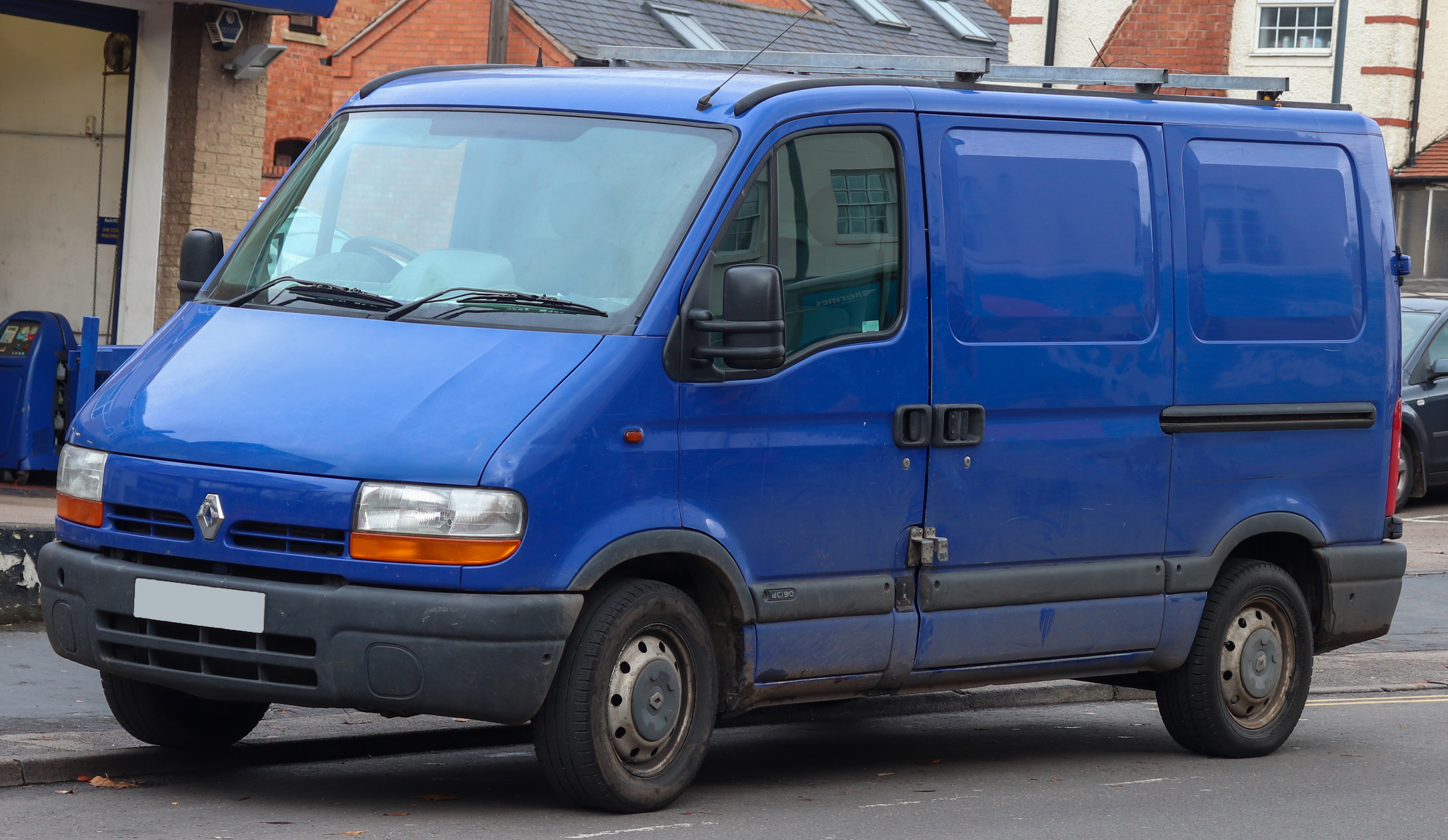

Overview
- Also called: Opel Movano; Vauxhall Movano; Nissan Interstar
- Production: 1997–2010
- Assembly: France: Batilly (SoVAB); Brazil: São José dos Pinhais (Renault Brazil)

Body and chassis
- Layout: Transverse front-engine, front-wheel drive; Longitudinal front-engine, rear-wheel drive

Powertrain
- Engine: 1.9 L Renault F-Type I4 (diesel); 2.2 L Renault G-Type I4 (diesel); 2.5 L Renault G-Type I4 (diesel); 2.5 L Nissan YD I4 (diesel); 2.5 L Sofim 8140 I4 (diesel); 2.8 L Sofim 8140 I4 (diesel); 3.0 L Nissan ZD I4 (diesel)
- Transmission: 5-speed manual; 6-speed manual; 6-speed semi-automatic

Chronology
- Predecessor: Nissan Trade

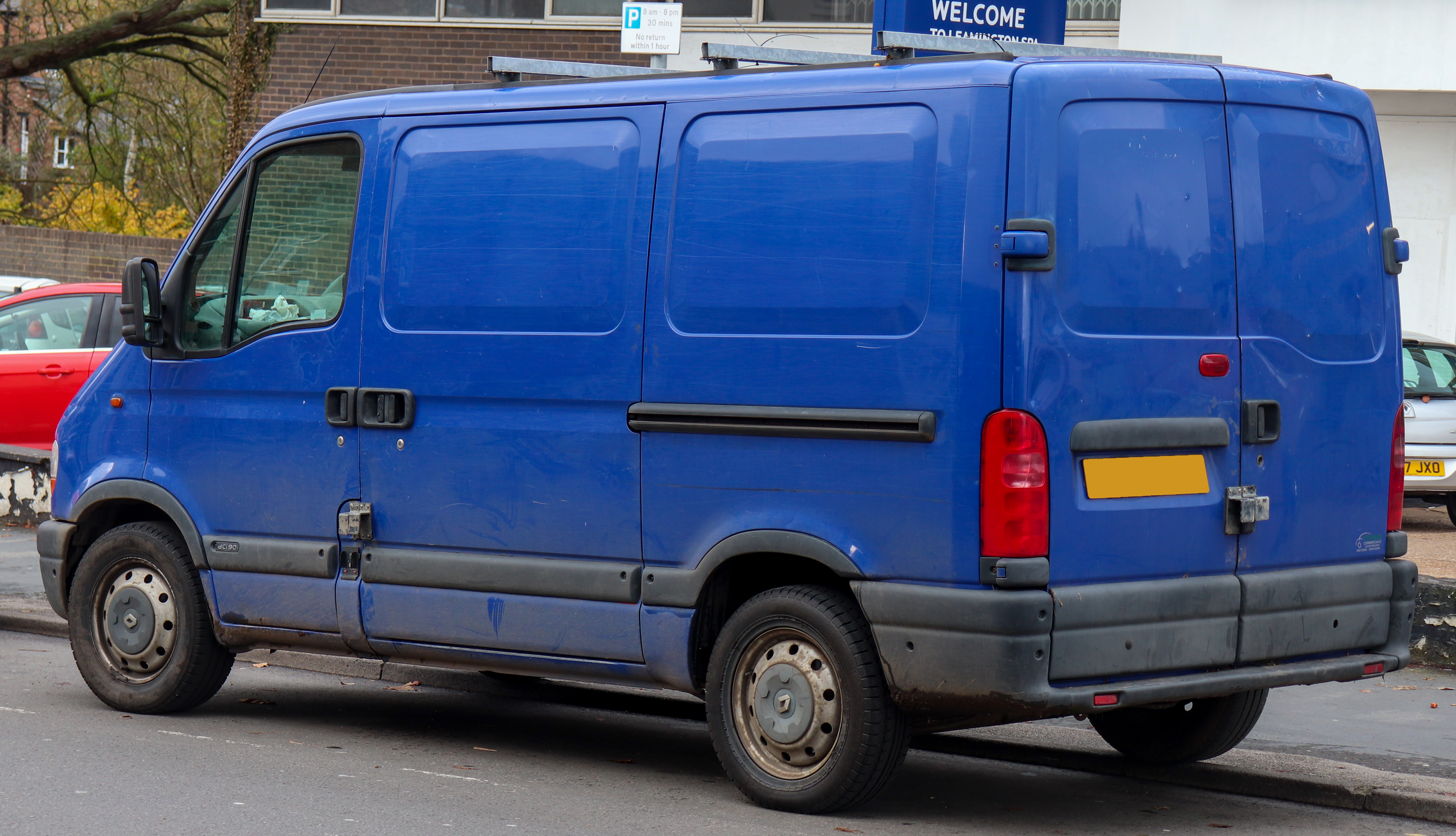
Renault Master rear (1997–2005)

The second generation Renault Master, which arrived in November 1997, was more conventional in appearance and, though primarily developed by Renault, was available from 1998 as the almost identical Opel Movano (badged in the United Kingdom as the Vauxhall Movano), and from Renault's closely related partner Nissan, from whom it was available as the Nissan Interstar from 2003.

This arrangement mirrors the collaboration between these companies on the Master's smaller counterpart, the Renault Trafic; within the industry, similar platform sharing arrangements existed between Fiat and Peugeot/Citroën, and also between Volkswagen and Mercedes.

The second generation of the Renault Master and the second generation of the Iveco Daily share many panels and some components of the cab, including the doors due to an agreement between Iveco and Renault stipulated in July 1994.

The agreement provided for the production and sharing of common components for a total of 120 thousand pieces a year produced in the various factories of Brescia (Italy, Iveco), Suzzara (Italy, Iveco), Valladolid (Spain, Iveco) and Batilly (France, Renault factory).

The Master used the Renault S-Type engine in S9U and S8W/S9W versions, the G-Type engine (G9T) and the Nissan YD engine. Displacements available (not across all chassis/body sizes) included 2.2, 2.5, and 2.8 litres with a range of power outputs. In certain markets it was also available with the Renault F-Type engine in the F9Q versions, the 1.9 liters engine, both dti and dci with power range between 80 respectively 82 hp.

The van received a mid life major facelift in the end of 2003, with the headlight area being heavily restyled (together with cosmetic changes to rear lights, wing mirrors, and dashboard), resulting in the front end somewhat resembling the smaller Trafic. Like its predecessor, the van was available in a number of sizes and configurations, and was a popular base for conversion to ambulance bodywork.

For the facelifted Master, the 2.8-litre engine option was replaced in some markets with the 3.0-litre ZD3 engine derived from the Nissan ZD30 engine, variants ZD3 200 or 202 for transverse mount front wheel drive arrangements and variants; 600, 604, 606 or 608 for rear wheel drive arrangements. The grille was redesigned in 2007 on Renault-badged models.

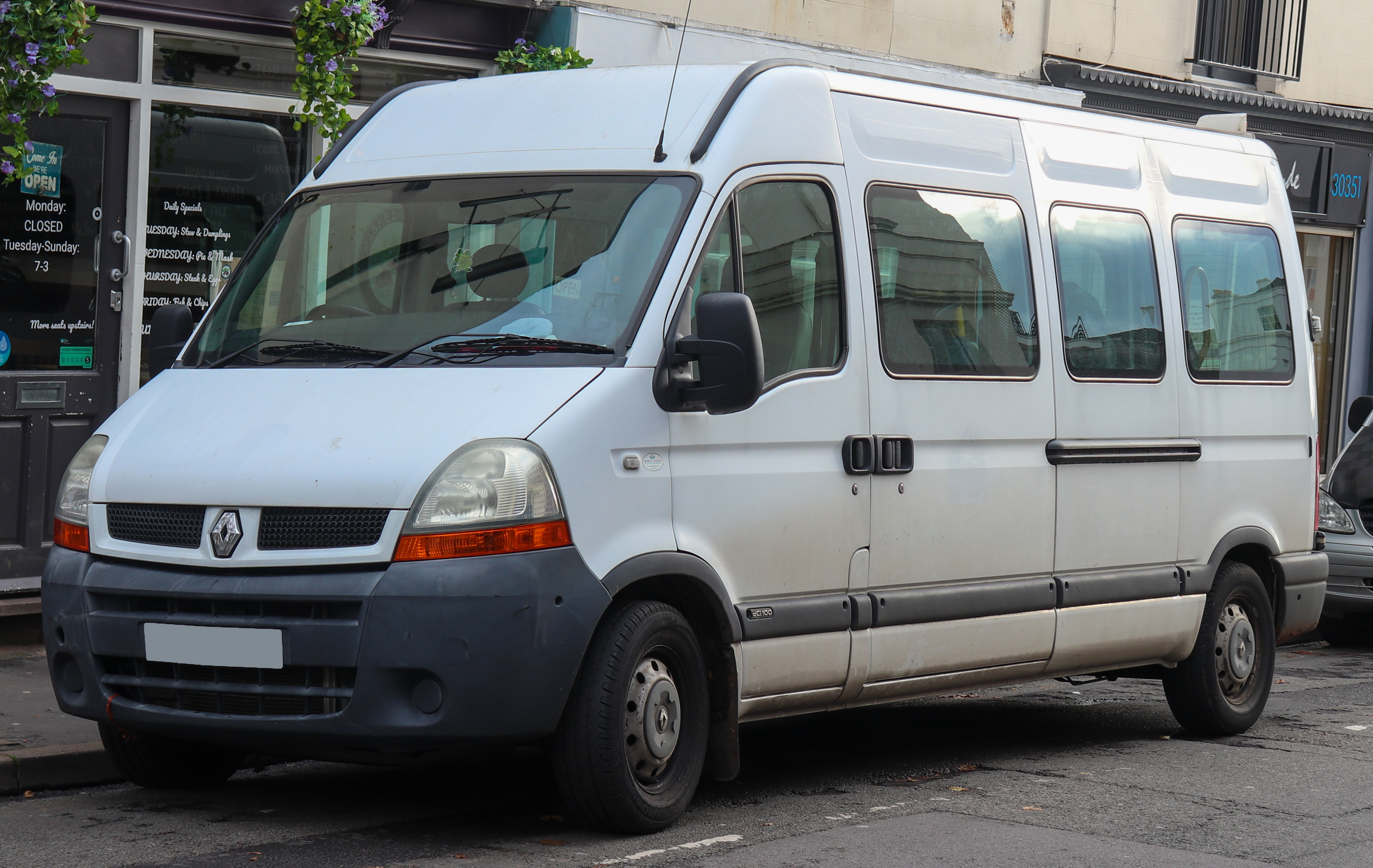
Facelifted Renault Master (2003–2010)

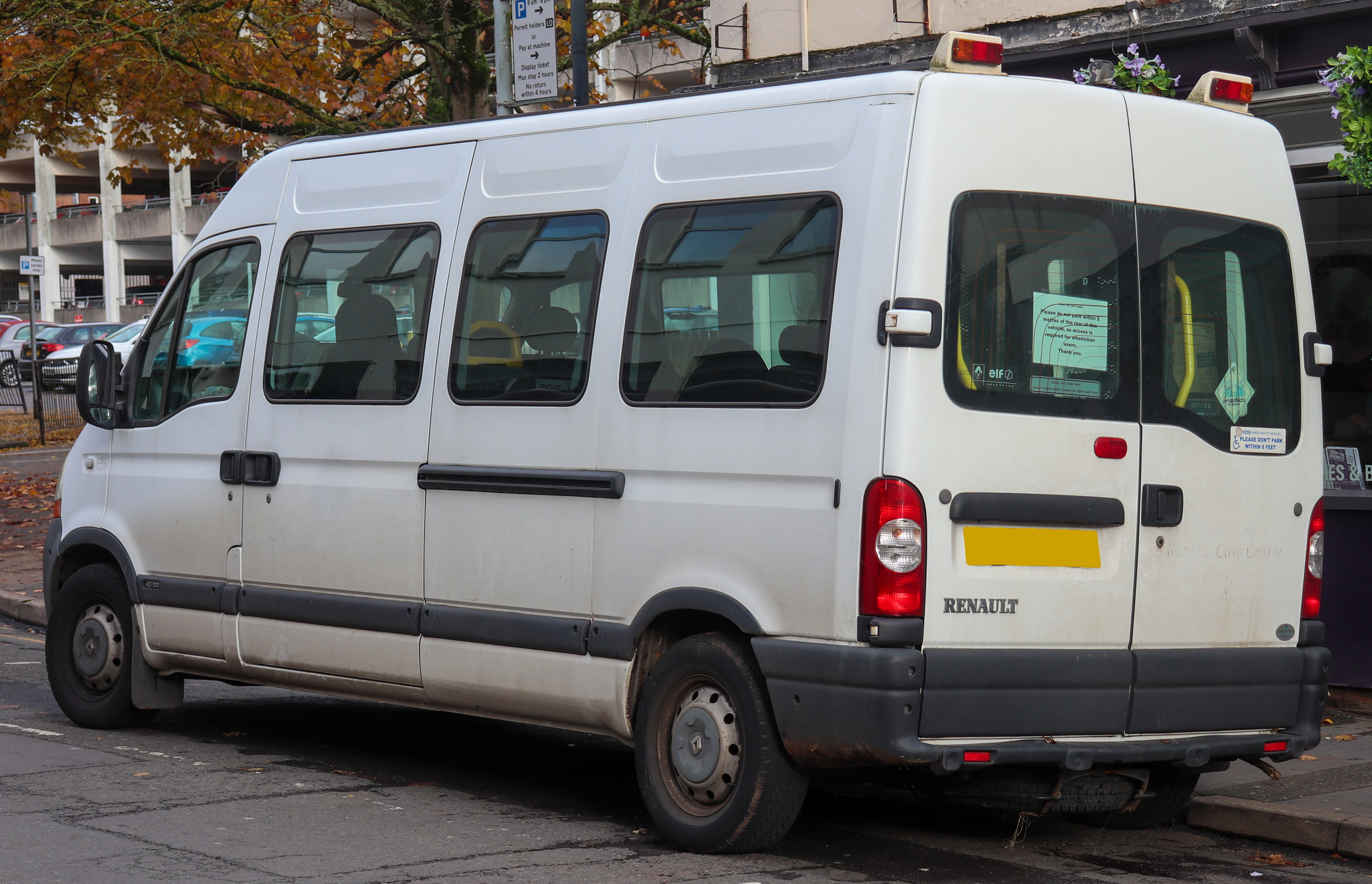
Facelifted Renault Master rear (2003–2010)

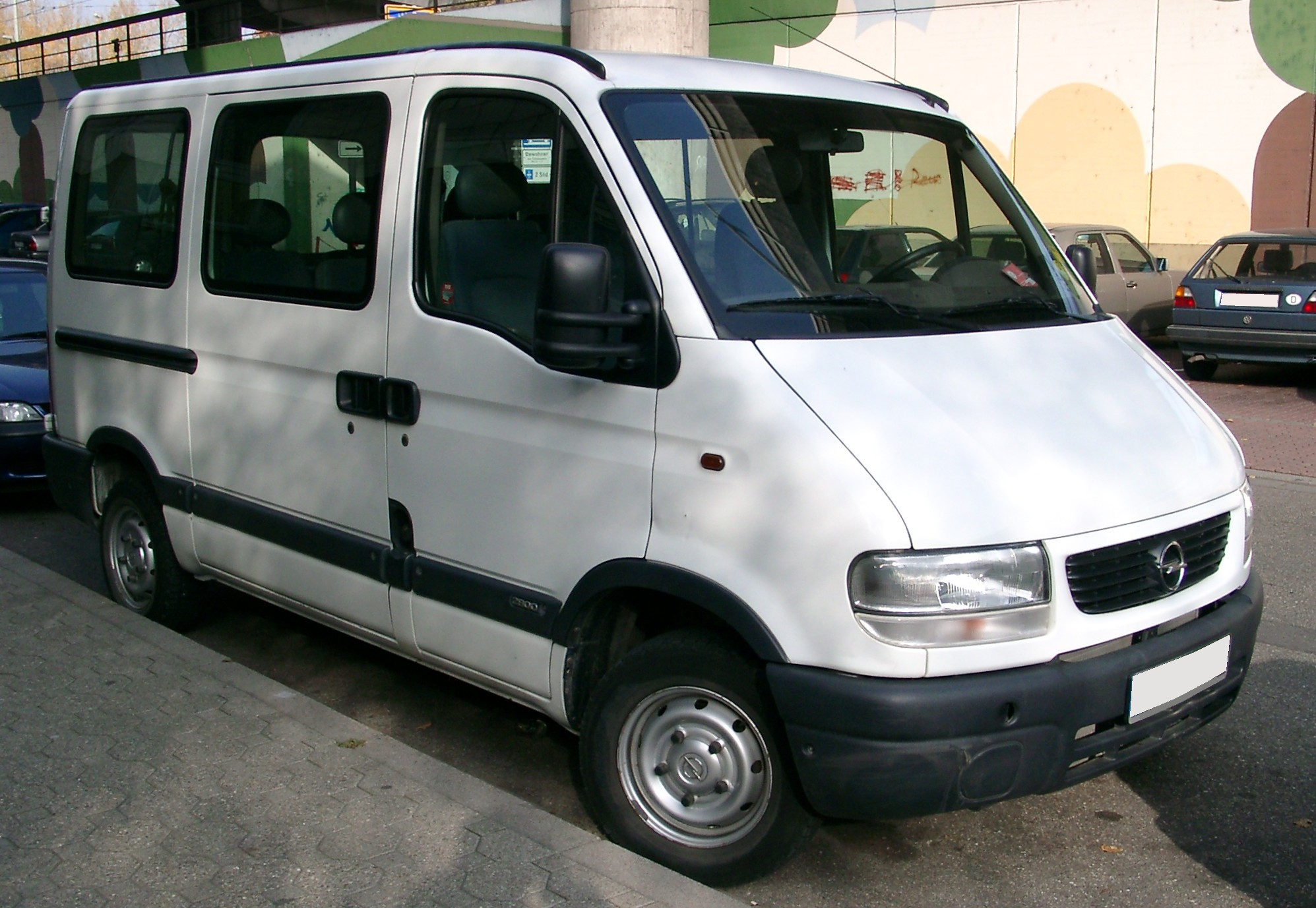
Opel Movano A (1998–2003), low roof, short wheelbase minibus

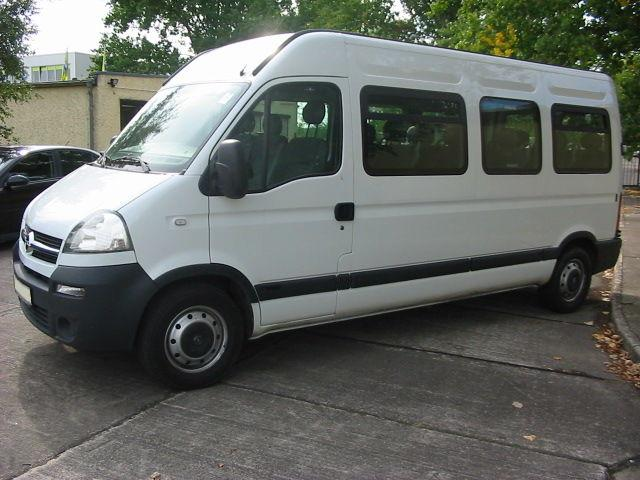
Opel Movano A (2003–2010), medium roof, long wheelbase minibus

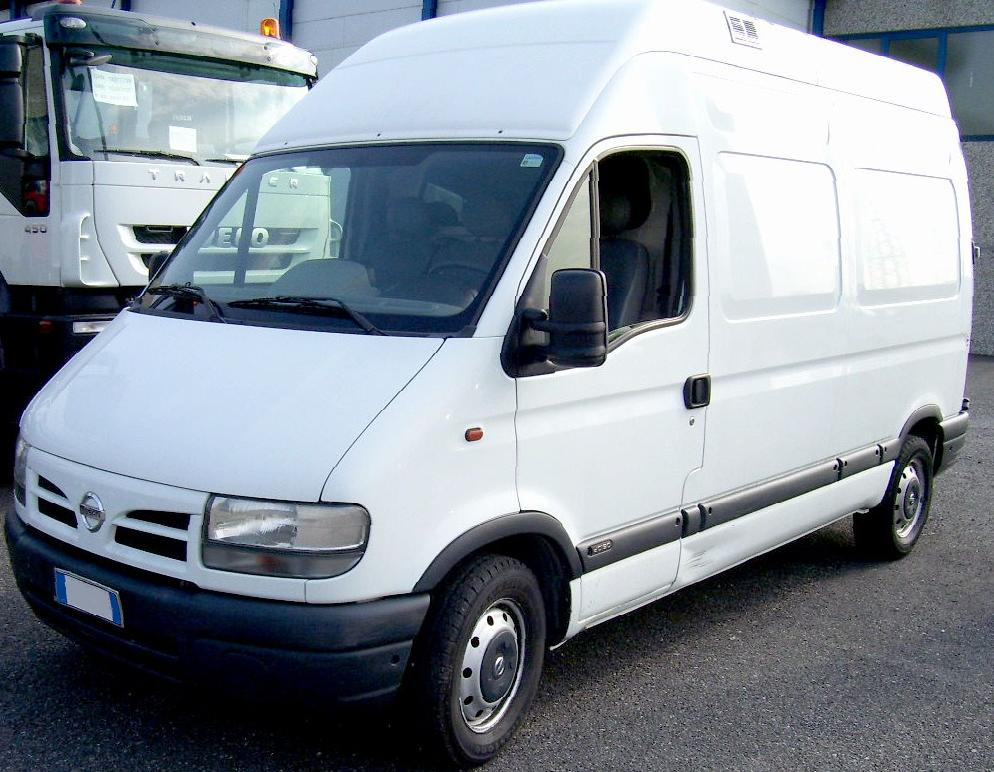
Nissan Interstar (2001–2003), high roof, medium wheelbase van

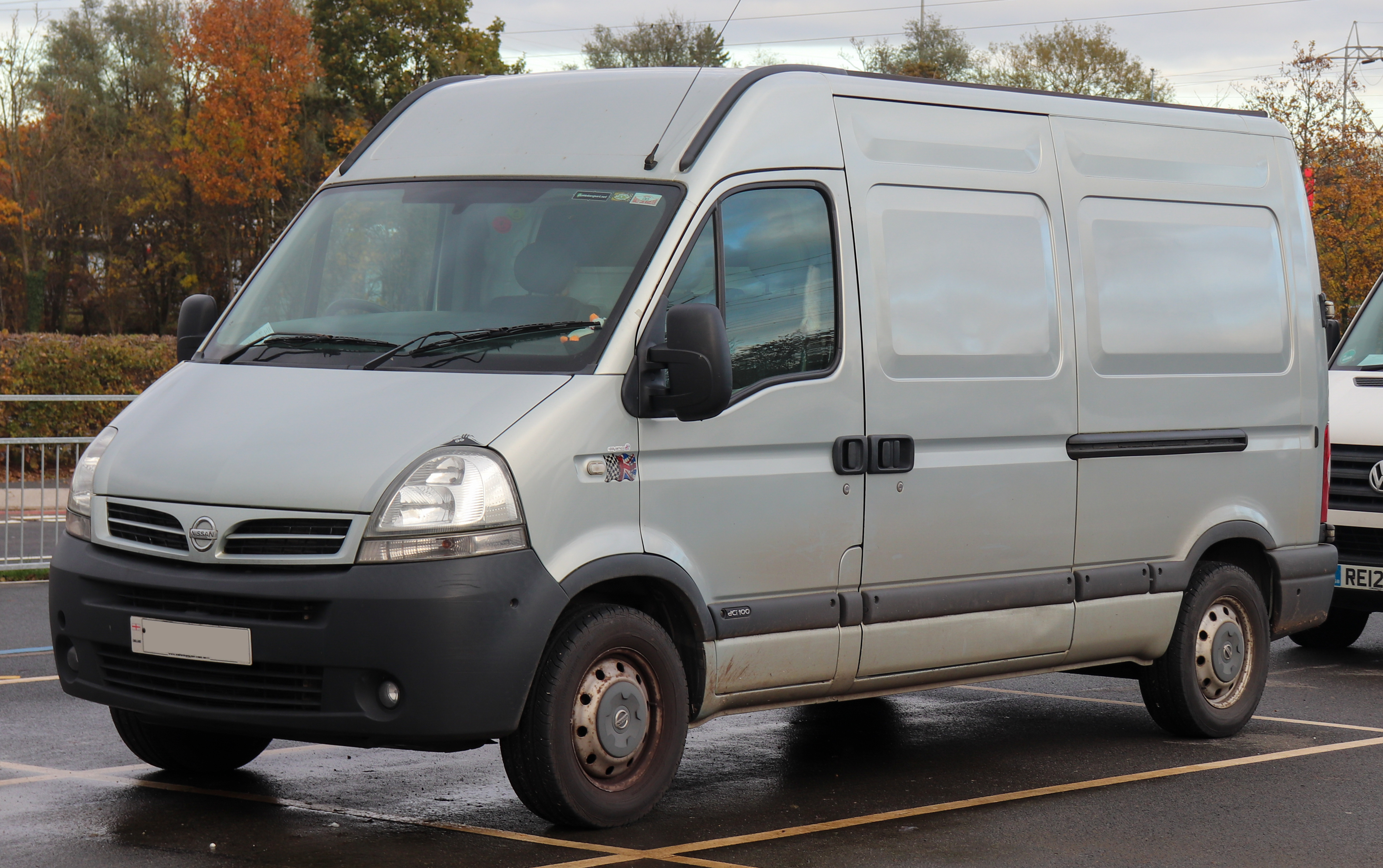
Nissan Interstar (2003–2010), medium roof, medium wheelbase van

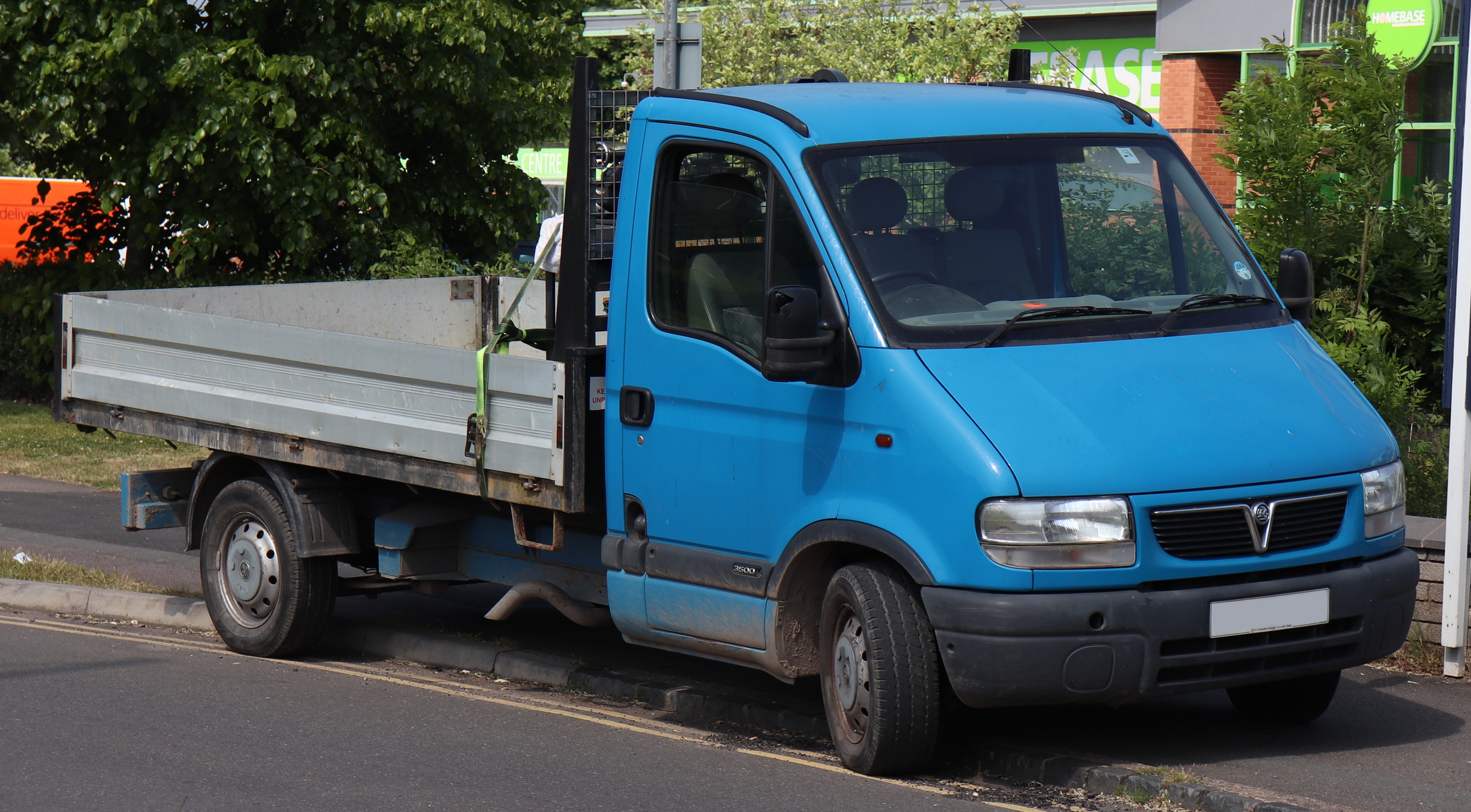
Vauxhall Movano A

=== Renault Mascott ===
Renault Mascott
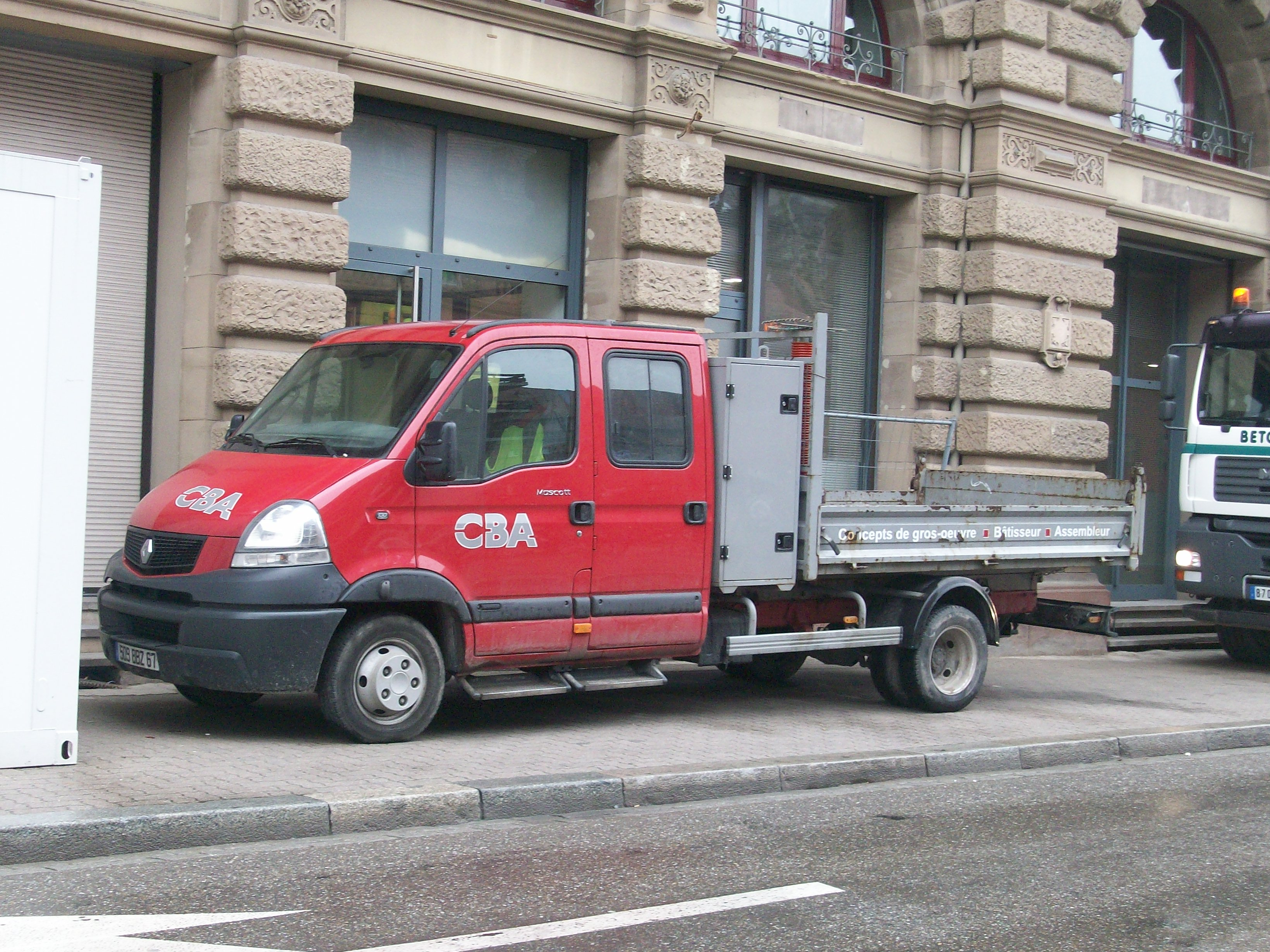

Overview
- Also called: Renault Master LDT/Maxi/Pro/Propulsion
- Production: 1999–2013

Body and chassis
- Layout: Longitudinal front-engine, rear-wheel drive

Powertrain
- Engine: 2.8 L Sofim 8140 I4 (diesel); 3.0 L Nissan ZD I4 (diesel)
- Transmission: 5-speed manual; 6-speed manual

Chronology
- Predecessor: Renault B-series
- Successor: Renault Maxity

Renault Trucks marketed a heavy duty 3.0 L diesel version of the Master with rear-wheel drive and sold it as the Mascott. Other names for this version are: Master Propulsion (France and others), and Master Pro (The Netherlands).

It retained the name Master in Albania, Bosnia and Herzegovina, Croatia, Macedonia, and Slovenia, Master LDT in Belgium, Master Maxi in Poland, and Master Propulsion in Spain, France, Italy, and Réunion. Available in Europe between 1999 and 2013, it was positioned between the Master and the larger Renault Midlum.

It was available in two states of tune, either 120 PS (88 kW; 118 hp) or 160 PS (118 kW; 158 hp) with five and six speeds respectively.

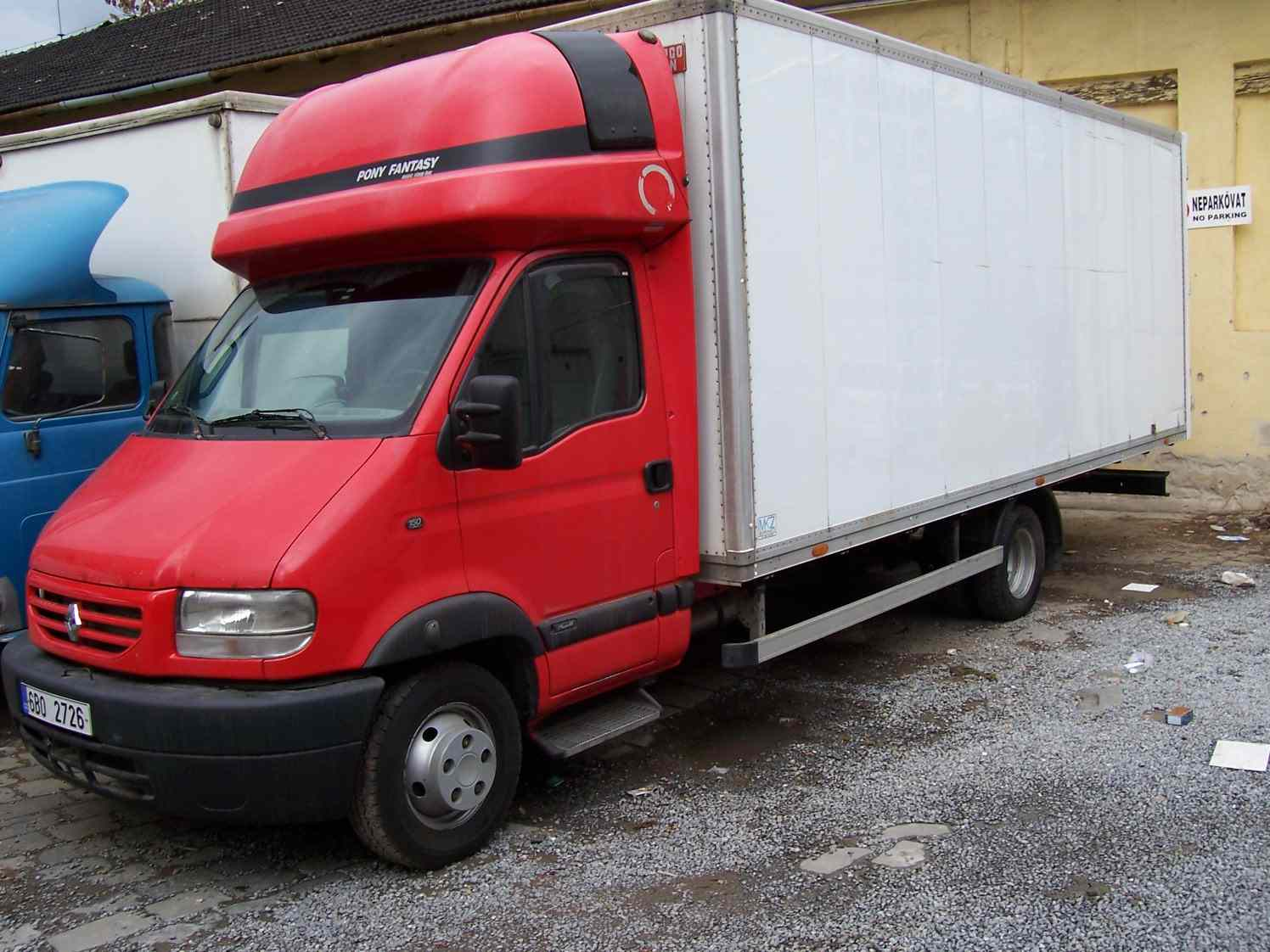
Pre-facelift Renault Mascott box truck

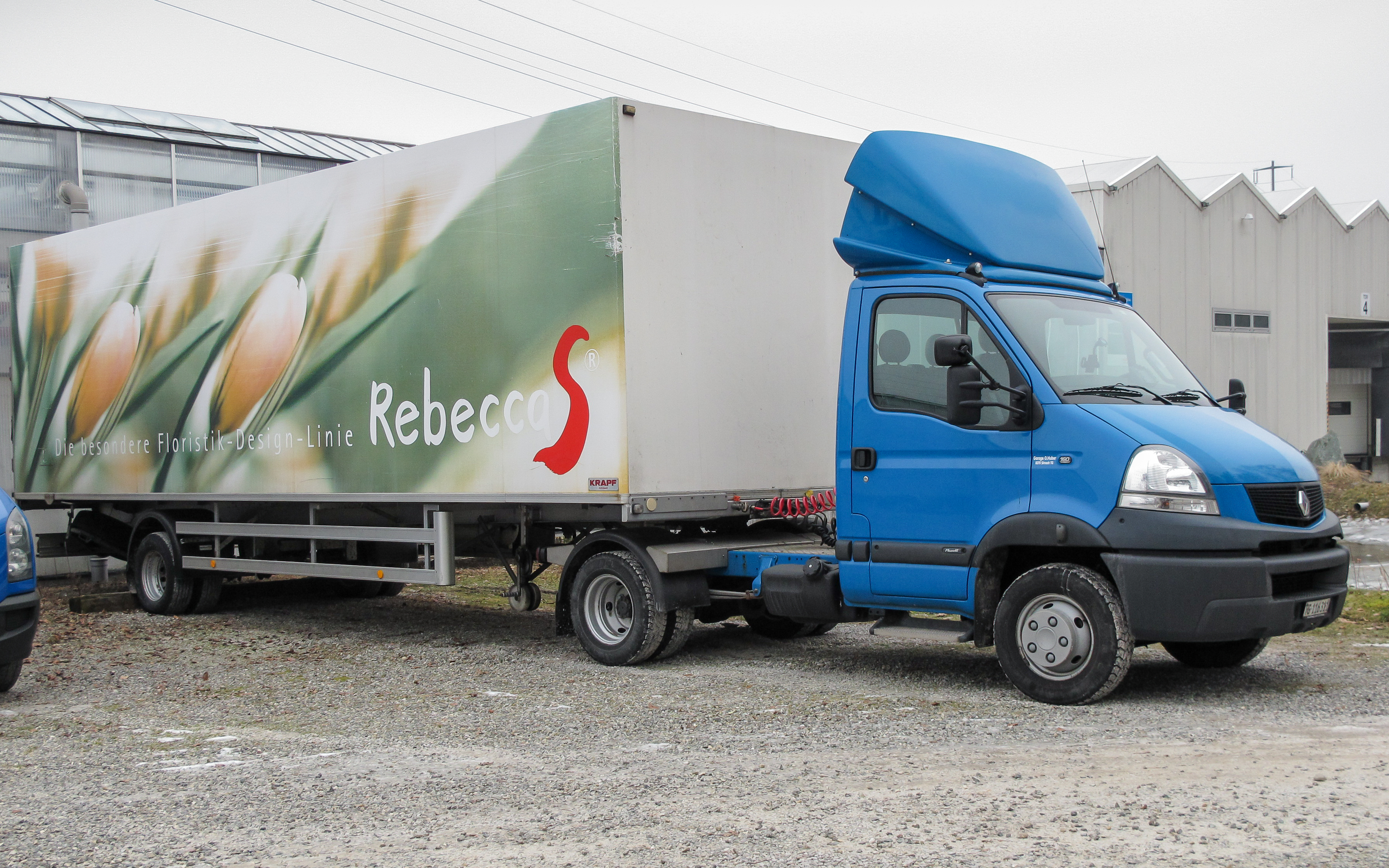
Post-facelift Mascott with Semi trailer

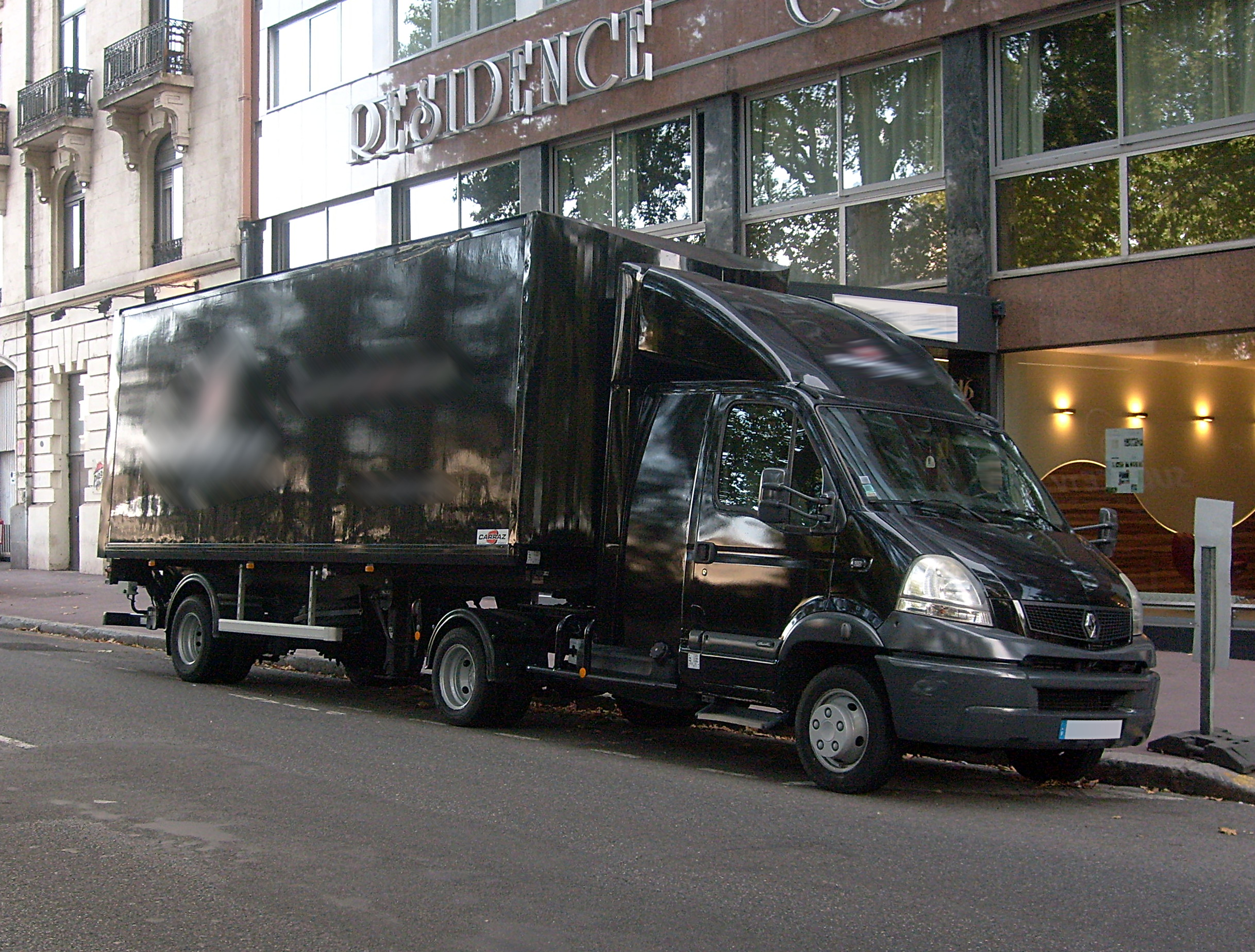
Post-facelift Mascott with Semi trailer

== Third generation (2010–2024) ==
Third generation
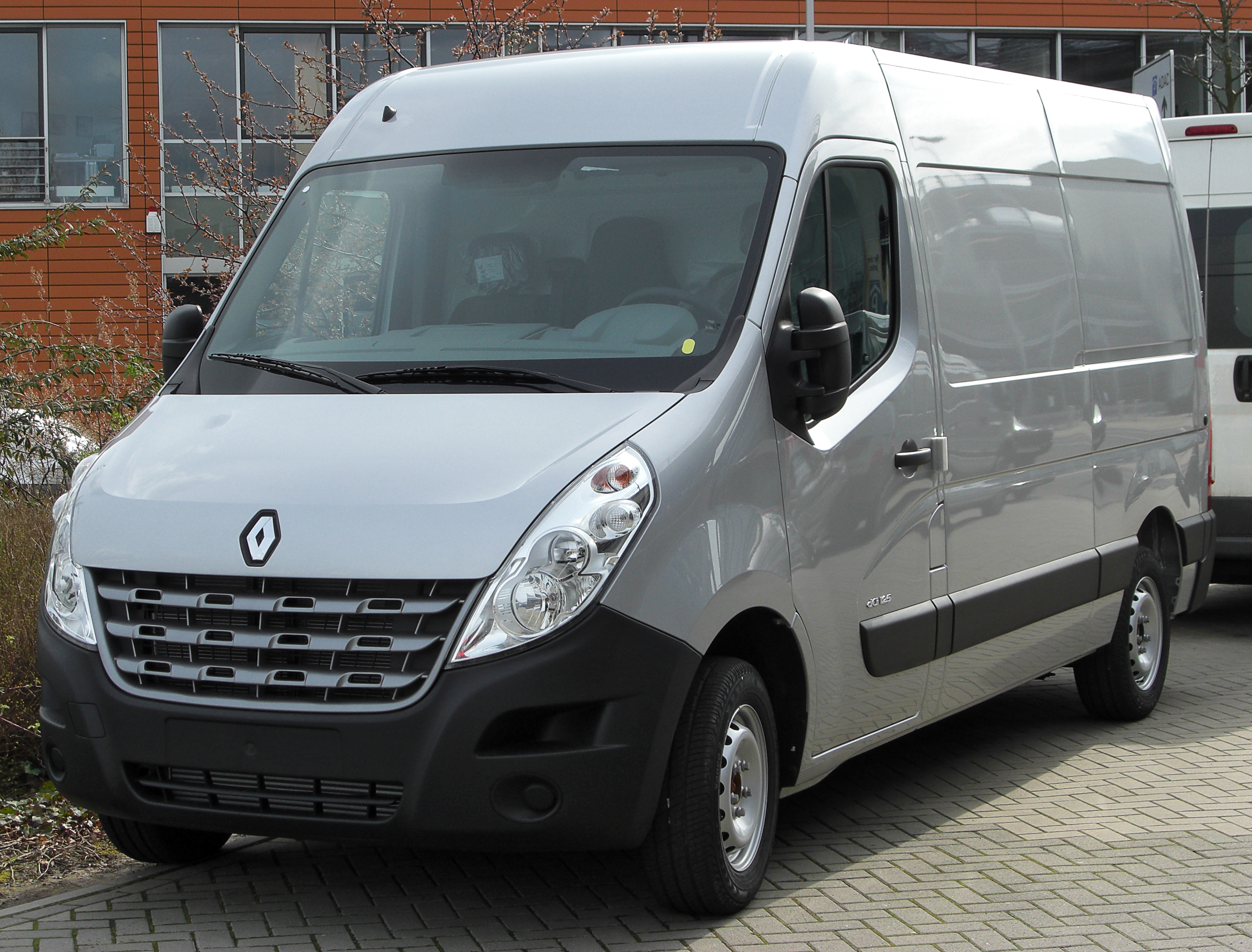

Overview
- Also called: Renault Trucks Master; Nissan NV400 (2012–2022); Nissan Interstar (2022–2024); Opel Movano (2010–2021); Vauxhall Movano (2010–2021)
- Production: 2010–2024; 2018–2024 (South Korea)
- Assembly: France: Batilly (SoVAB); Brazil: São José dos Pinhais (Renault Brazil)

Body and chassis
- Layout: Transverse front-engine, front-wheel drive; Longitudinal front-engine, rear-wheel drive; Transverse front-engine, all-wheel drive

Powertrain
- Engine: 2.3 L M9T I4-T (diesel)
- Transmission: 6-speed manual; 6-speed automated manual

A new generation of the Renault Master was introduced in the summer of 2010, again including the rebadged Opel/Vauxhall Movano and Nissan NV400. It is the first time that either the Opel/Vauxhall or Nissan has been available with single/twin rear wheel drive.

The M-type 2.3-litre four cylinder diesel engine is shared by all four marques, and is available in three states of tune, from 100 PS (74 kW; 99 bhp) to 150 PS (110 kW; 148 bhp). Renault Trucks discontinued the Mascott and sold the third generation Master in chassis cab format only, with payloads of up to 2.5 tonnes.

In the United Kingdom, the Movano is available in a large range of height, length and weight configurations, and capable of transporting up to 4,500 kg (9,900 lb). In April 2014, the front grille was facelifted on the Renault Master and Renault Trucks Master Red but the facelift did not apply to the Opel/Vauxhall and Nissan versions. On 18 April 2016, Renault announced starting producing an off-road version of the Renault Master, with a four-wheel drive layout.

In South Korea, FF Layout Master L1H1(S) and L2H2(L) panel van were launched on 15 October 2018. They are imported from France. The first Master in South Korean market will be diesel with manual gearbox. Short version trim(S)'s price are 29,000,000won, Long body van(L)'s price are 31,000,000won. Renault Korea possibly consider the competitors as the Hyundai Starex and Hyundai H350.

In September 2019, a facelifted model was introduced for the 2020 model year.

In Summer 2021, the Opel/Vauxhall Movano was discontinued due to the partnership of Opel/Vauxhall with Groupe PSA, now known as Stellantis, and replaced with a new Movano, based on the Fiat Ducato.

In 2022, the Nissan version reverted to using the Interstar name.

In Spring 2022, the short models were discontinued for Renault's Master III, Renault Trucks' Master III Red and Nissan's Interstar II.

In Summer 2022, the closed-transport low-roof variants were discontinued for Renault's Master III, Renault Trucks' Master III Red and Nissan's Interstar II.

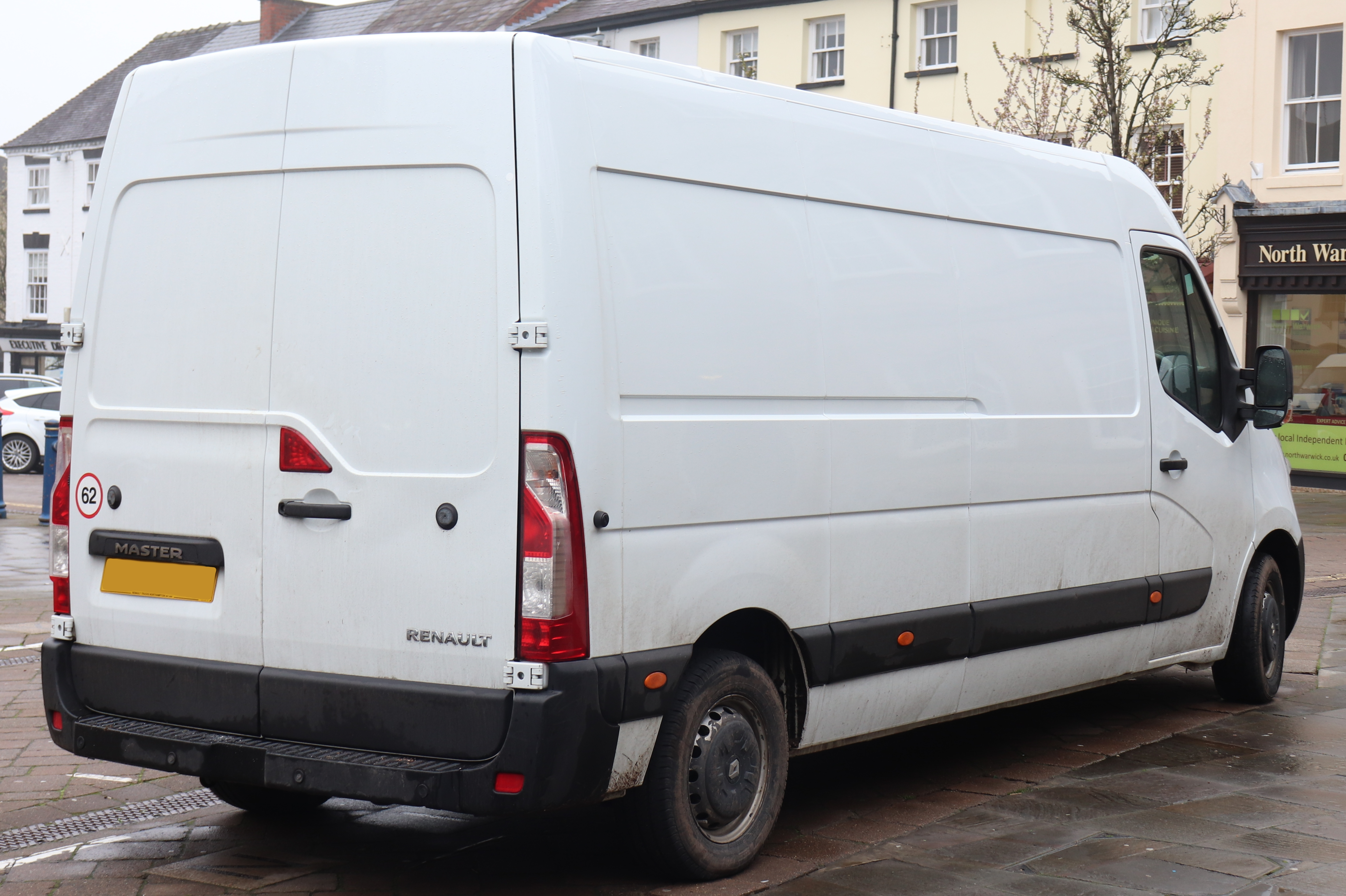
Renault Master panel van

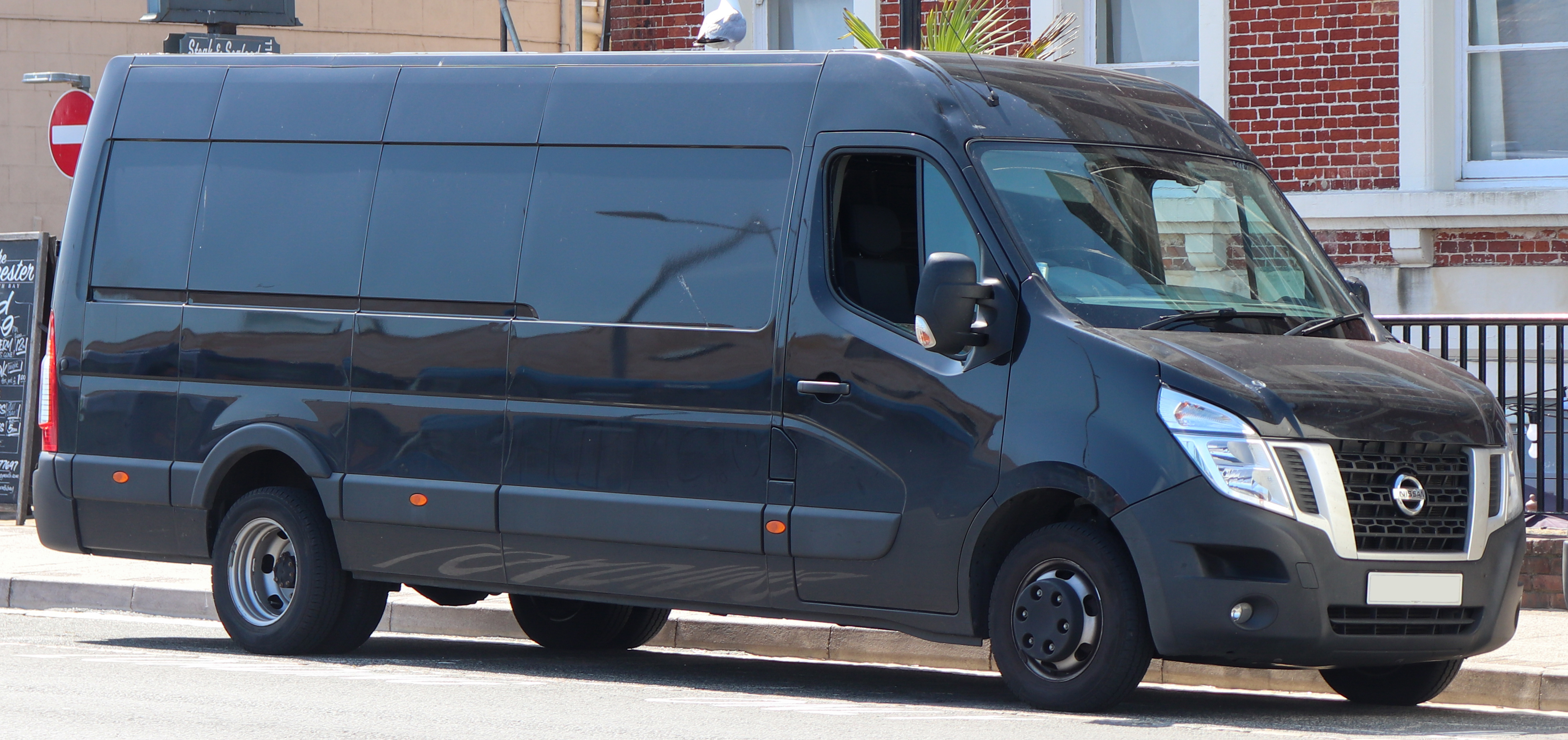
Nissan NV400 panel van

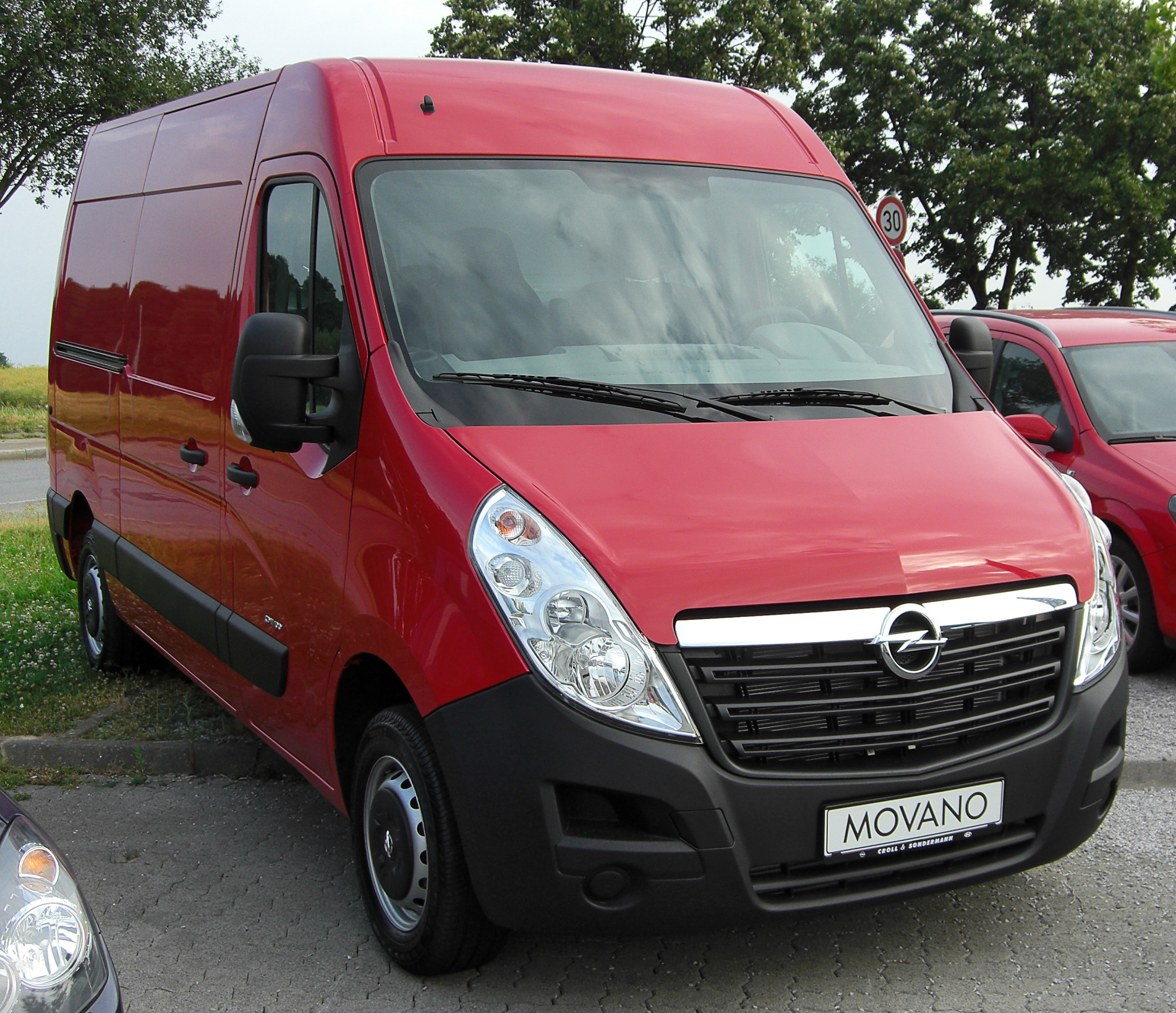
Opel Movano B medium roof, long wheelbase panel van

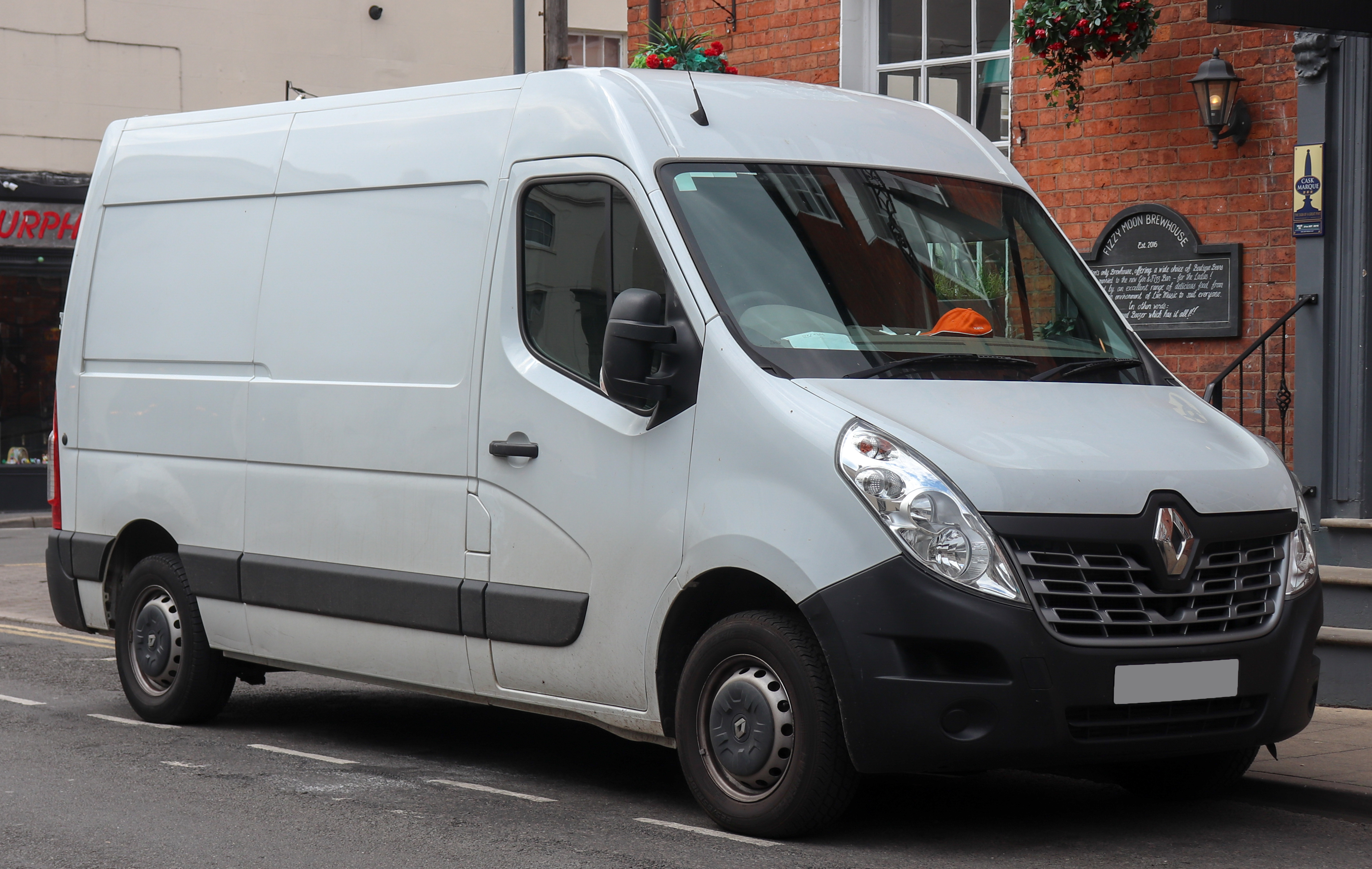
Renault Master (2014–2019)

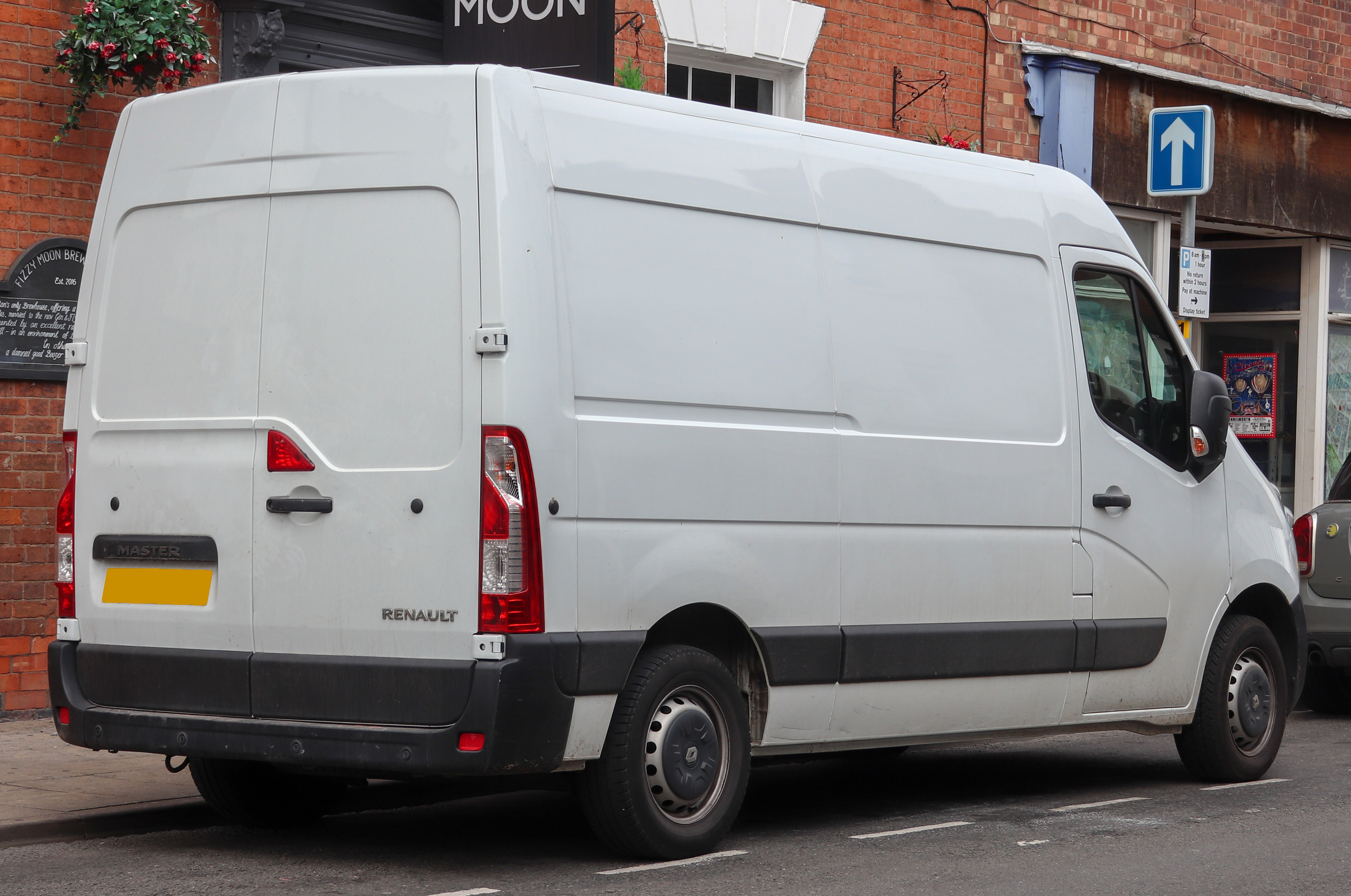
Renault Master (2014–2019)

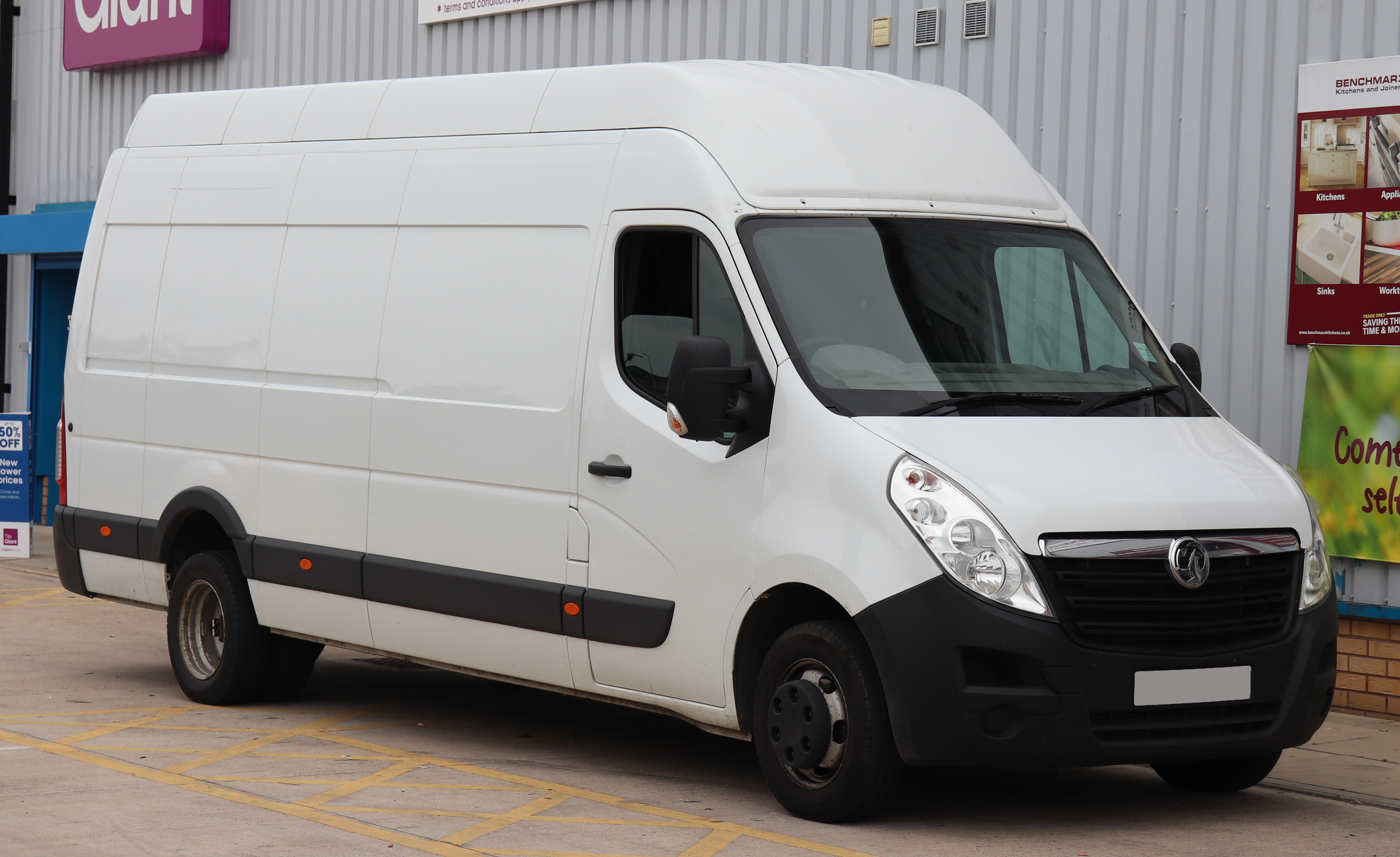
Vauxhall Movano (Pre-facelift)

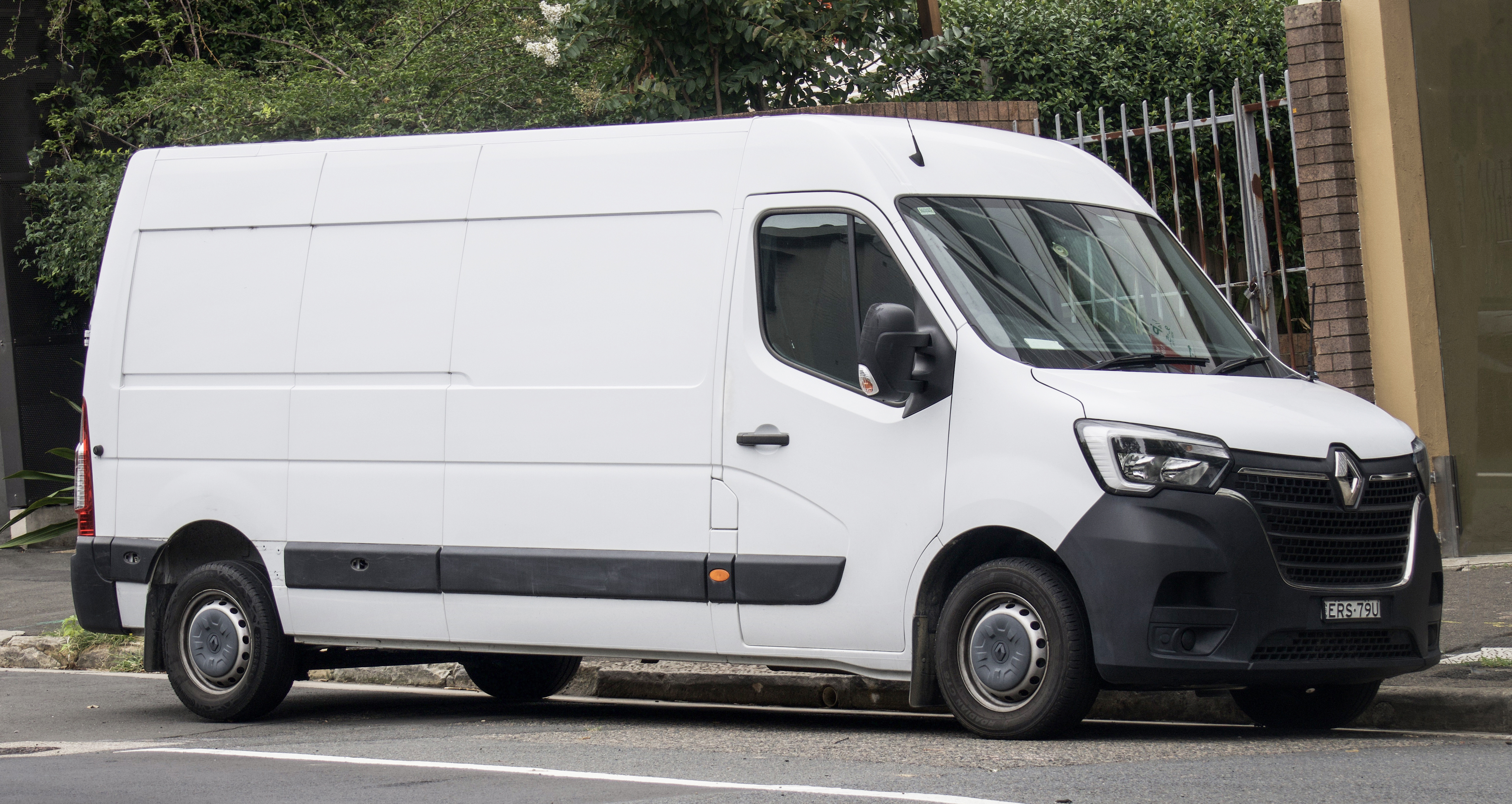
Renault Master (2019–2024)

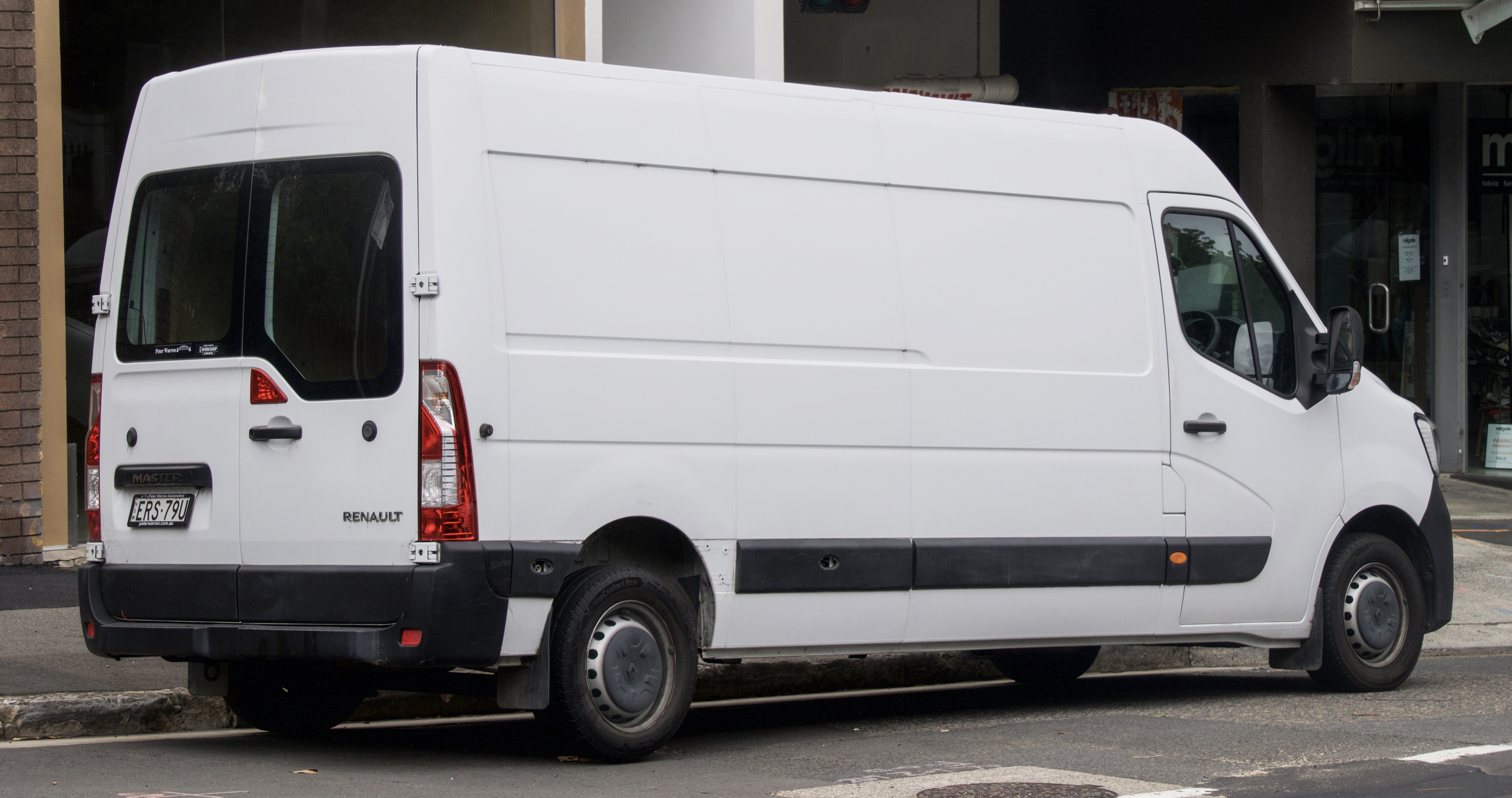
Renault Master (2019–2024)

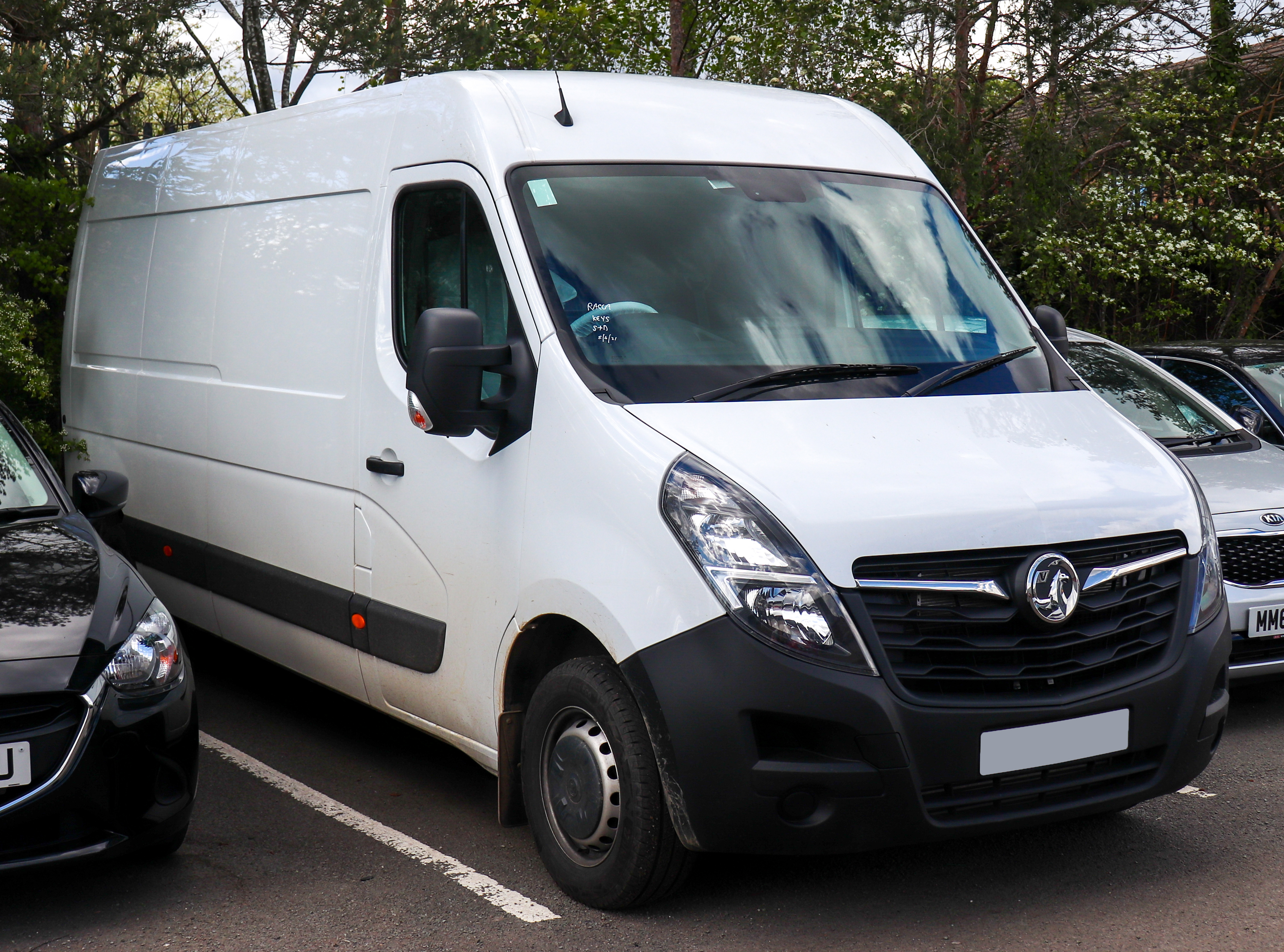
Vauxhall Movano (Post-facelift)

Key Master (3rd generation) dimensions
Length Height				L1 (Note: Front-wheel drive only)		L2	L3 (RWD)	L3 (FWD)	L4 (Note: Rear-wheel drive only)
Length Height				Exterior	5,075 mm (199.8 in)	5,575 mm (219.5 in)	6,225 mm (245.1 in)		6,875 mm (270.7 in)
Length Height				WB	3,182 mm (125.3 in)	3,682 mm (145.0 in)		4,332 mm (170.6 in)	
Length Height				Interior (Note: Interior width is 1,765 mm (69.5 in) for all versions, 1,380 mm (54.3 in) between the internal wheel arches.)	2,583 mm (101.7 in)	3,083 mm (121.4 in)	3,733 mm (147.0 in)		4,383 mm (172.6 in)
H1	Exterior	Interior	Volume	8 m^{3} (280 ft^{3})		N/A			
H1	2,307 mm (90.8 in)	1,700 mm (66.9 in)	Volume	8 m^{3} (280 ft^{3})		N/A			
H2	2,488–2,557 mm (98.0–100.7 in)	1,894 mm (74.6 in); 1,798 mm (70.8 in)	Volume	9 m^{3} (320 ft^{3})		10.8 m^{3} (380 ft^{3})	13 m^{3} (460 ft^{3})		14.9 m^{3} (530 ft^{3})
H3	2,744–2,815 mm (108.0–110.8 in)	2,144 mm (84.4 in); 2,048 mm (80.6 in)	Volume	N/A		12.3 m^{3} (430 ft^{3})	14.8 m^{3} (520 ft^{3})		17.0 m^{3} (600 ft^{3})

=== Master Z.E. and E-Tech ===
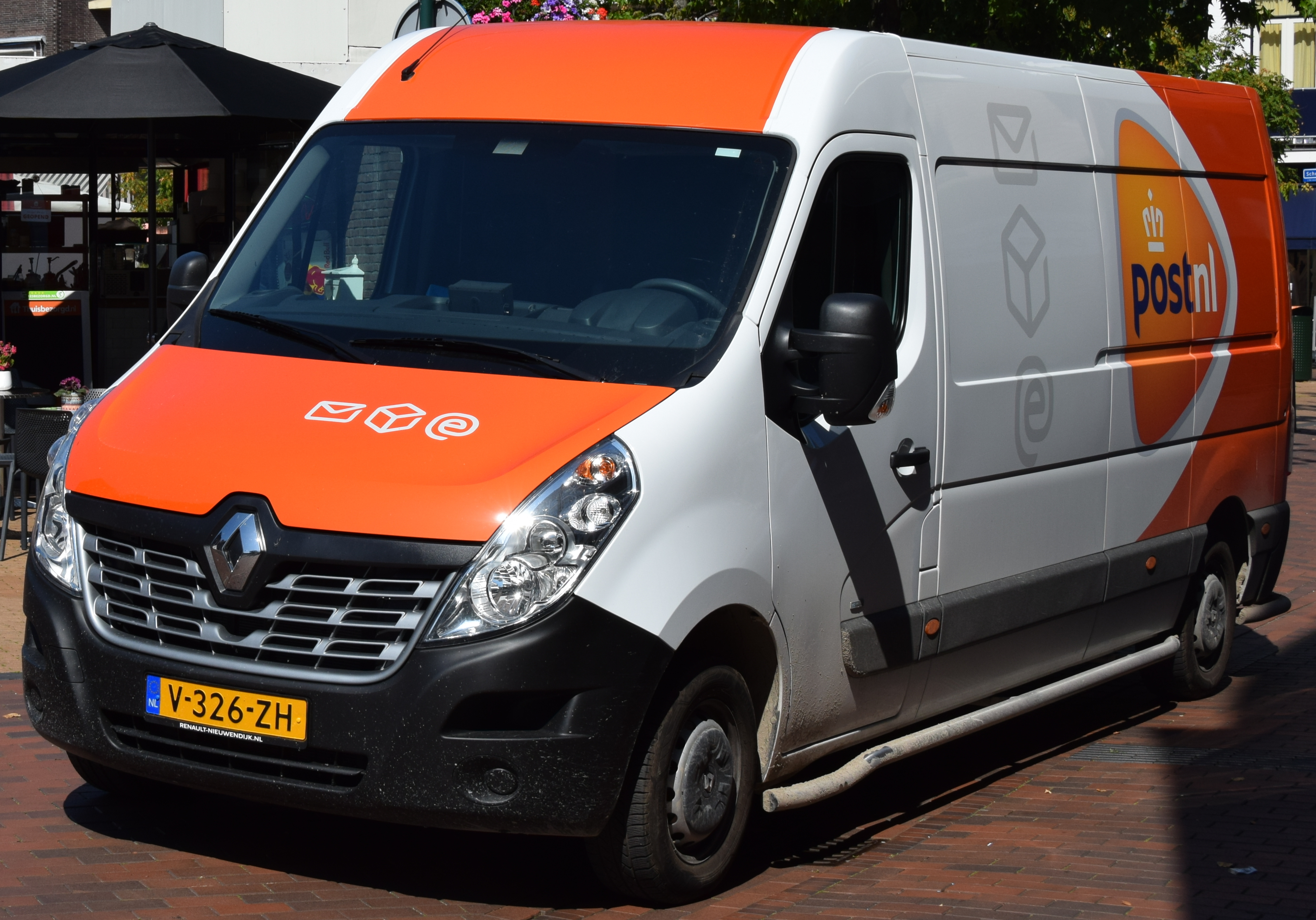
Renault Master Z.E. in service with PostNL.

The Master Z.E. was introduced in 2018 as a battery electric vehicle with a 33 kWh lithium-ion battery and the 57 kW (76 hp) "R75" electric traction motor from the contemporaneous Zoe and Kangoo Z.E., providing a driving range of 120 km (75 mi) under the WLTP cycle. Maximum torque output is 225 N⋅m (166 lbf⋅ft). The battery capacity was increased to 52 kWh in spring 2022, extending the range to 190 km (120 mi) (WLTP). In the UK, the newer variant with larger range now is marketed as the Master E-Tech instead. It will go on sale in the Australian market in 2024.

The battery can be recharged at 7.4 kW (AC); the newer 52 kWh variant adds the ability to use a DC charger, but is limited to 22 kW.

The electric variants did not apply to the Opel/Vauxhall and Nissan models.

=== Master Van H2-Tech ===
At the 2022 Paris Motor Show, HYVIA presented a production version of the Master Van H2-Tech, which runs on hydrogen.

=== Safety ===
ANCAP test results Renault Master all variants (2022)
Overall
Grading:	24% (Bronze)

== Fourth generation (XDD; 2024) ==
Fourth generation (XDD)
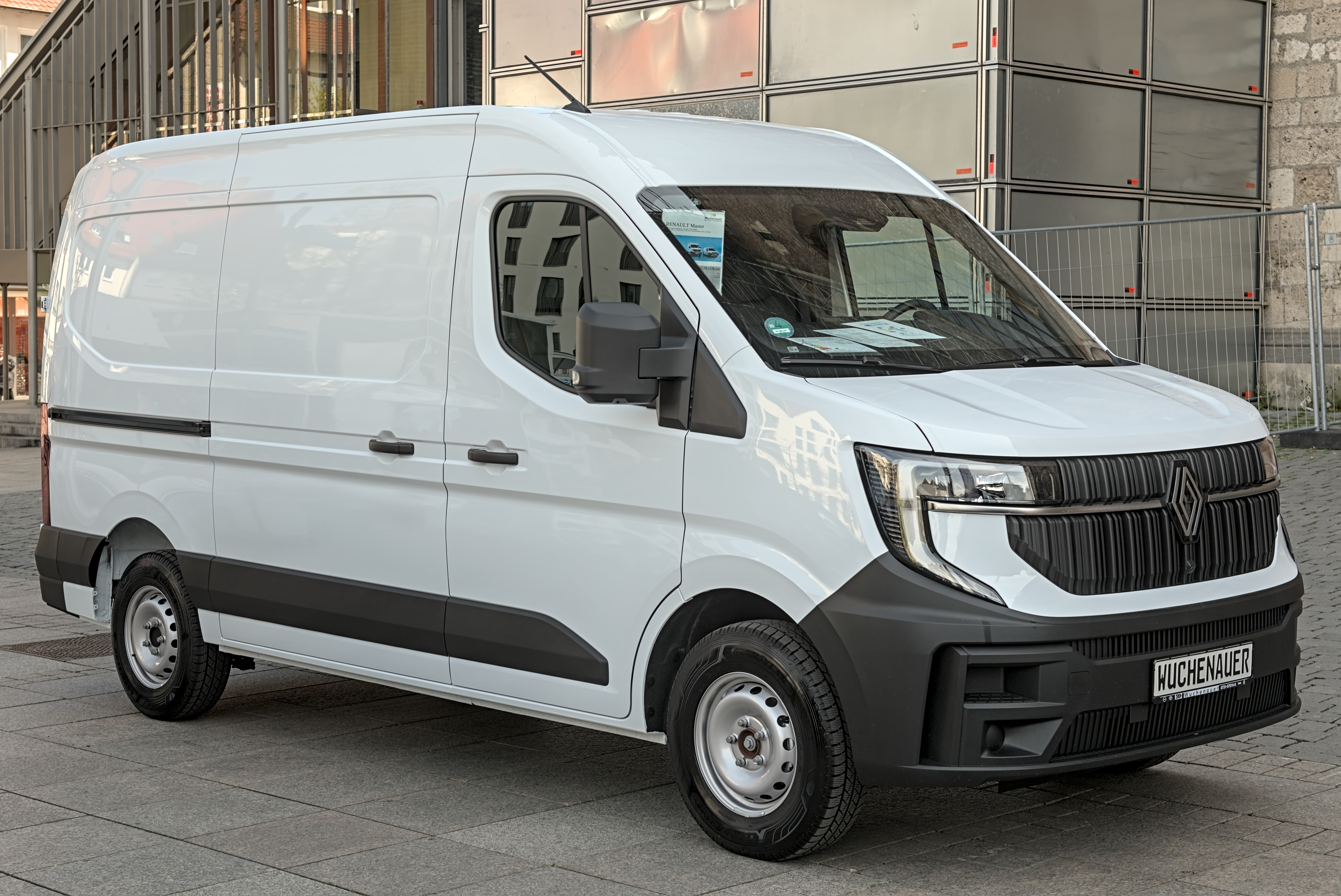

Overview
- Also called: Nissan Interstar
- Production: 2024–present

Powertrain
- Engine: Diesel: 2.0 L Blue dCi

The fourth generation Master was unveiled on November 21, 2023, at the Solutrans Motor Show in Lyon. It is available with internal combustion, electric, or hydrogen powertrains.

It was named International Van of the Year 2025 on September 16, 2023, making it the fifth van from the French manufacturer to win the award.

A new generation of the Nissan Interstar, derived from this utility vehicle, was unveiled in February 2024.

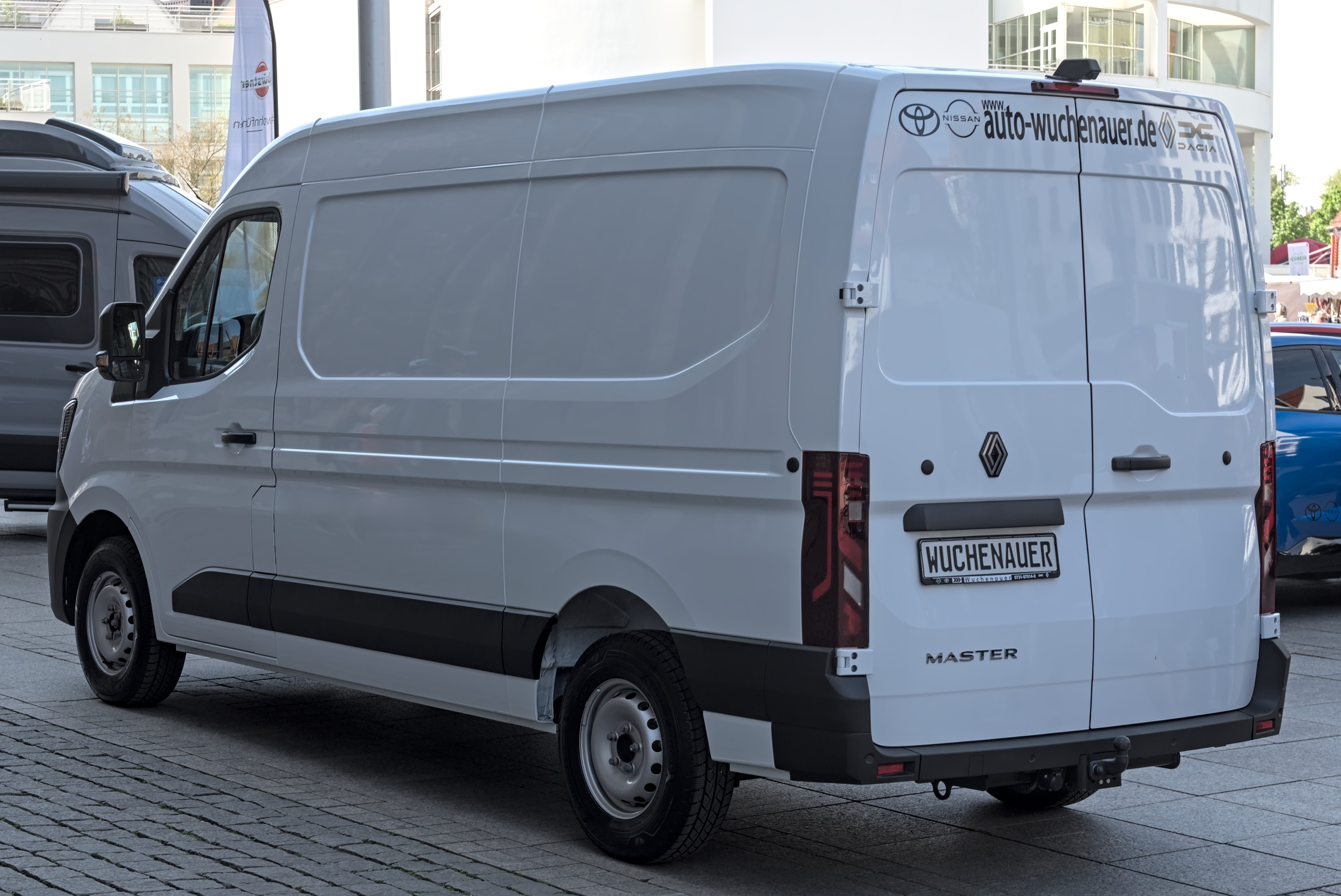
Rear view

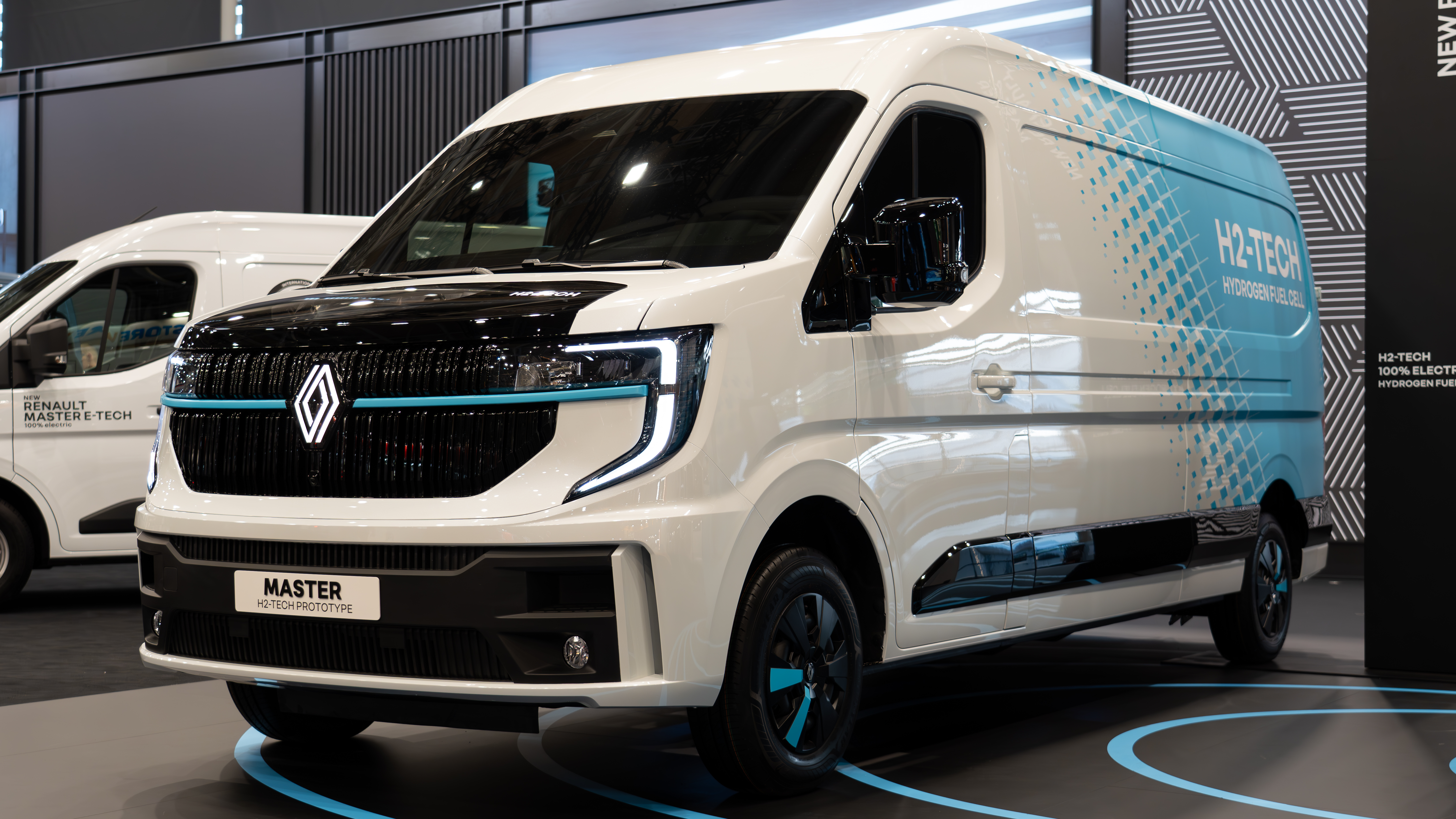
Renault Master H2-Tech Prototype

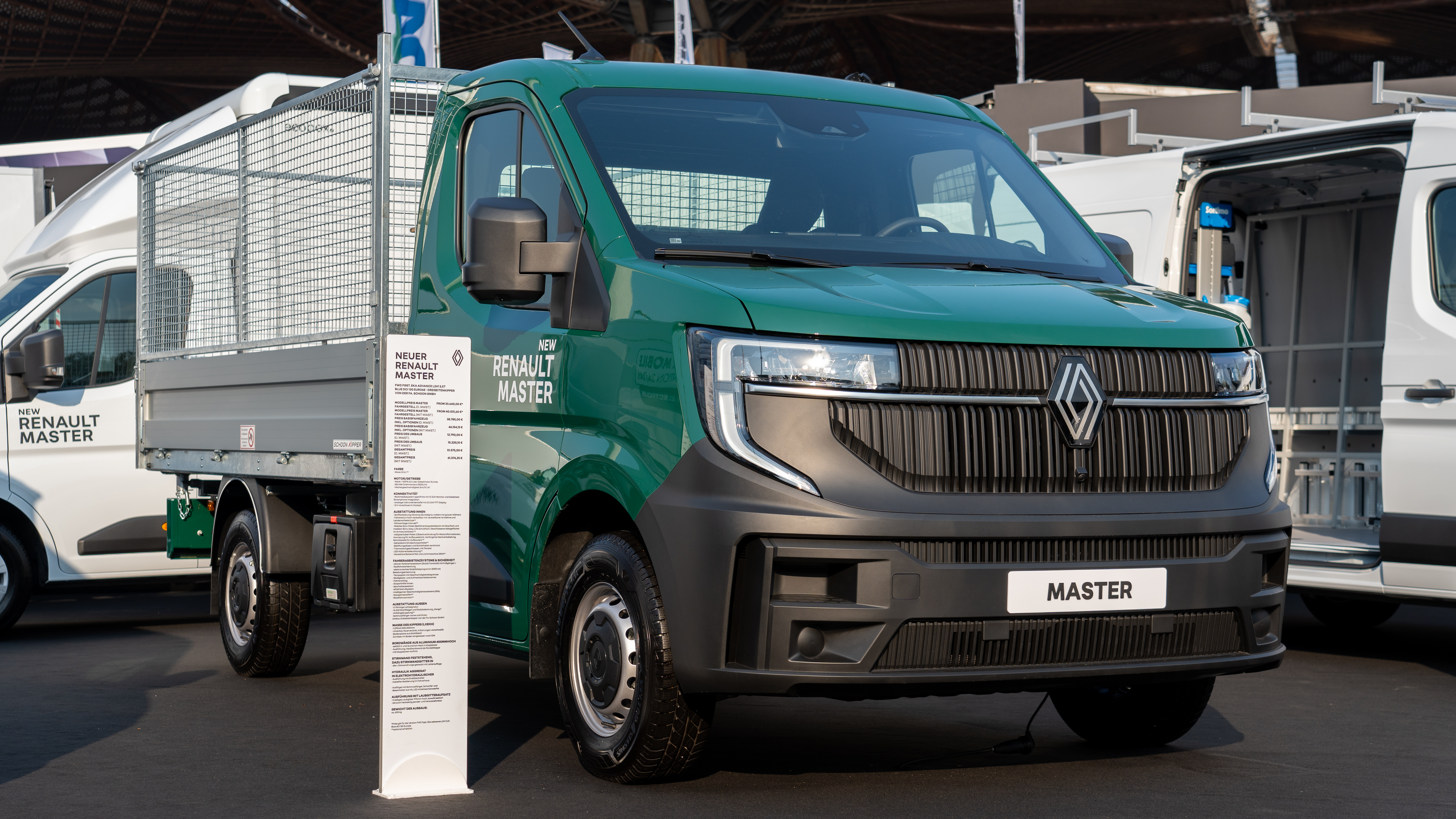
Renault Master Truck

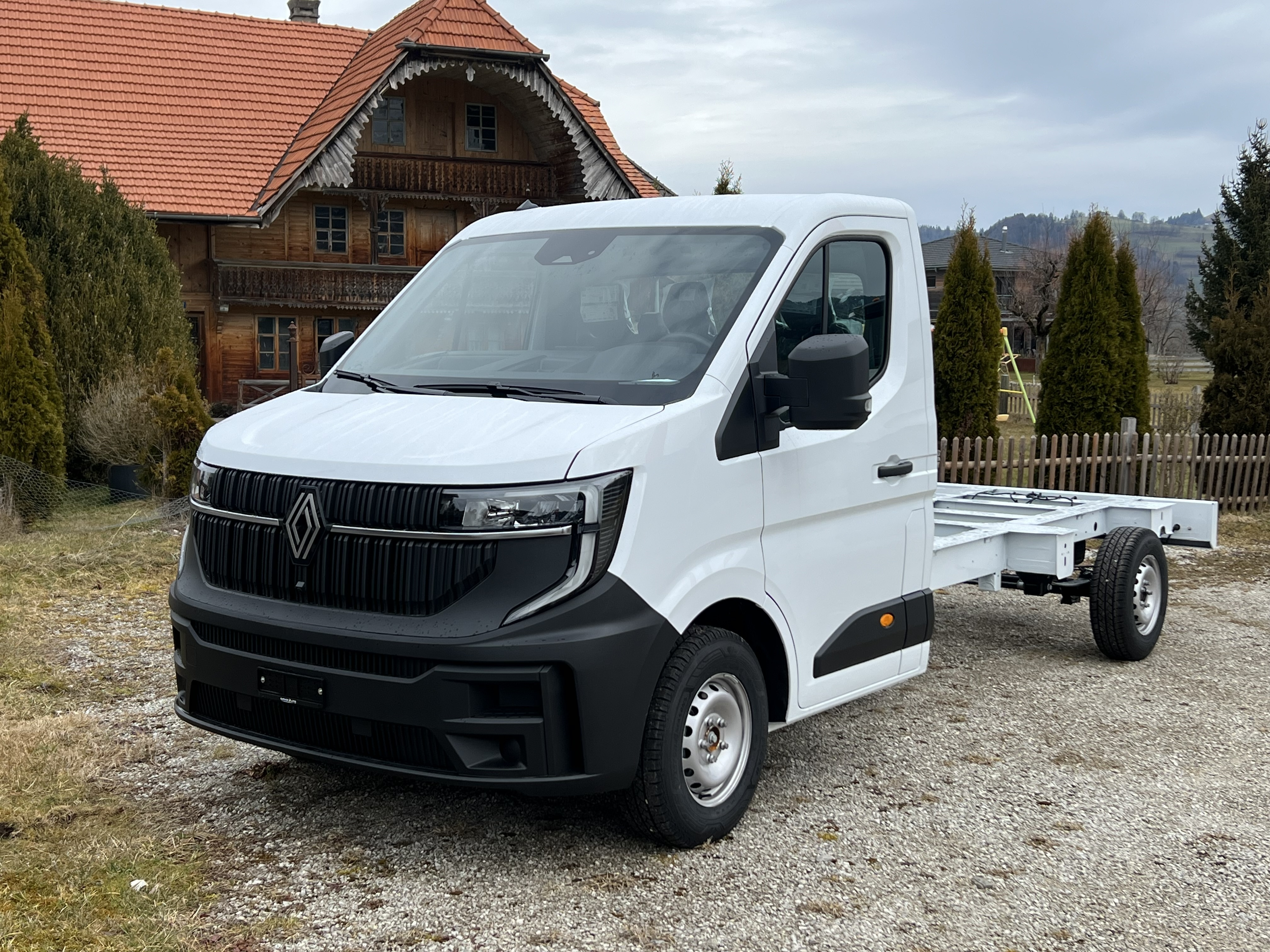
Renault Master Chassis Cab

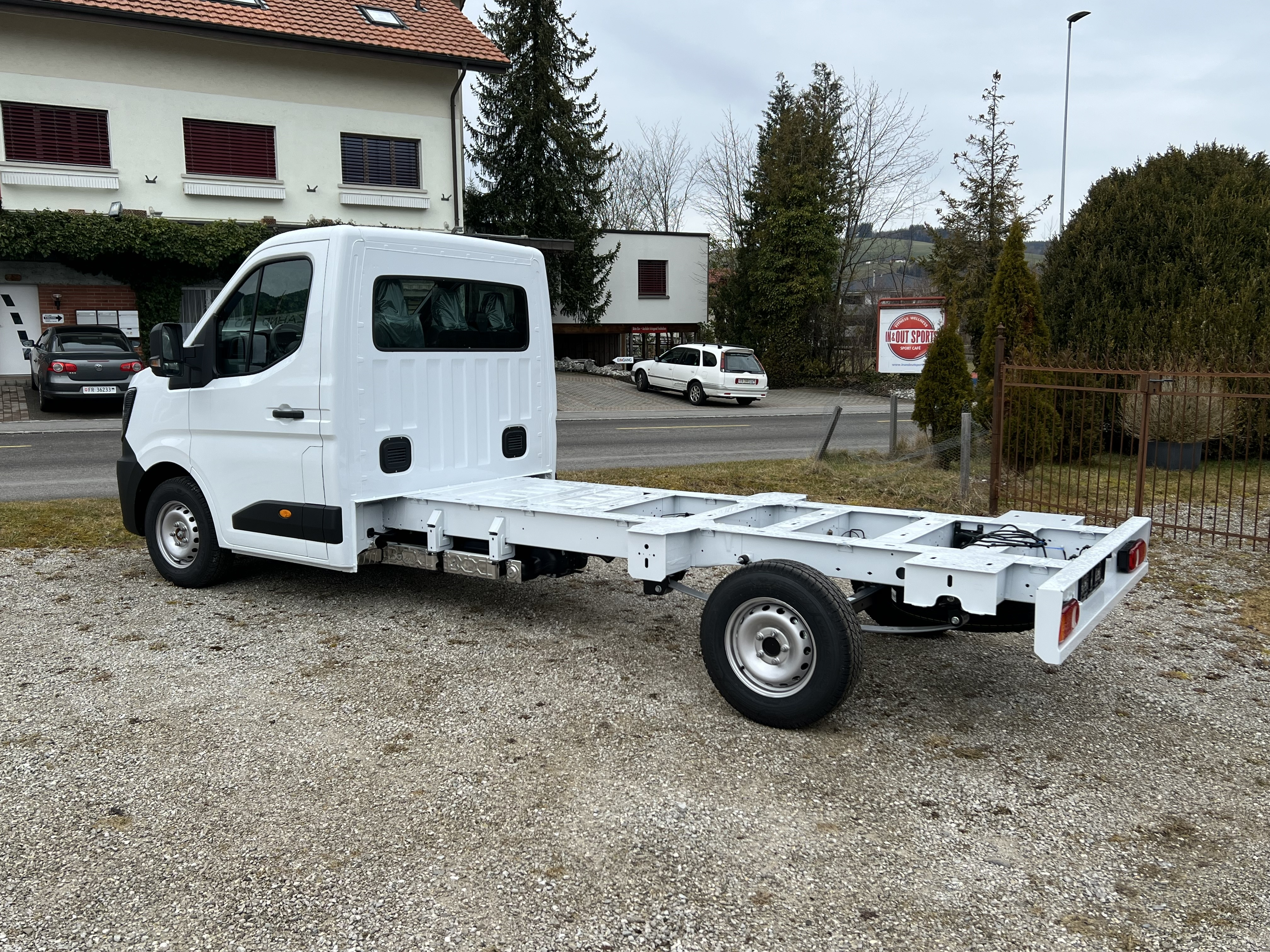
Rear view

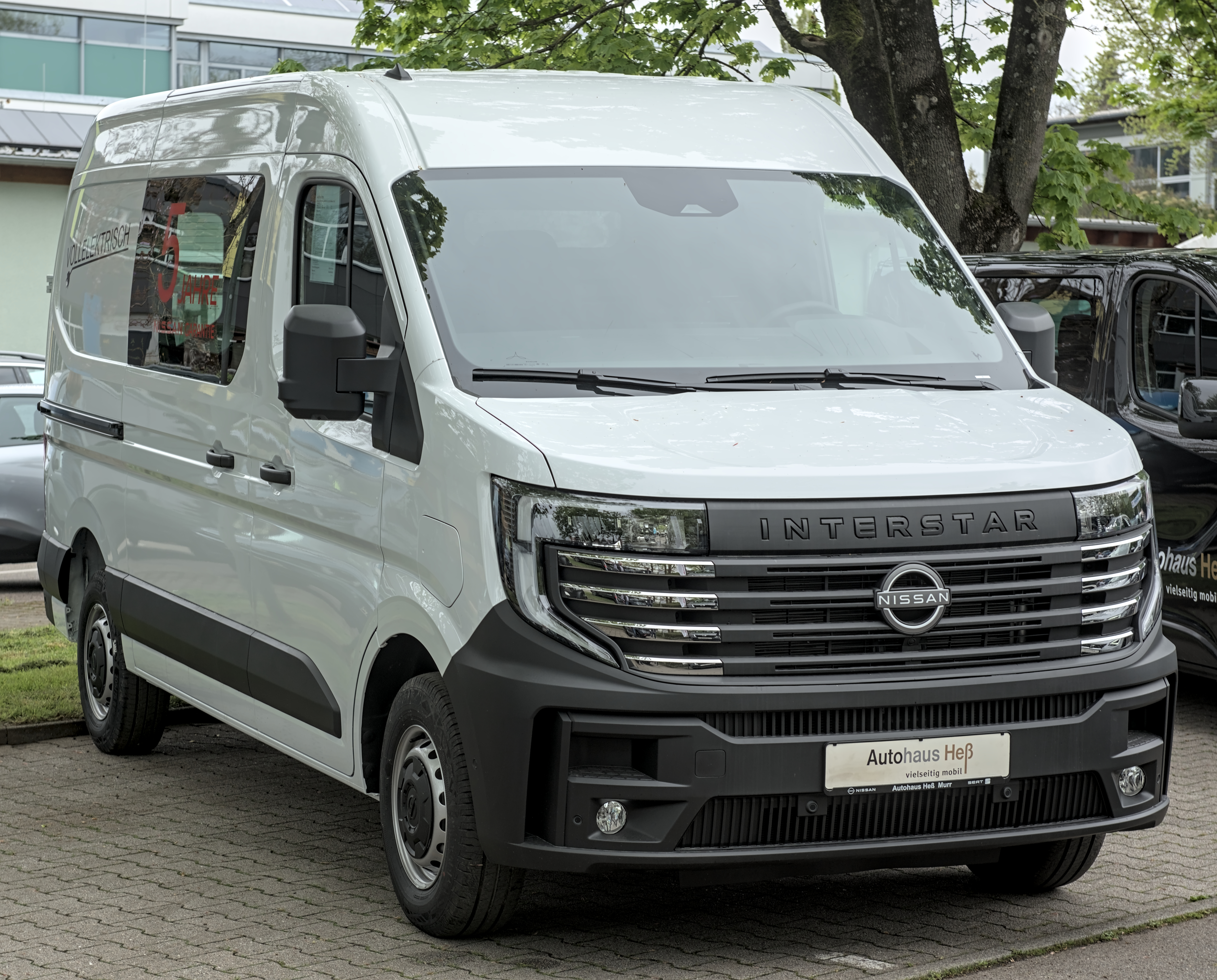
Nissan Interstar-e (2024–)

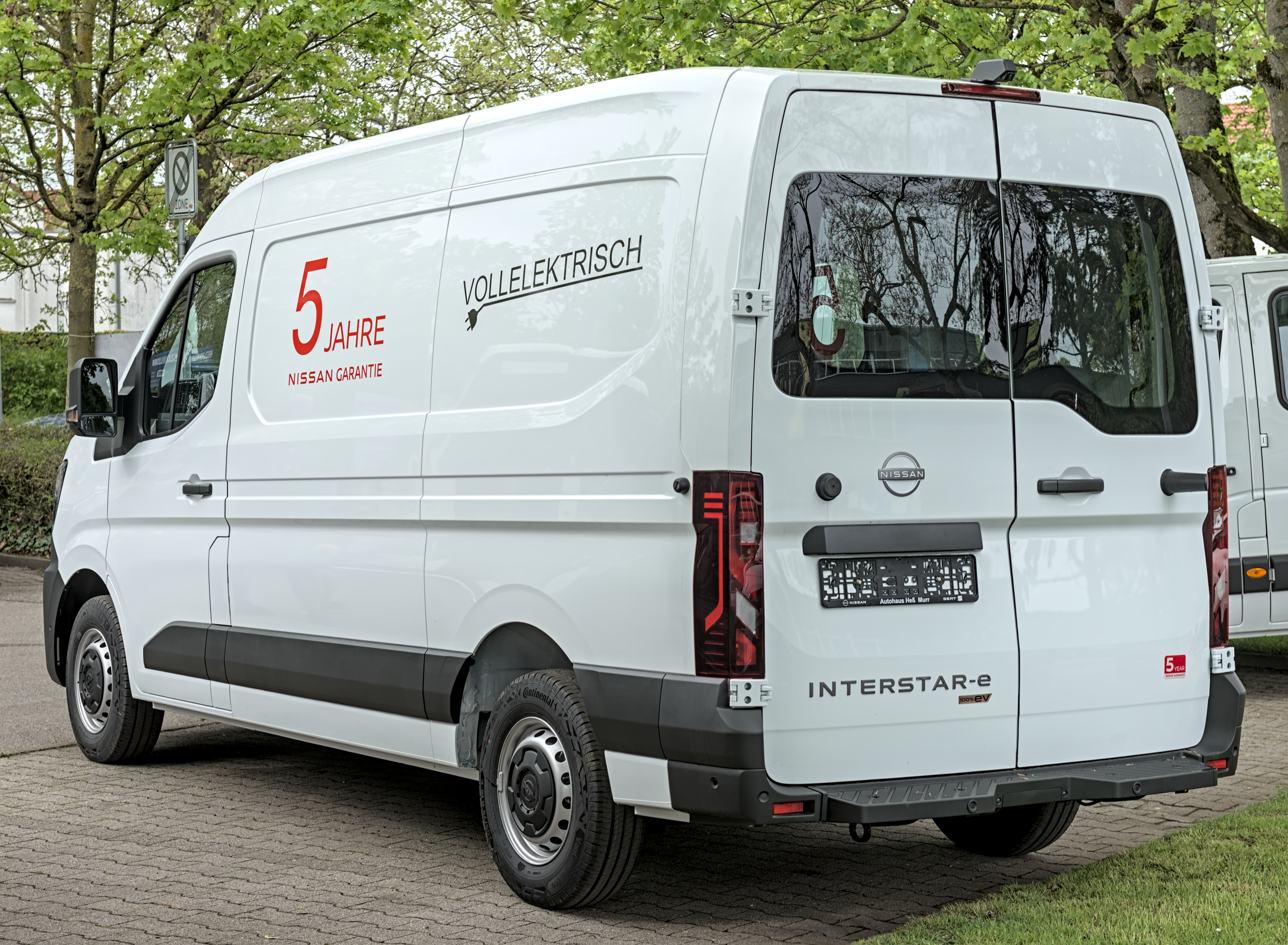
Rear view

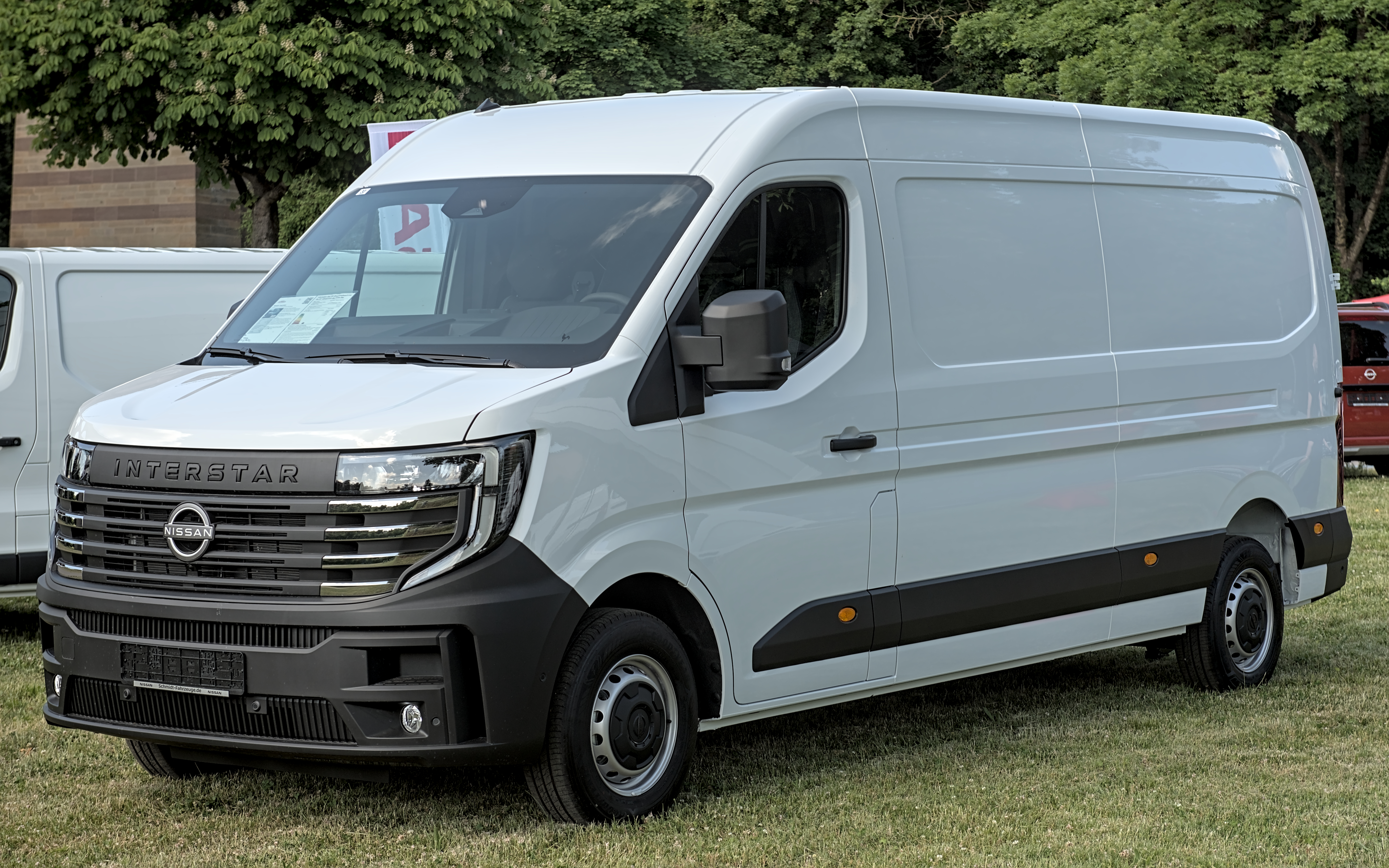
Nissan Interstar long wheelbase panel van

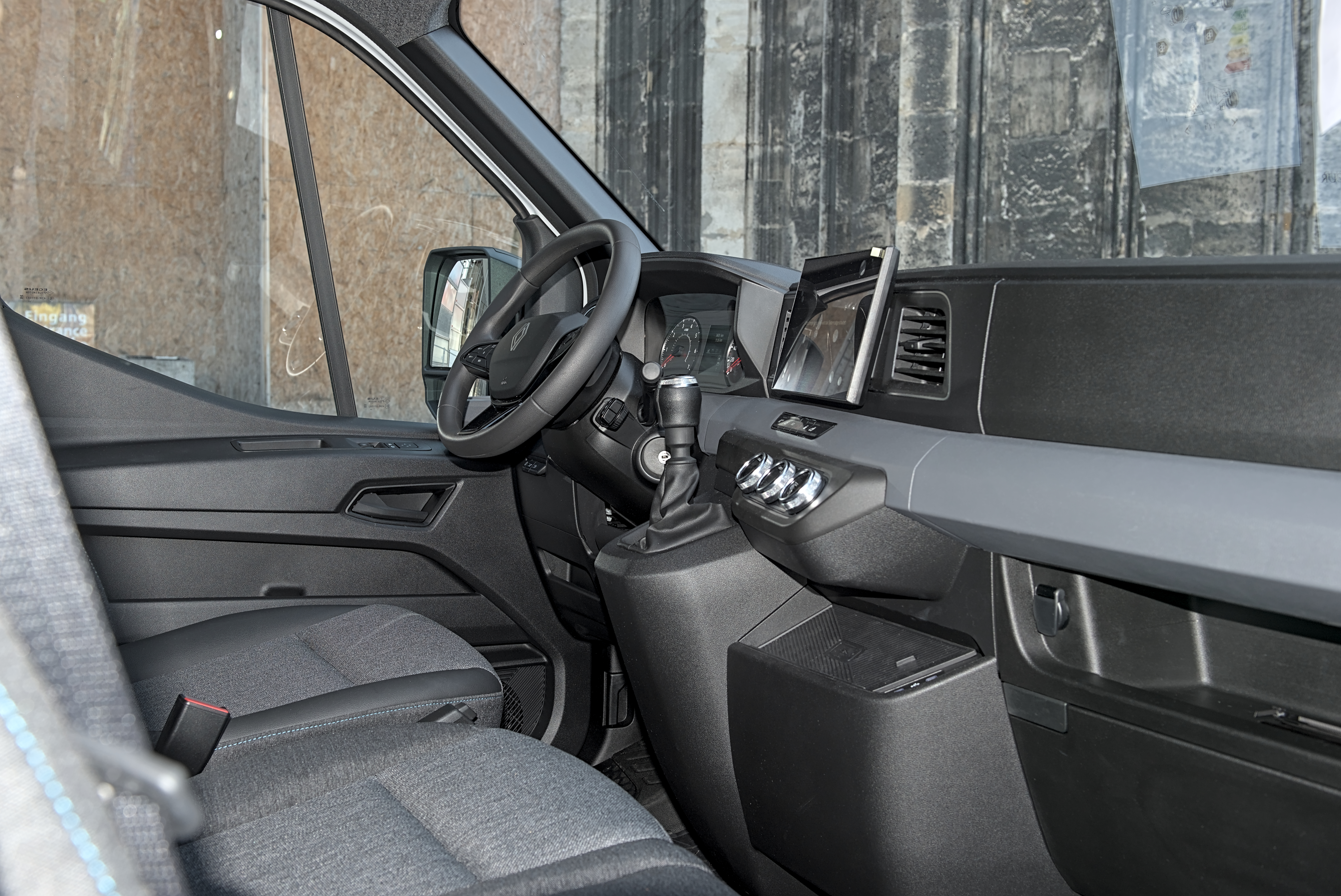
Interior

=== Safety ===
Euro NCAP test results Renault Master (2025)
Test	Score
Overall:	5 /5 stars
Safe driving	73%
Crash avoidance	76%
Post crash	80%

Euro NCAP test results Nissan Interstar (2025)
Test	Score
Overall:	5 /5 stars
Safe driving	73%
Crash avoidance	76%
Post crash	80%

== Sales ==
Year	Brazil
2003	1,308
2004	2,400
2005	2,577
2006	2,767
2007	3,685
2008	4,122
2009	3,827
2010	5,723
2011	7,396
2012	8,577
2013	10,005
2014	12,225
2015	8,373
2016	6,399
2017	6,185
2018	7,184
2019	8,479
2020	5,498
2021	9,678
2022	10,012
2023	10,608
2024	11,169
2025	15,773
