= CAESAR self-propelled howitzer =

French 155 mm artillery

CAESAR
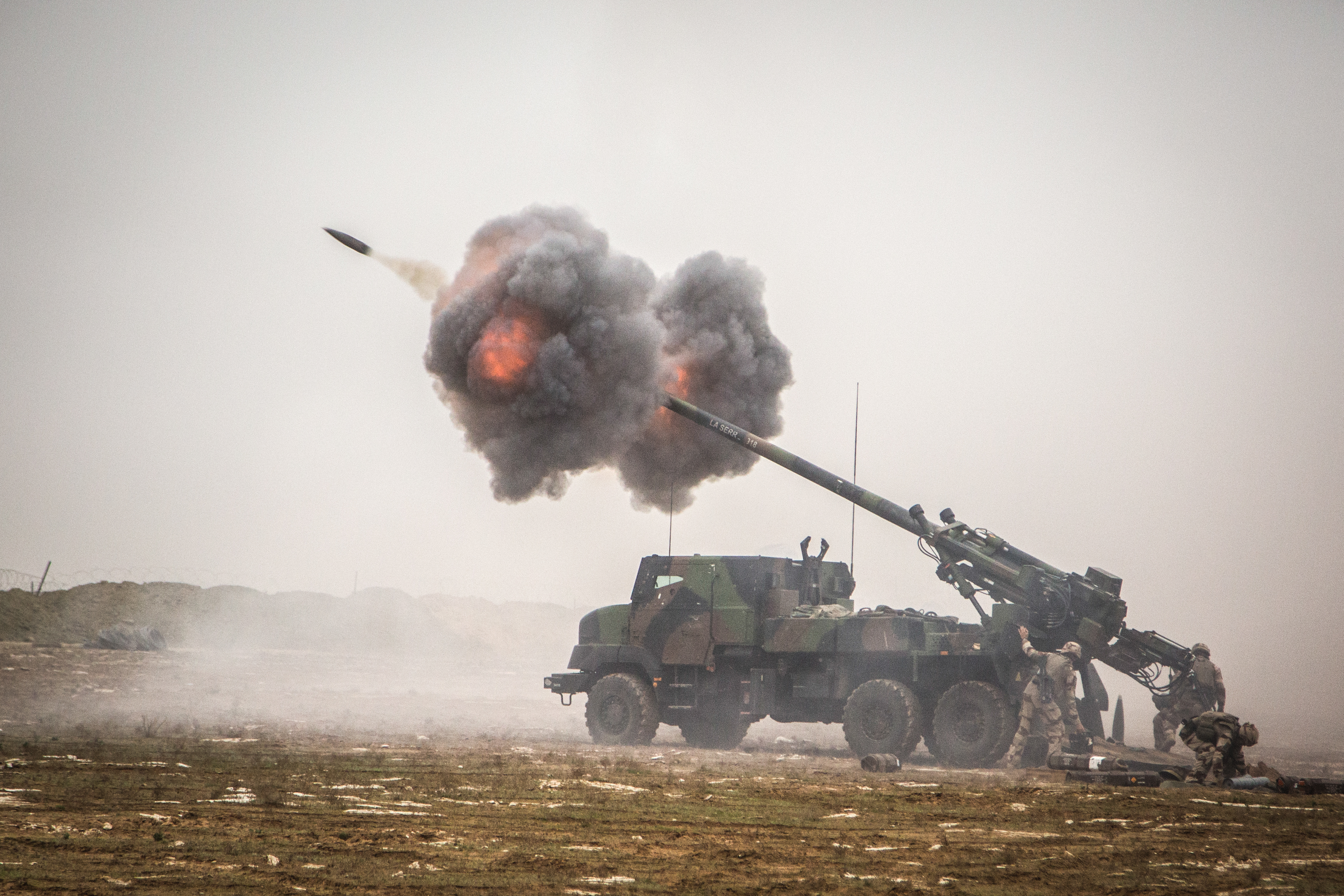
- French artillerymen firing into the Middle Euphrates River Valley (Syria) from within Iraq (December 2018)
- Type: Self-propelled cannon
- Place of origin: France

Service history
- In service: 2008–present
- Wars: War in Afghanistan (2001–2021); Cambodian–Thai border stand-off Operation Serval; Operation Chammal; Battle of Mosul (2016–2017); Battle of Baghuz; Russian invasion of Ukraine

Production history
- Designed: 1992–1999
- Manufacturer: KNDS France
- Produced: 2004–present

Specifications
- Mass: Mk1 (Sherpa 5 6×6): 17.7 t (39,000 lb); Mk1 (Tatra 815-7 8×8): 28.7 to 30.2 t (63,000 to 67,000 lb); Mk2 (6×6): < 26.7 t (59,000 lb)
- Length: Mk1 (Sherpa 5 6×6): 10 m (33 ft); Mk1 (Tatra 817 8×8): 10 m (33 ft); Mk2 (6×6): 10 m (33 ft)
- Width: Mk1 (Sherpa 5 6×6): 2.55 m (8.4 ft); Mk1 (Tatra 817 8×8): 2.8 m (9.2 ft); Mk2 (6×6): 2.55 m (8.4 ft)
- Height: Mk1 (Sherpa 5 6×6): 3.7 m (12 ft); Mk1 (Tatra 817 8×8): 3.1 m (10 ft); Mk2 (6×6): 3.6 m (12 ft)
- Crew: 5–6 (3, emergency)
- Rate of fire: 6 rounds per minute
- Effective firing range: ERFB: 4.5 to 40 km (2.8 to 24.9 mi); Rocket assisted shell: 55 km (34 mi); Excalibur shell: 46 km (29 mi)
- Main armament: 155 mm, L/52 calibre
- Secondary armament: None
- Engine: Diesel
- Operational range: 600 km (370 mi)
- Maximum speed: On-road: 100 km/h (62 mph); Off-road: 50 km/h (31 mph)

The Camion Équipé d'un Système d'Artillerie (English: "Truck equipped with an artillery system") or CAESAR is a French 155 mm, 52-caliber self-propelled gun that can fire 39/52 caliber NATO-standard shells. It is installed on a 6×6 or 8×8 truck chassis. Equipped with an autonomous weapon network incorporating an inertial navigation system and ballistic computer, the CAESAR can accurately strike targets more than 40 kilometres (25 mi) away using "Extended Range, Full Bore" (ERFB) ammunition with base bleed, and targets over 55 km (34 mi) away using rocket-assisted or smart ammunition.

The CAESAR was developed by the French defence contractor GIAT Industries (now KNDS France), and has been exported to various countries. Units manufactured for the French Army use a 6×6 Renault Sherpa 5 chassis, while some export customers have opted for systems integrated on a 6×6 Unimog U2450L or 8×8 Tatra 817 chassis.

In February 2022, the French government awarded Nexter a contract for the development of a new generation CAESAR system. Marketed by the company as the CAESAR Mark II (also commonly referred to as CAESAR NG in France), 109 systems are to be delivered to the French Army between 2026 and 2030.

== Development ==
In the early 1990s, the French Army operated two artillery systems designed and manufactured by the state-owned company GIAT: the AuF1 tracked self-propelled howitzer, which had reached the end of its production run, and the TRF1 towed howitzer, which was beginning to be delivered, but in reduced numbers. Absent further orders for its products, GIAT might have had to shut down its artillery program for unprofitability, permanently losing an important industrial capability. Since the French Ministry of Defence had expressed no interest in acquiring or funding new artillery designs at the time, the firm had to use its own funds to develop a 155 mm (6.1 in) system that could attract export customers.

Per the then-emerging NATO standard, the new design would need a 52-caliber barrel, which would offer greater accuracy and longer range than the 39-caliber barrels on GIAT's existing models. For strategic mobility, the system would have to be air-transportable on a C-130 along with an entire gun crew and 18 rounds of ammunition. Using the TRF1 and its usual tow vehicle, the Renault TRM 10000, as a baseline, the project team determined that mounting the gun directly on a truck bed would reduce overall material costs. After designing a subframe and a rear anchoring platform to filter and dissipate the gun's recoil, the team chose to adapt the Unimog U2450 truck as the system's base. In cooperation with Unimog importer Lohr Industrie (now Soframe), which supplied the cab and helped design the interface between the truck and the subframe, GIAT produced the first prototype in less than a year and displayed it at the Eurosatory defence industry fair in June 1994.

Four years later, a second pre-production model underwent trials with the French Army in 1998 and the Malaysian Army in 1999. Based on this early performance, the Direction Générale de l'Armement (DGA) ordered five additional prototypes for further testing in September 2000. After delivery was completed in June 2003, the French Army formed an "experimental" artillery section that used the prototypes to develop military doctrine for future CAESAR-equipped units. The findings convinced the French Army to order more CAESARs instead of continuing to upgrade its AuF1 self-propelled howitzers to the AuF2 standard. Thus, in December 2004, the DGA awarded GIAT a €300 million contract to produce 72 new CAESARs, upgrade the five vehicles already delivered, supply an initial amount of ammunition, and provide maintenance to the fleet for five years. The new systems would have a new purpose-built truck chassis, the Sherpa 5 by Renault Trucks Defence (RTD), instead of the Unimog-Soframe chassis of the prototypes.

In 2006, the year that the company was reorganised and renamed to Nexter, GIAT received the first export orders for the CAESAR, from the Royal Thai Army (RTD chassis) and the Saudi Arabian National Guard (Unimog-Soframe chassis). Well before the French, Thai, or Saudi orders were completely fulfilled, the French Army began to use the CAESAR in combat, deploying eight systems to Afghanistan in 2009.

In peacetime the production rate at Nexter was reportedly 10 CAESARs per year. The 2022 Russian invasion of Ukraine boosted demand. By early 2023 Nexter's factory in Bourges was producing between two and four units per month in continuous operation. The next milestone expected is to produce eight CAESARs a month by December 2023.

=== Optimised ammunition ===
GIAT and its successor companies have developed and produced 155 mm (6.1 in) rounds designed to maximise the range of the CAESAR, such as the LU 211, which is manufactured at Les Forges de Tarbes, within the confines of the town arsenal. The forge was privatised in November 2021 by a French firm which had recently been recapitalised by €100 million. In 2020, the Minister of the Armed Forces signed a contract worth €25 million for the plant to supply shells to the French Army for the decade. The privatisation furnished €9 million each year for the 2021–2024 period. In autumn 2021, the firm supplied an extra €2 million to modernise the plant, which also produces 120 mm ammunition for the Leclerc tank.

== Variants ==
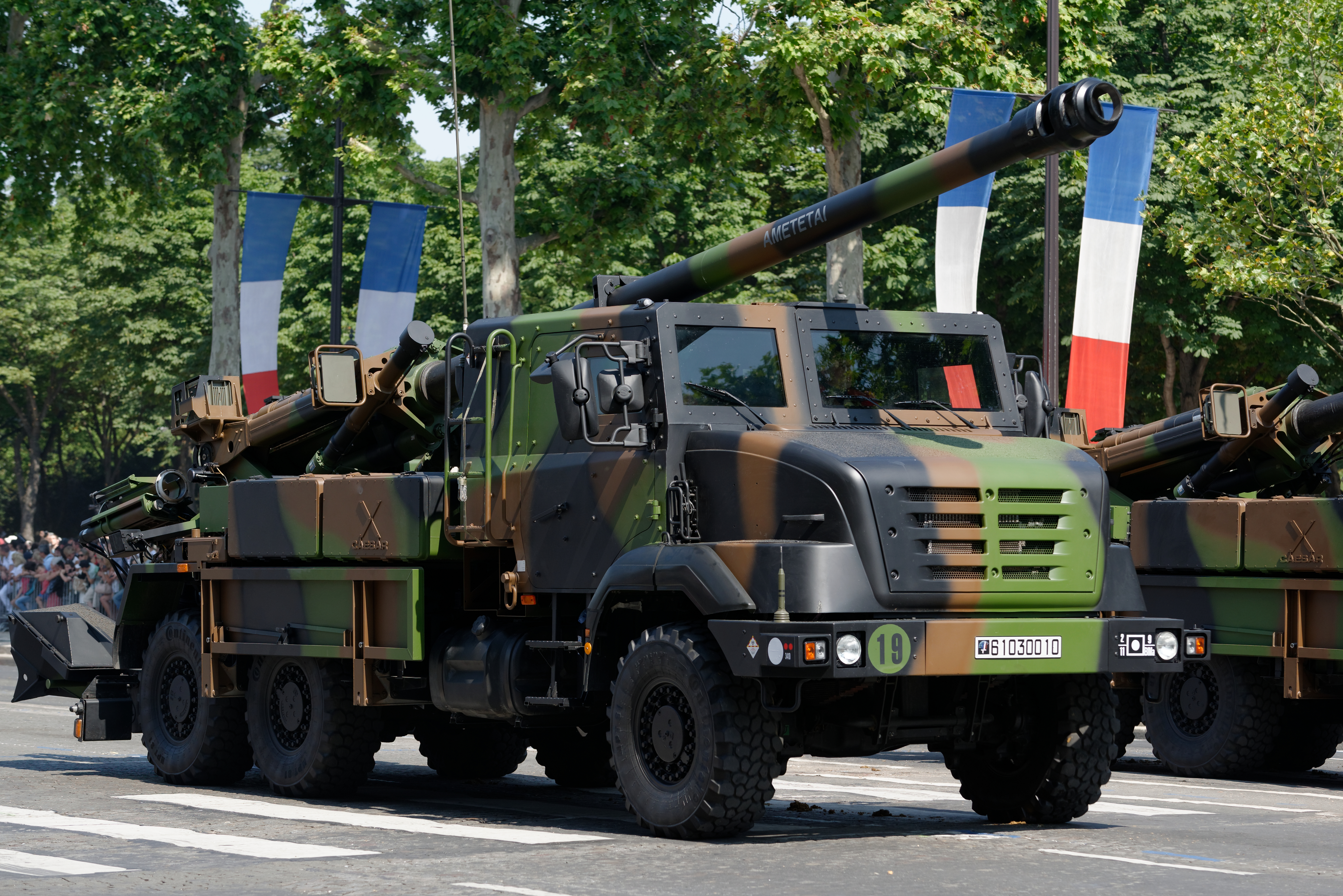
A CAESAR howitzer of the French Army's 9th Light Armoured Marine Brigade during the 2013 Bastille Day Parade

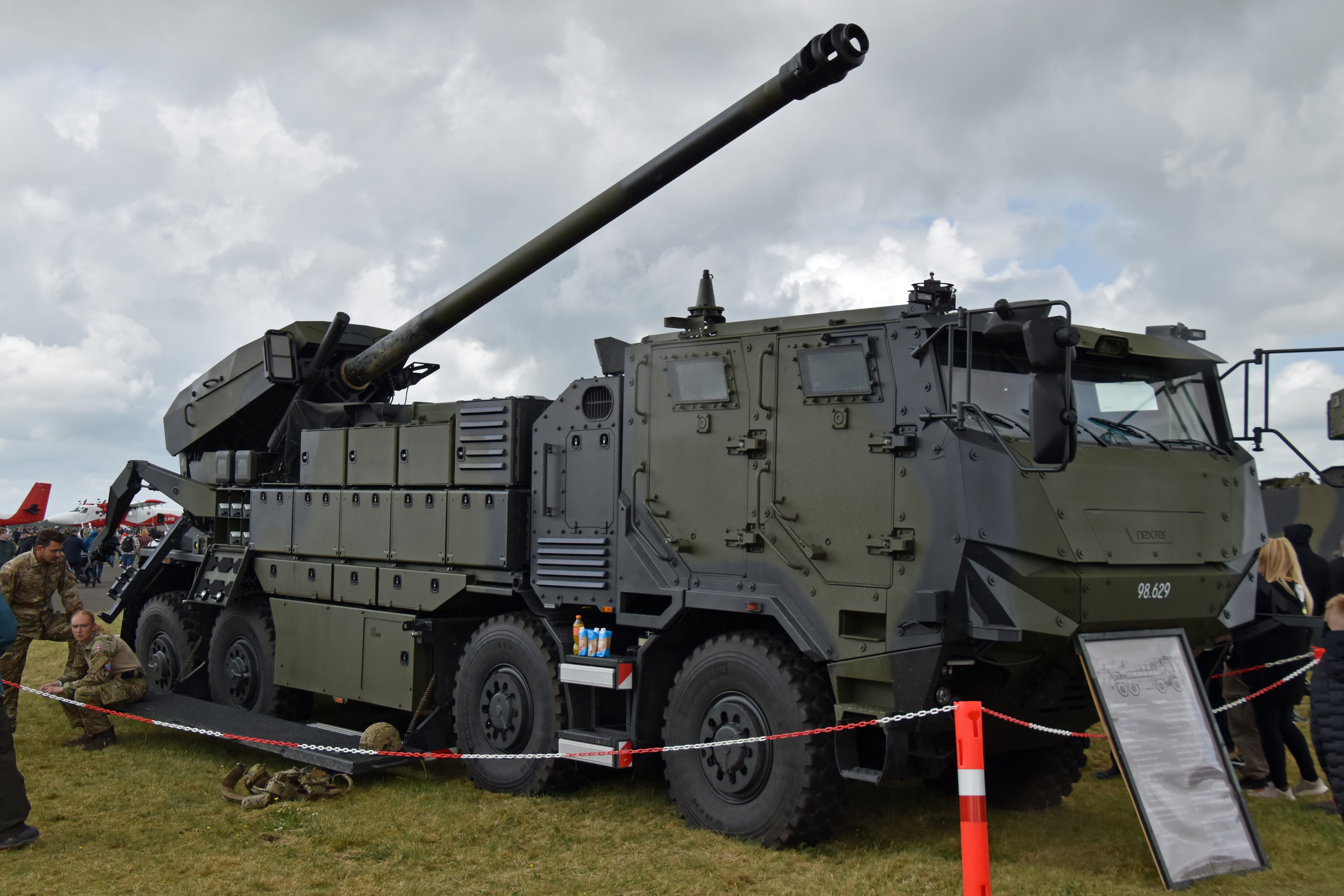
CAESAR 8x8 of the Royal Danish Army on a Tatra 815-7 chassis

=== CAESAR 6×6 Mark I ===
The CAESAR is a wheeled, 155 mm 52-caliber self-propelled howitzer. It holds 18 rounds and is typically operated by a crew of five, though if necessary the CAESAR can be operated by a crew of three. It can be transported by a C-130 or an A400M aircraft. It has a firing range of approximately 42 kilometres (26 mi) using an Extended Range, Full Bore (ERFB) shell, and more than 50 kilometres (31 mi) using rocket-assisted shells. The CAESAR has an autonomous weapon system featuring an inertial navigation system (the SIGMA 30), a ballistic computer and an optional muzzle velocity radar; the system is adaptable to any C4I system (fully integrated with the ATLAS FCS). At Eurosatory 2016, the CAESAR was exhibited with an automated laying system based on the SIGMA 30. Tailored for shoot-and-scoot tactics, the CAESAR is fast to set up, taking around 60 seconds for the crew to be ready to fire and 40 seconds to leave after the shots. It can fire six rounds per minute.

=== CAESAR 8×8 ===
The CAESAR 8×8 uses a modified Tatra 817 8x8 chassis, allowing a higher degree of mobility. It is fitted with an unarmoured forward control four person cabin as standard, with an optional fully-armoured cabin. Gross vehicle weight would depend on the level of armour protection but is about 30 tonnes. It is powered by a 410 hp diesel engine and can hold 36 rounds. It was unveiled by Nexter at DSEI 2015.

=== CAESAR 6×6 Mark II ===
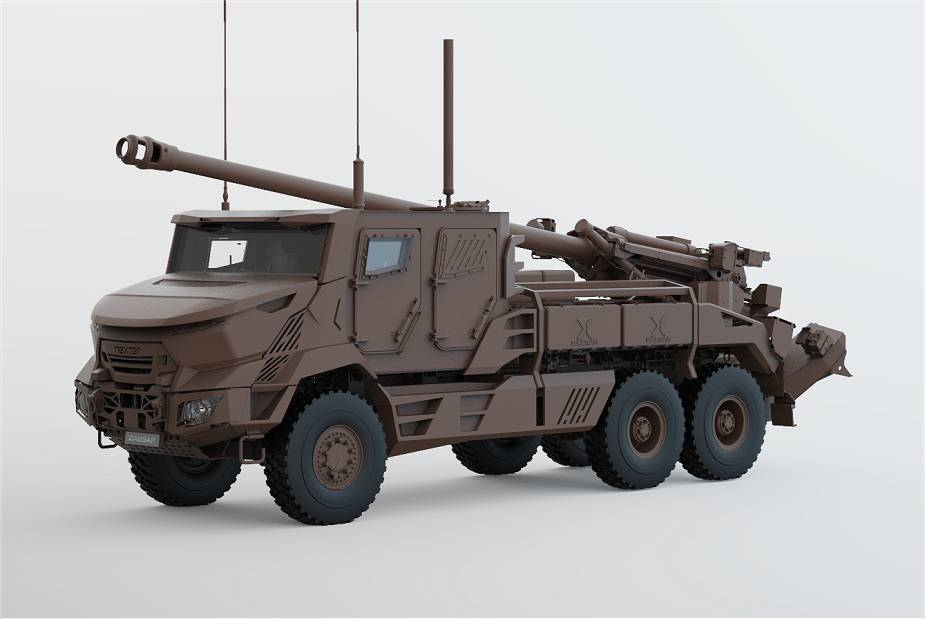
CAESAR NG

In February 2022, Nexter was awarded an initial €600 million contract by the French defence procurement agency (the DGA) for the development and acquisition of the CAESAR 6×6 Mark II new generation artillery system. The deal initiated a four-year development phase, after which the CAESAR Mark II (or CAESAR NG) is planned to enter production. In January 2024, the DGA announced that it had awarded Nexter an additional €350 million contract on 30 December 2023. 109 CAESAR NG systems are to be produced for the French Army. Nexter, the industrial prime contractor, will be working in particular with Arquus (chassis) and Safran (electronics), the main partners involved in the development and implementation of this programme.

From mobility to connectivity, and from ballistic protection to increased firing efficiency, as well as accuracy further refined by an artificial intelligence system developed by Helsing, the improvements remain those set out in 2022 when the program was launched. The CAESAR Mark II will feature a new six-wheel chassis provided by Arquus, a new cabin with improved armor and, this time, four doors for improved agility. The system will also feature a new 460 hp engine, more than twice as powerful as the previous one (215 hp), as well as a new automatic gearbox. It will incorporate a new version of its velocity radar and new fire control software, as well as Safran's Geonyx inertial navigation system to replace the SIGMA 30, which promises enhanced geolocation and pointing accuracy in environments with no GNSS signal. Another differentiating feature is a more powerful hydraulic pump, enabling the stabiliser to be lowered and raised more quickly. This development could, in theory, shave a few precious seconds off engagement and disengagement maneuvers. Finally, the cabin will be predisposed to receive the vetronics of the SCORPION combat information network, such as the NCT-t (noeud de communication tactique - terre) software radio from the CONTACT program and the ECLIPSE anti-IED jammer from Thales, a technology that could be extended to anti-drone warfare, and which Belgium has chosen to integrate natively. The new armored cabin to protect against mines and ballistic projectiles is expected to raise the CAESAR Mark II's weight to 25 tonnes (27.56 tons) but the system will remain air-transportable, an indispensable French requirement.

All 109 units ordered for the French Army are expected to be delivered between 2026 and 2030. Belgium and Lithuania are the first export customers of the new system and have respectively ordered 28 and 48 units.

== Operational deployment ==
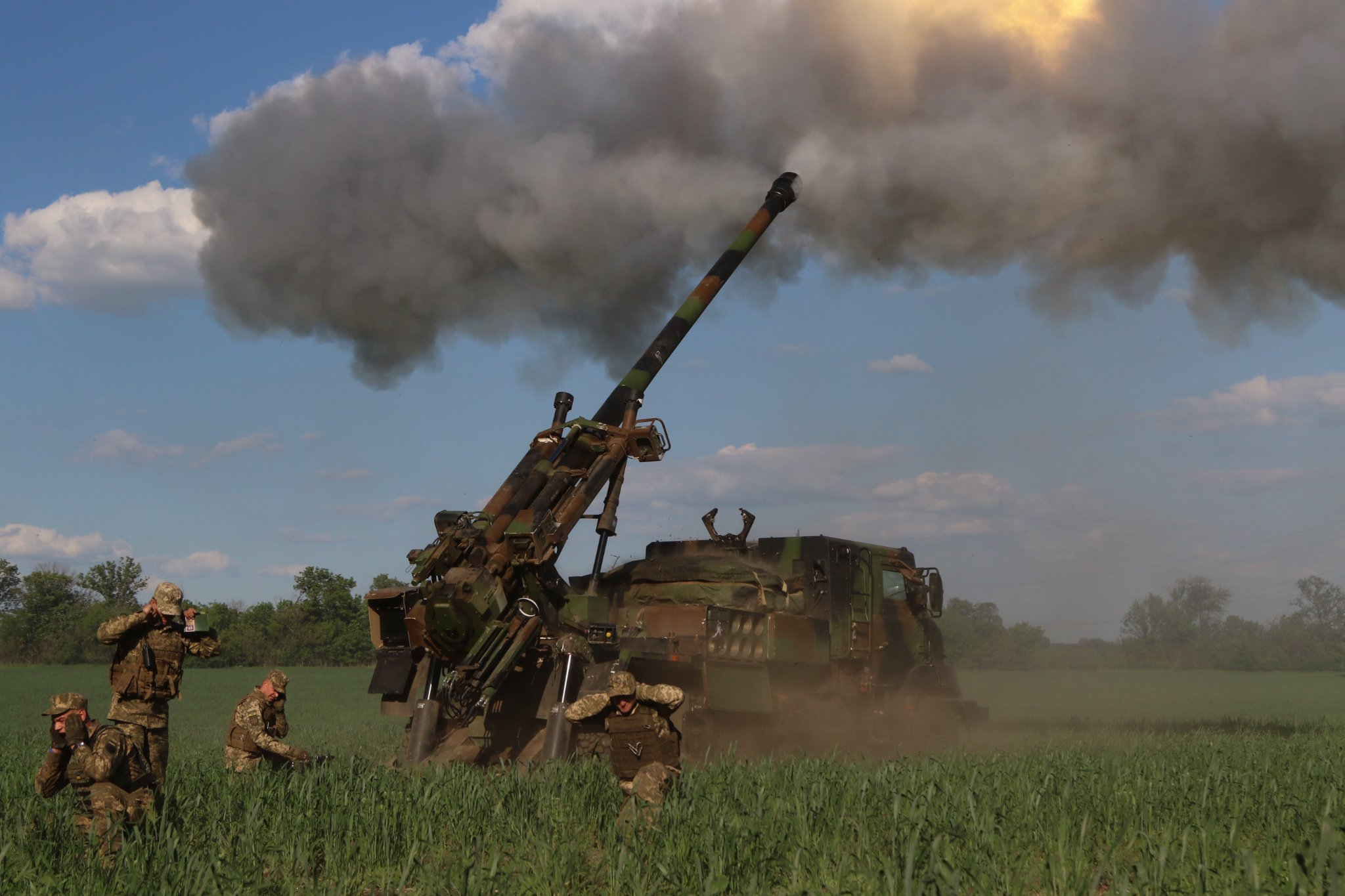
Ukrainian artillerymen using a French-supplied CAESAR during the Russo-Ukrainian War

Eight CAESARs were sent to Afghanistan during the summer of 2009 to support French operations. They were deployed on 1 August 2009 by the 3rd Marine Artillery Regiment (3è RAMa), followed by five others, deployed as a firebase in FOB Tora, Tagab and Nijrab. They were fitted with cabin armor add-ons, with fireports.

The French Army deployed this system in southern Lebanon as part of the UNIFIL peacekeeping force.

During Operation Serval in Mali, four CAESARs were deployed by the 68^{e} régiment d'artillerie d'Afrique (68th African Artillery Regiment).

In April 2011, the Royal Thai Army used the CAESAR against Cambodia's BM-21. The Thai Army claimed that they destroyed two or more BM-21 systems.

Several CAESARs were deployed in Mali by France during Operation Serval, in which they saw action in the Battle of Ifoghas, amongst others. France also deployed four CAESARs to Iraq for the Battle of Mosul, where French forces supported the Iraqi Army's operation to reclaim Mosul from ISIS from October 2016 to July 2017. Multiple CAESARs were deployed to Iraq on the Syrian border from 8 November 2018 to April 2019 to support the Syrian Democratic Forces in the Battle of Baghuz Fawqani, the ultimately successful operation to capture the final town held by the Islamic State group. They were deployed to Firebase Saham, a base freshly constructed by the United States Army to provide fire support during the battle, especially during cloudy days when U.S. aircraft could not see to conduct airstrikes.

CAESAR howitzers may have been used by the Saudi Arabia National Guard during the Saudi-led intervention in Yemen along the Saudi-Yemeni frontier, conducting defensive shelling of Houthi forces as well as backing up Yemeni government troops and Saudi armed forces in their progression into Yemeni territory.

France provided the CAESAR 6×6 cannon to Ukraine from May 2022 onwards in the context of the Russo-Ukrainian War, delivering a total of 30 units. Denmark also announced that it had delivered all 19 of its CAESAR 8×8 howitzers to Ukraine by the end of April 2023. As of February 2025, 7 CAESARs were confirmed to have been destroyed (6 CAESAR 6×6 and 1 CAESAR 8×8) and a further 3 damaged.

== Operators ==
Operators	Order date	Orders		Deliveries				Donations [+ / -]	Known losses [-]	Quantity in service	Sources
Operators	Order date	Caesar (Mk1)	Caesar (Mk2)	Mk1 - Sherpa 5 (6×6)	Mk1 - Unimog U2450L (6×6)	Mk1 - Tatra 817 (8×8)	Mk2 - Armis (6×6)	Donations [+ / -]	Known losses [-]	Quantity in service	Sources
Armenia	Jun 2024	36	–	2 (+ 34)	–	–	–	–	–	2	
Belgium	May 2022	–	9	–	–	–	0 (+ 28)	–	–	0	Delivery planned from 2027.
Belgium	Feb 2024	–	19	–	–	–	0 (+ 28)	–	–	0	Delivery planned from 2027.
Croatia	Dec 2025	–	18	–	–	–	0 (+ 18)	–	–	0	Delivery planned from mid-2029.
Czech Republic	Sep 2021	52	–	–	–	0 (+ 62)	–	–	–	0	Delivery delayed.
Czech Republic	Dec 2022	10	–	–	–	0 (+ 62)	–	–	–	0	Delivery delayed.
(Danish Realm) Denmark	May 2017	15	–	–	–	19	–	19	–	0	Decision to donate the Caesar to Ukraine in January 2023.
(Danish Realm) Denmark	Oct 2019	4	–	–	–	19	–	19	–	0	Decision to donate the Caesar to Ukraine in January 2023.
Estonia	Jun 2024	12	–	12 (+ 12)	–	–	–	–	–	12	12 delivered as of August 2025. Delivery of last 12 expected in 2026.
Estonia	Feb 2026	12	–	12 (+ 12)	–	–	–	–	–	12	12 delivered as of August 2025. Delivery of last 12 expected in 2026.
France	2000	5	–	107	–	–	–	30	1	76	
France	Dec 2004	72	–	107	–	–	–	30	1	76	
France	Jul 2022	18	–	107	–	–	–	30	1	76	
France	Dec 2023	12	–	107	–	–	–	30	1	76	
France	Jan 2024	–	109	–	–	–	0 (+ 109)	–	–	0	Delivery planned from 2026.
Indonesia	Nov 2012	37	–	55	–	–	–	–	–	55	LOI for additional Caesar signed in 2025.
Indonesia	Feb 2017	18	–	55	–	–	–	–	–	55	LOI for additional Caesar signed in 2025.
Lithuania	Dec 2022	–	18	–	–	–	0 (+ 48)	–	–	0	Delivery planned from 2027.
Lithuania	10 Dec 2025	–	30	–	–	–	0 (+ 48)	–	–	0	Delivery planned from 2027.
Malaysia	Jun 2026	18	–	0 (+ 18)	–	–	–	–	–	0	
Morocco	Jan 2020	36	–	36	–	–	–	–	–	36	
Portugal	Oct 2024	–	36	–	–	–	0 (+ 36)	–	–	0	Delivery planned by 2034.
Saudi Arabia	2006 / Jan 2007	80	–	–	156	–	–	–	–	156	
Saudi Arabia	2009	20	–	–	156	–	–	–	–	156	
Saudi Arabia	2011	32	–	–	156	–	–	–	–	156	
Saudi Arabia	2018	24	–	–	156	–	–	–	–	156	
Slovenia	Jun 2025	–	12	–	–	–	0 (+ 12)	–	–	0	Delivery planned by 2028.
Thailand	May 2006	6	–	6	–	–	–	–	–	6	
Ukraine	May 2022 - French donation 6×6 a	–	–	–	–	–	–	+ 12	9	120	
Ukraine	Feb 2023; French donation 6×6	–	–	–	–	–	–	+ 18	9	120	
Ukraine	2023; Danish donation 8×8	–	–	–	–	–	–	+ 19	1	120	
Ukraine	Total orders for Ukraine	≥81	–	81	–	–	–	–	–	120	
Sub-total		600	251	299	156	19	0	–	11	463	
Total		851		474				–	11	463	

To be produced and delivered
Transfer for Ukraine
- The Danish Army didn't use the CAESAR operationally before its transfer to Ukraine

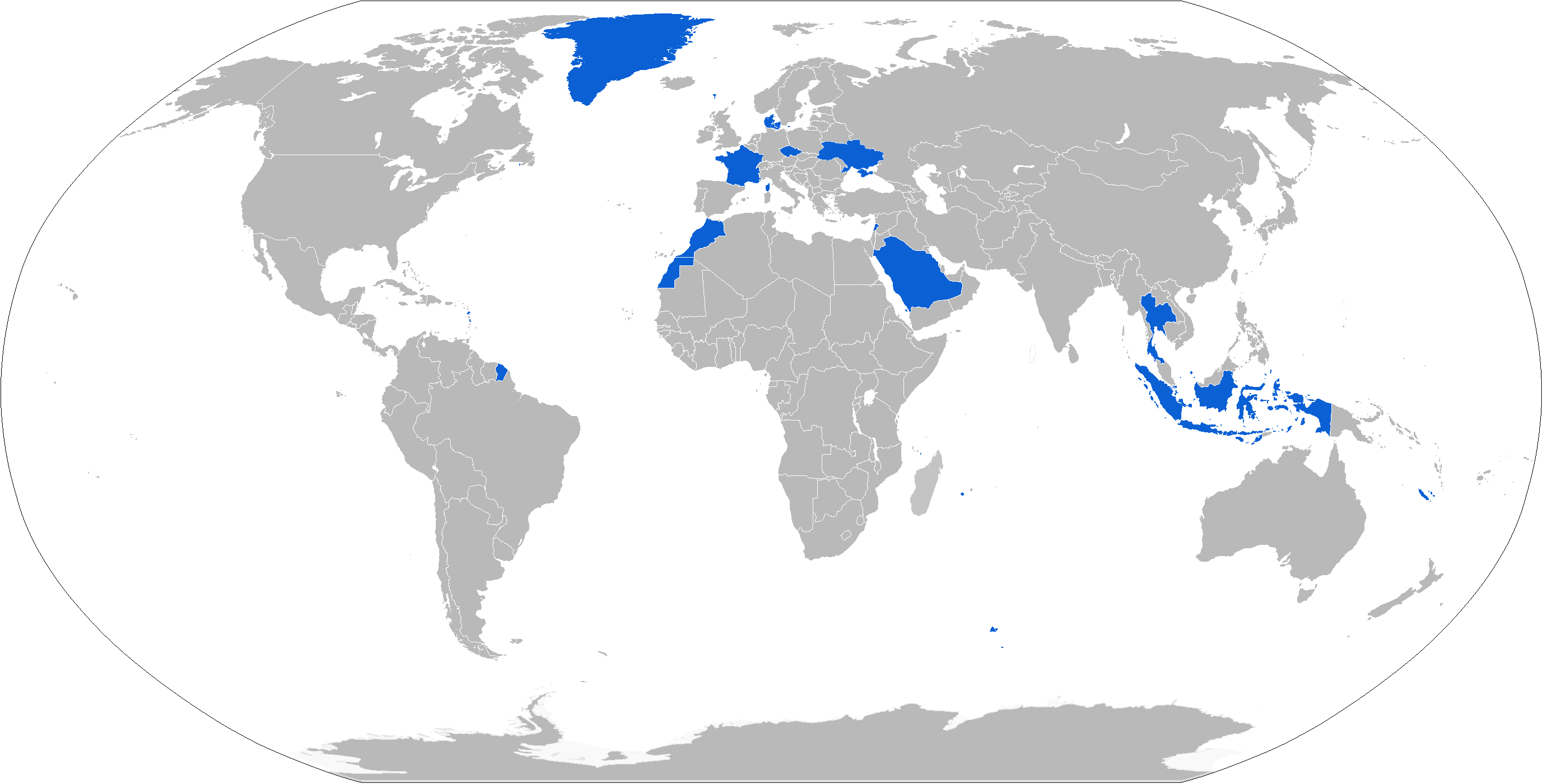
Map of CAESAR operators in blue

=== Current operators ===
- - Armenian Armed Forces: Alongside the Eurosatory 2024 Exhibition, the Defence Ministry of Armenia and the KNDS defence company signed a military-technical agreement. A day later, the French defence minister Sébastien Lecornu announced the signing of a contract with Armenia for the acquisition of CAESAR Mk1 cannons. With the sale to Croatia and Estonia, the total reached 60 systems, meaning 36 for Armenia. CAESAR was seen on 11 May 2026 during parade rehearsals.
- - Estonian Land Forces: On 19 June 2024, Estonia ordered 12 French made CAESAR Mk1 cannons. The agreement has an option to buy additional units. The first batch of six units was delivered in January 2025 Last year, the Estonian Defence Forces received the first 12 CAESAR MK1 155 millimetre self-propelled howitzers. Additional 12 units were procured in early 2026, bringing the total number to 24 by year's end.
- (France) - French Army: The first order (for 5 cannons) was placed on 20 September 2000. The first five units were delivered in 2003. Following the evaluation, the main order of 72 CAESAR 6×6 cannons was made in late 2004. In July 2008, the first cannon of the first batch of eight units was delivered to the French Army.
- (Indonesia) - Indonesian Army: The Indonesian Army acquired 37 CAESAR units for $240 million, the first two arriving in mid-September 2012. Another 18 were purchased in a follow-up order signed in February 2017.
- - Royal Moroccan Army: In January 2020, Morocco agreed to purchase CAESAR 6×6 howitzers, at a total cost of €170 million for the artillery pieces and €30 million for the ammunition. In early September 2022, the Royal Moroccan Artillery received 36 of up to 60 systems available to order under this contract.
- - Saudi Arabian National Guard: In 2006, GIAT announced a 76 unit sale plus a 4 unit option to an unspecified foreign customer, later confirmed to be Saudi Arabia. The 4 optional units became firm sales in January 2007, with the first two units to be assembled in France and the other 78 in Saudi Arabia. In March 2010, the Saudi Arabian National Guard (SANG) was delivered its first four units. All 80 units were delivered by 2018.
- (Thailand) - Royal Thai Army: 6 CAESAR mounted on Sherpa 6×6 truck chassis were ordered in 2006 and have been operated by the Royal Thai Army (RTA) since 2010.
- - Ukrainian Ground Forces: In response to the 2022 Russian invasion of Ukraine, France and Denmark provided Ukraine with several CAESAR guns. As of October 2025, KNDS France reports that 120 CAESAR Mk1 (6×6 and 8×8) systems are currently deployed in Ukraine.
  - Donations:
    - 12 announced by France in April 2022, seen on the field from May 2022 (CAESAR Mk1 6×6)
    - 6 announced by France in June 2022, delivered by July 2022 (CAESAR Mk1 6×6)
    - 12 announced by France in January 2023 (CAESAR Mk1 6×6)
    - 19 announced by Denmark in January 2023, all delivered by 28 April 2023 (CAESAR Mk1 8×8)
  - CAESAR coalition for Ukraine: At the launch, on 18 January 2024, of the Artillery Coalition led by France and the United States to support the Ukrainian war effort. The intent is to produce 78 units for Ukraine in 2024.
    - Orders:
      - Ukraine orders:
        - 6 CAESAR
      - French orders:
        - 12 CAESAR ordered in January 2024
        - 12 CAESAR ordered in June 2024
      - The other 22 members of the coalition are expected to each contribute financing some of the CAESAR
        - No order yet.
    - Known deliveries:
      - 6 delivered to Ukraine

=== Future deliveries ===
- - Belgian Army: Following the acquisition of the Griffon and Jaguar within the CaMo-program, Belgium decided in 2021 to order 9 CAESAR NG 6×6 cannons in a contract of approximately €48 million. In June 2022 a €62 million contract was signed for an additional 19 CAESAR NG. Delivery of the first units is expected in 2027.
- (Croatia) - Croatian Army: Framework agreement signed at Eurosatory 2024 with France, without an obligation to purchase it in the Mk2 variant. Budget approved for the purchase of 18 systems in October 2025. The contract was signed in December 2025.
- (Czech Republic) - Czech Land Forces: In June 2020, Nexter won a €200 million contract to provide the CAESAR 8×8 to the Czech Army. 52 systems integrated on the Czech Tatra 815–7T3RC1 8×8 chassis were ordered. 10 additional units were ordered in December 2022.
- (France) - French Army: 109 CAESAR NG are on order for the French Army and will be delivered from 2026 onwards.
- - Lithuanian Land Forces: In June 2022 Lithuania joined the CAESAR NG (Mk2) program with an order for 18 units, with first deliveries expected in 2027. On 10 December 2025, Lithuania has signed a contract for a second batch of 30 CAESAR NG (Mk2), which will be delivered by 2030.
- (Malaysia) - Malaysian Army: Offered by KNDS in May 2024, and to be assembled and integrated in the industrial facilities of Advanced Defence Systems Sdn. Bhd. (ADSSB) in Segamat.
- - Portuguese Army: The new Military Programming Law signed in 2023 provides funds for the acquisition of a 155 mm 8×8 self-propelled artillery system to replace the current M114A1 155 mm howitzers. It was mentioned on CNN Portugal that the CAESAR would be the most likely cannon of this type to equip the Army. Portugal confirmed an initial order for two batteries (twelve units) of SPW 155 6×6 growing to a maximum of 36 units. As of November 2025, it is confirmed that the Land Force 2045 programme includes the purchase of 36 CAESAR Mk2, 18 to replace the M114A1 and 18 to replace the M119 LG.
- (Slovenia) - Slovenian Army: In July 2024, the Slovenian MoD signed a Letter of Intent with the French MoD on the European joint procurement of CAESAR artillery systems. In June 2025, the Ministry of Defence confirmed the order for 12 systems, which will be delivered by 2028. An additional 6 systems will be ordered and delivered by 2030. This will bring the Slovenian Armed Forces to a total of 18 Mk2 systems.

=== Potential operators ===
- (Brazil) - Brazilian Army: On 30 October 2024, the Brazilian media reported that France's President Emmanuel Macron during his trip to Rio de Janeiro to participate the 2024 G20 summit will offer to the Brazilian President Luiz Inácio Lula da Silva a package of armaments, including the 36 CAESAR. The offer comes as the ATMOS 2000 of Elbit Systems that was selected in 2024 is with contract signing on hold as a result of diplomatic tensions over the Gaza war and Israel–Hezbollah conflict.
- - Bulgarian Land Forces: The Bulgarian Minister of Defence, Atanas Zapryanov confirmed that Bulgaria has intent to join in a joint procurement program for CAESAR artillery systems. Bulgaria plans to purchase 57 systems The purchase was approved by Bulgarian parliament in November 2026.
- (Finland) - Finnish Navy: 12 to 20 mobile artillery systems tender launched to replace the 15 Appellate 130 53 TK 130 mm for coastal protection mission.The competitors are the Mk2 variant and the Archer.
- - Iraqi Army: The Commander of the Iraqi Ground Forces expressed interest to purchase the CAESAR artillery system in 2022. The system had been previously deployed in the country by French troops to support Iraq in key battles against Islamic State.
- (Philippines) - Philippine Army: Procurement of additional ATMOS 2000 was initially planned. However, delays on existing defence procurement contracts from Israel that are partly attributable to Gaza War, and Israel’s neutral stance regarding Philippine claims in the West Philippine Sea, have prompted a review of alternative self-propelled howitzers. As a result, the CAESAR and DITA were shortlisted for potential acquisition.

=== Former operators ===
- - Royal Danish Army: On 14 March 2017 the CAESAR 8×8 was chosen to become the new artillery system of the Royal Danish Army. 15 cannons were ordered in May 2017 and an additional 4 in October 2019 for a total of 19 CAESAR units. Delivery of the first 15 units was expected to take place by summer 2020 but the COVID pandemic led to the delivery of a first batch being delayed to spring 2021, with delivery of all 19 units expected in 2023. However, following discussions with France, Denmark decided on 19 January 2023 to donate all systems to Ukraine in the context of the 2022 Russian invasion. The capability gap that arose from this decision led to a new bid for which Nexter, once again, and Israel's Soltam Systems competed. Denmark opted for the ATMOS 2000 system over the CAESAR, with the production backlog of the CAESAR and Soltam's ability to quickly deliver the howitzers being cited among the reasons for said choice. Denmark's interest in purchasing 8 PULS rocket artillery systems from Elbit Systems as well as the fact that it already operated the Cardom 120 mm self-propelled mortar, which is produced by Soltam as well, had reportedly also favored the acquisition of the ATMOS as it meant having a sole supplier (Israel) for the artillery segment.

=== Failed bids ===
- - Brazilian Army: The CAESAR was offered to the Brazilian Army as part of the "VBCOAP 155mm SR" program for the acquisition of 36 self-propelled guns. Among the competitors are the Brazilian project "Sistema de Artillería 155mm/52 AP SR Tupã" by Avibras Aeroespacial, potentially the Artillery Gun Module by KMW (derived from the PzH2000) The other, and main competitor is the ATMOS 2000 presented by Elbit Systems. Elbit is a strong competitor as it has subsidiaries in Brazil (ARES Aerospacial e Defesa and AEL Sistemas) which would guarantee the logistical support and a technology transfer. The ATMOS 2000 won the competition in April 2024.
- - National Army of Colombia: The CAESAR was one of the competitors of the program "Soberana", intended to provide the future 155 mm artillery system. The other competitors were the ATMOS 2000 and the Turkish Yavuz SPh 6×6 by MKE. On 1 January 2023, Indodefensa announced that the Colombian Army favored the French system and that the government was about to notify the contract for the CAESAR 6x6 to Nexter for US$101.7 million. However, on 3 January 2023, Colombia announced the order of 18 ATMOS 2000 for US$101.7 million. It was reported the value of the CAESAR contract notified by Nexter exceeded the budget allocated to the program, leading to the negotiations falling through and Colombia choosing the ATMOS instead.
- - Norwegian Army: In January 2016, Norway had shortlisted CAESAR, the K9 Thunder, the PzH 2000 and a modernised version of the M109 Paladin proposed by Switzerland's RUAG to replace the 18 M109A3GN self-propelled guns in service with the Norwegian Armed forces. The K9 was selected for purchase in December 2017.
- - British Army: The army was looking for a replacement for the AS-90 tracked self-propelled howitzers by 2032 (under a project named Mobile Fire Platform). All types of self-propelled howitzers were being considered. 116 units are to be acquired. The UK had already acquired 14 Archer Artillery Systems as a short-term solution to replace the 30 AS-90 transferred to Ukraine. The 8×8 Archer variant is offered as part of the MFP program. Other prominent bidders included Hanwha Aerospace with its K9 Thunder and KNDS (Nexter and KMW) with the 8×8 CAESAR and the RCH 155. In April 2024, the United Kingdom selected the RCH 155.

=== Evaluation only ===
- - Indian Army: The army is looking to modernise its artillery. The Field Artillery Rationalisation Plan defined in 2021 the way to be followed, focusing on the Made in India. The Indian Army is expecting 814 truck-mounted guns (MGS program = mounted gun system). An RFI was issued on 3 April 2021, with the intent to acquire a truck-mounted howitzer capable of being deployed in deserts, high altitude and mountainous terrains. CAESAR was offered in 2014 as part of a collaboration between Nexter Systems and Larsen & Toubro. The system is mounted on an Ashok Leyland Super Stallion 6×6. India was initially interested in an MGS, 200 that would be ordered off-shelf, and later 614 manufactured locally. The tender initially opened to foreign bidders was, however, scrapped for the sake of the Make in India initiative, favoring local designs.
- - United States Army & United States Marine Corps: The Army was interested in a mobile platform. Some "Mobile Howitzer Trials and Shoot-Off" had been occurring in 2021. The systems tested were the CAESAR, the ATMOS 2000, the Archer and the Nora B-52. The Army was very positive with the CAESAR, but ultimately did not move forward with acquiring a wheeled howitzer system.

== Gallery ==
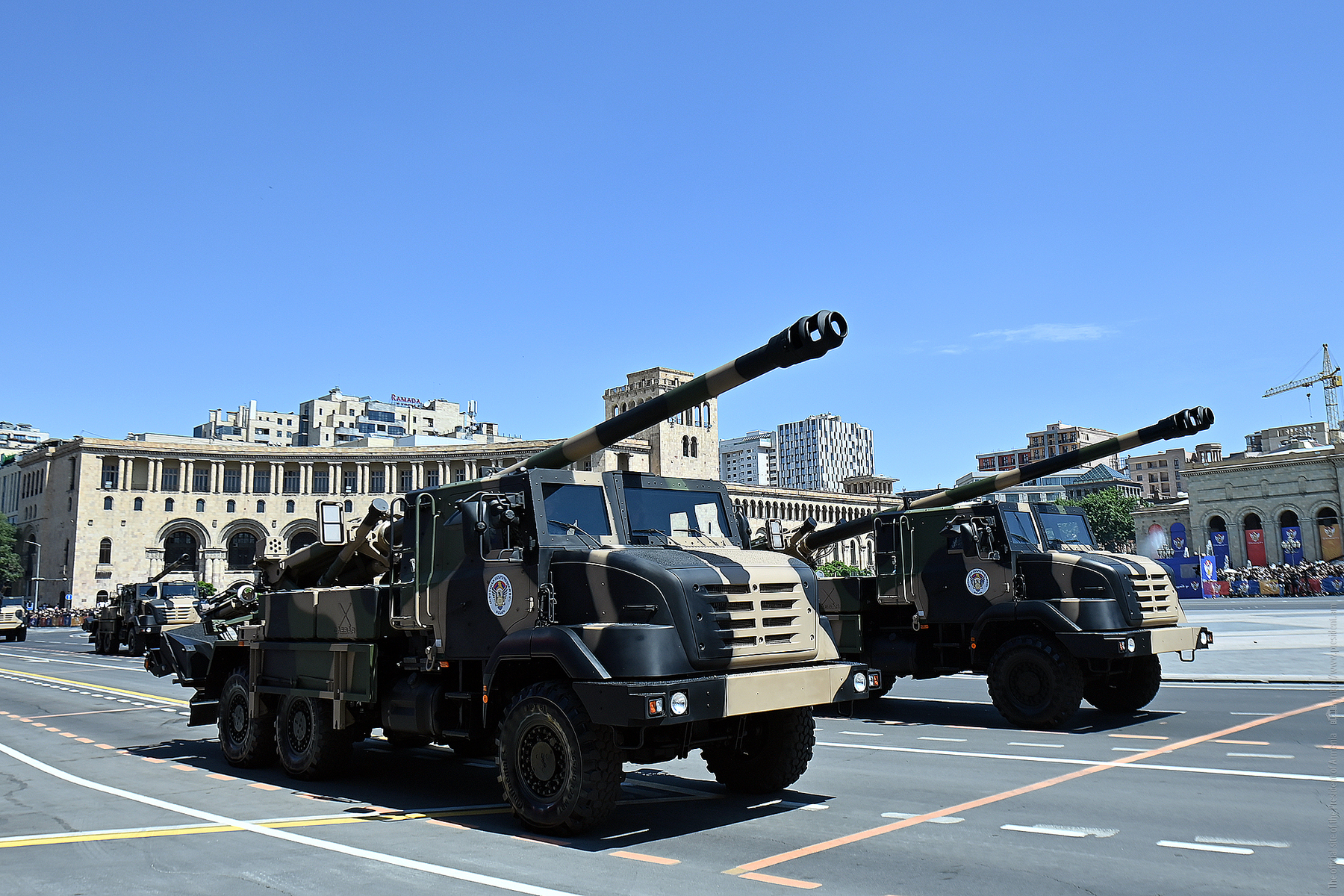
Armenian CAESAR during parade in Yerevan

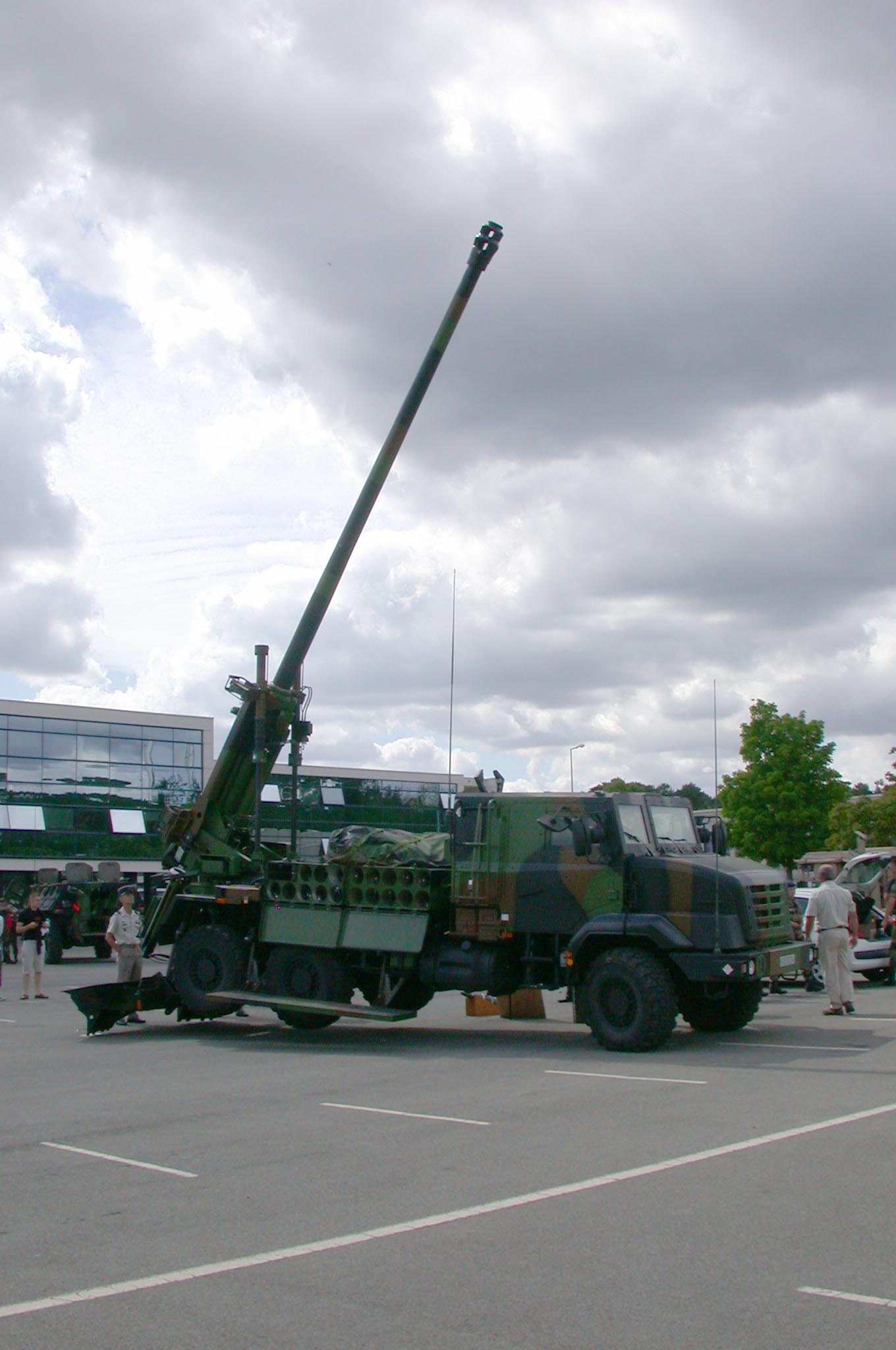
On display, side profile of deployed howitzer

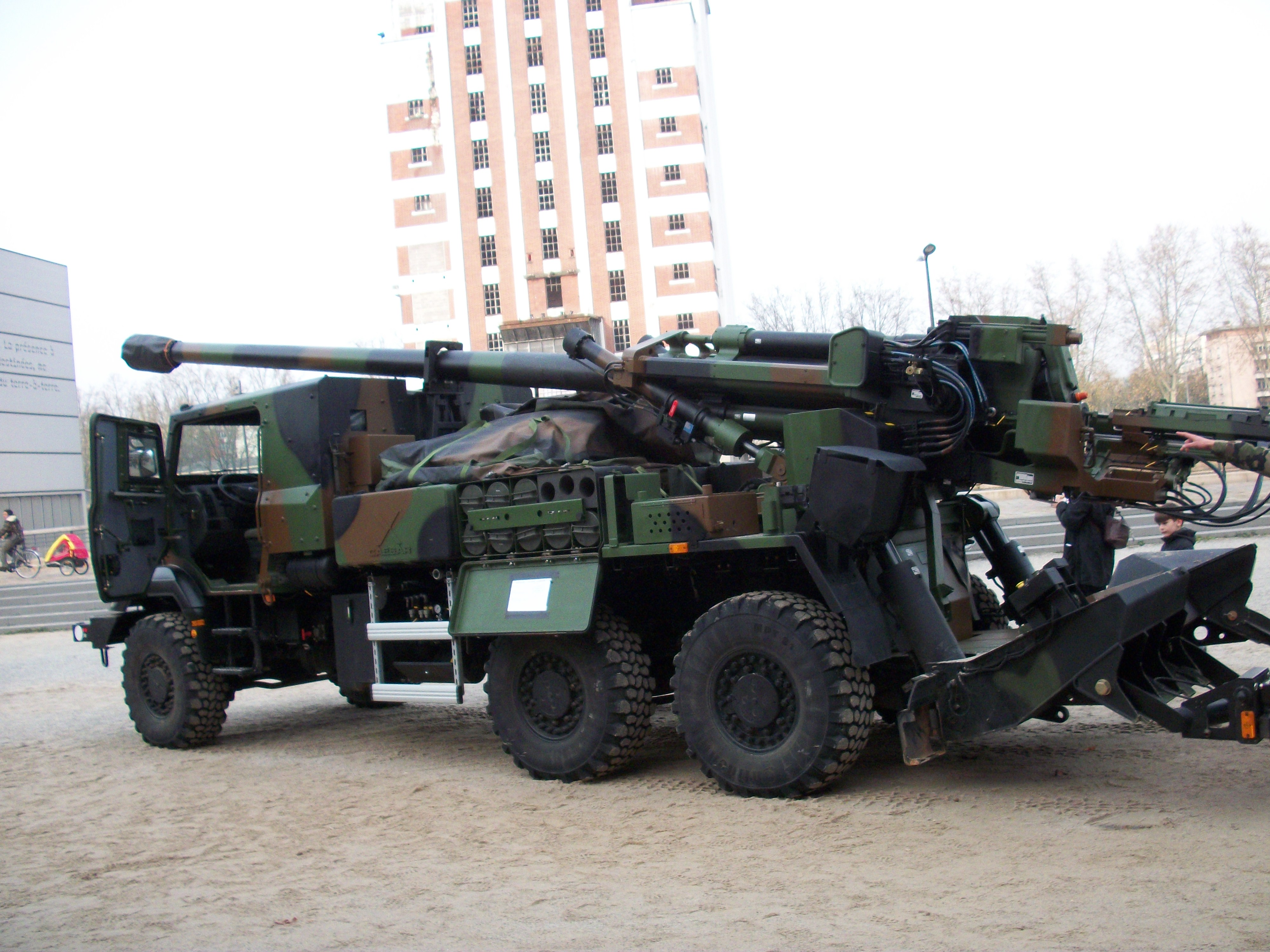
On display, close up of system

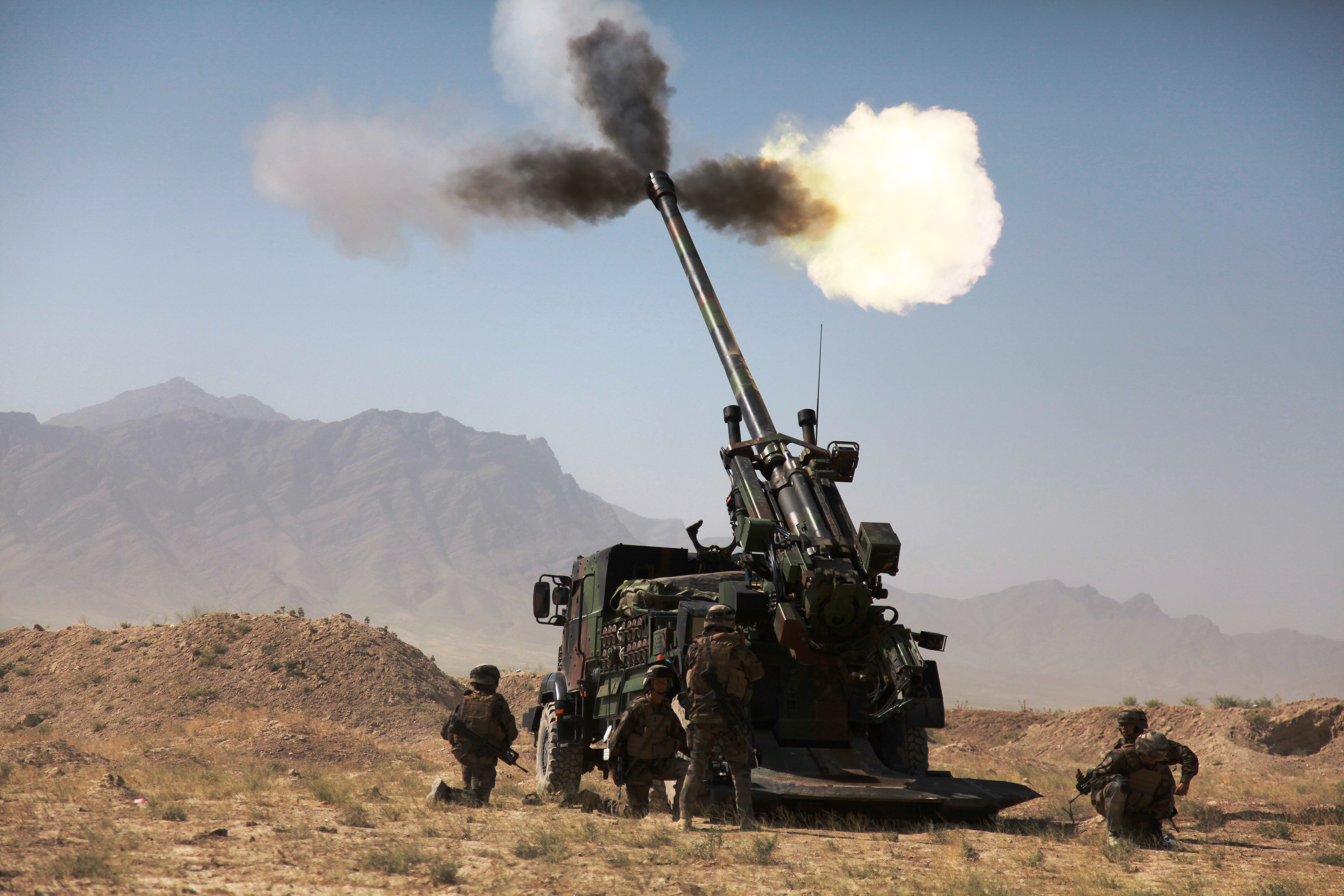
Live fire in Afghanistan, August 2009

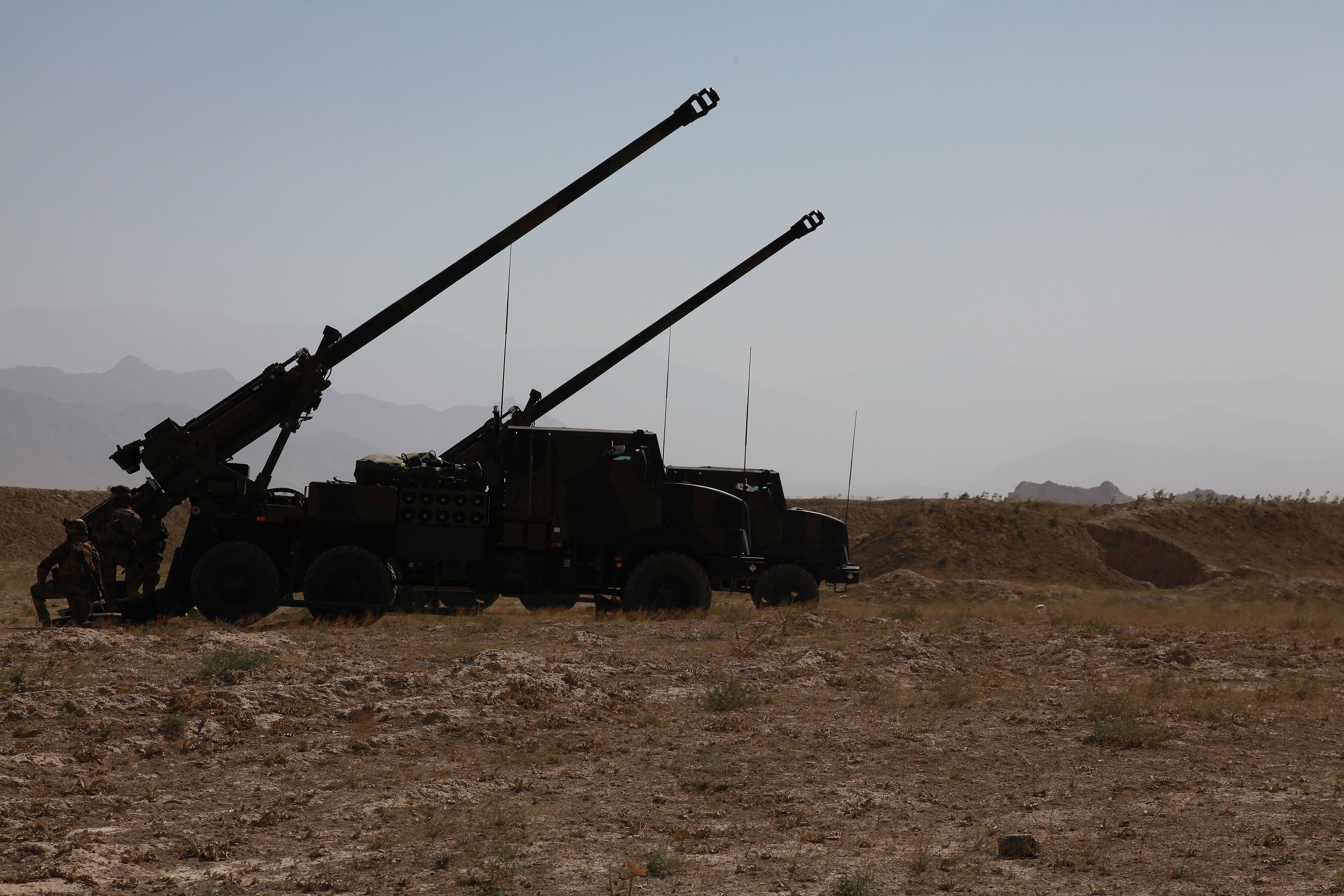
CAESAR gun line in Afghanistan, August 2009

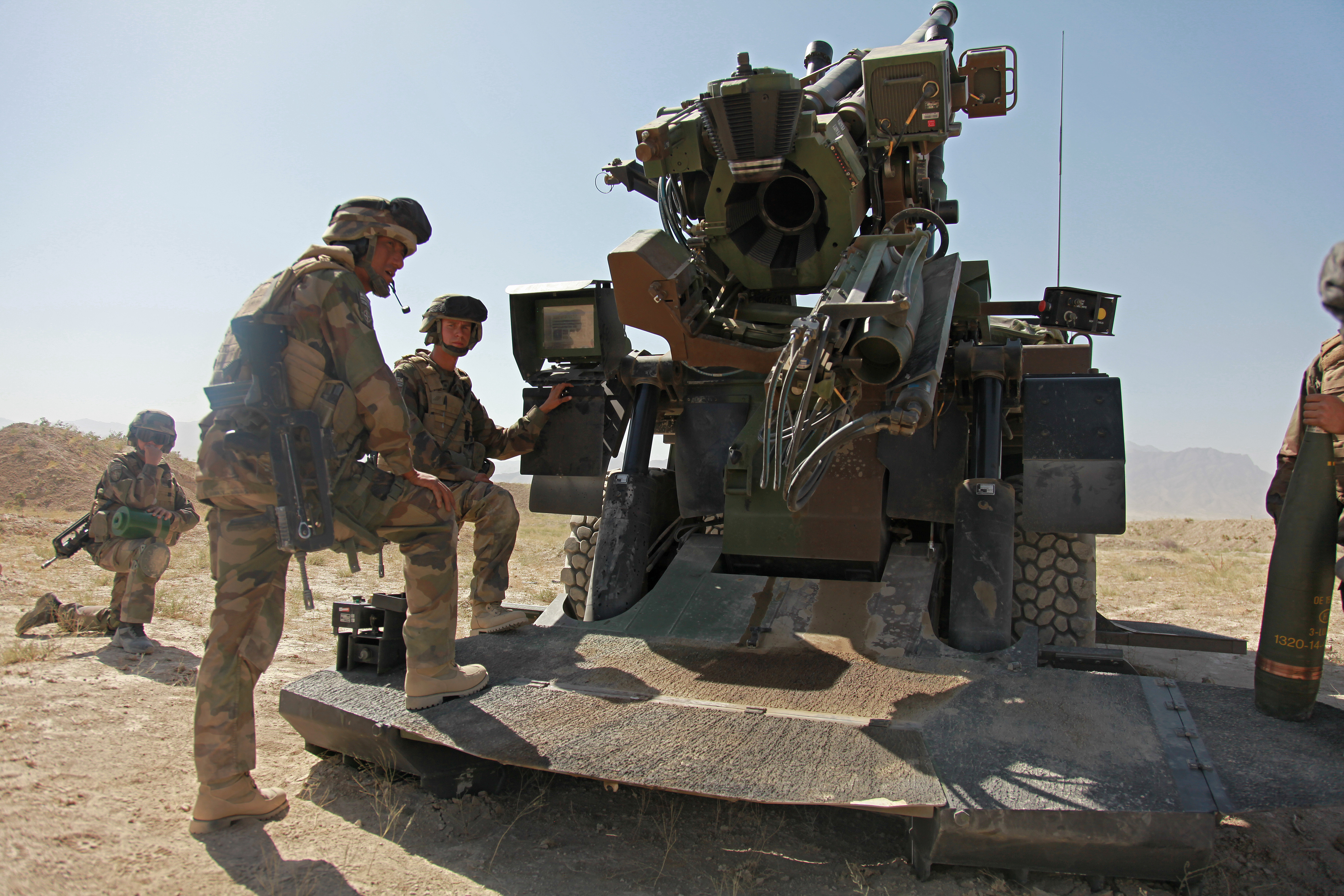
Preparing to load the breech in Afghanistan, August 2009

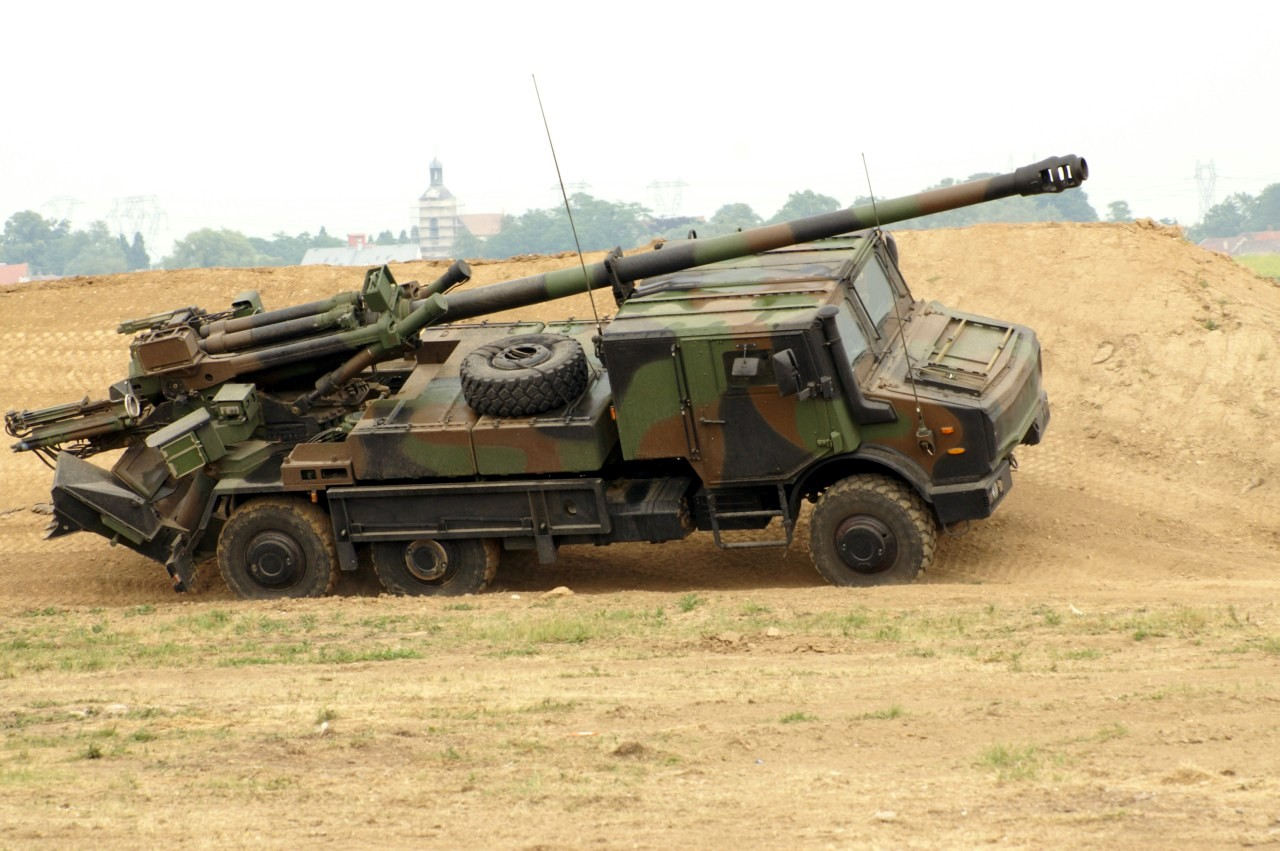
CAESAR howitzer on a Unimog U2450L 6×6 chassis

== See also ==
- Archer – (Sweden)
- 2S19 Msta-S – (Soviet Union, Russia)
- 2S35 Koalitsiya-SV – (Russia)
- ATMOS 2000 – (Israel)
- 2S43 Malva – (Russia)
- A-222 Bereg – (Russia)
- 2S22 Bohdana – (Ukraine)
- 152 mm SpGH DANA – (Czechoslovakia)
- G6 howitzer – (South Africa)
- AHS Kryl – (Poland)
- Nora B-52 – (Serbia)
- PCL-09 – (China)
- PCL-161 – (China)
- PCL-181 – (China)
- PLL-09 – (China)
- Type 19 155 mm wheeled self-propelled howitzer – (Japan)
- 155 mm SpGH Zuzana – (Slovakia)
- RCH 155 – (Germany)
- MaRG 155-BR

Other French artillery

- MEPAC, self-propelled mortar carrier
