= FR1 =

FR1 or FR-1 may refer to:

- FR-1 or Ryan FR Fireball, an American mixed-power fighter aircraft
- FR1 (Lazio regional railways) or FL1, an Italian railway line
- FR-1 (satellite), a French satellite
- Renault FR1, a model of coach bus
- 12002 Suess or 1996 FR_{1}, an asteroid
- Waterdeep and the North's product code
- FR1, a 5G NR radio frequency band

== See also ==
- FR F1, a French sniper rifle
