= Société de Véhicules Automobiles de Batilly =

Société de Véhicules Automobiles de Batilly SNC
- Type: Subsidiary
- Industry: Automotive
- Founded: 1 July 1980
- Headquarters: Batilly, France
- Key people: Javier Novo (Director)
- Products: Master IV
- Production output: 126,461 (2015)
- Parent: Renault
- Website: www.sovab-renault-batilly.fr

Batilly factory
- Built: 1979
- Location: SOVAB Batilly, Zone industrielle, BP 2, 54980 Batilly, France
- Coordinates: 49.173306°N 5.978394°E
- Employees: 2,141 (February 2017)
- Area: 101 ha (250 acres)
- Volume: 2,5 million

The Société de Véhicules Automobiles de Batilly (French pronunciation: [sɔsjete də vɛikyl otɔmɔbil də batiji]) (SoVAB) is a subsidiary of the French car manufacturer Renault, created in 1980 to operate the light commercial vehicle plant located at Batilly.

== History ==
The project to create a new facility at Batilly, Meurthe-et-Moselle, was begun by Renault's subsidiary Saviem in 1972. It was continued when Saviem was merged with Berliet to form Renault Véhicules Industriels (RVI). The factory was constructed between 1976 and 1979. In 1980 Renault took from its subsidiary RVI a 25% stake of the factory's capital to form SOVAB. At the same year the factory started to manufacture the first-generation Master. The first-generation Trafic was introduced in 1981 and the Renault B in 1982. During the following years Renault collaborated with General Motors and in 1997, they launched the Master II which was also marketed as Opel Movano. From 1995 onwards the Batilly factory became the sole assembler of the Trafic I and its German clone the Opel/Vauxhall Arena, after Chausson's Creil factory was closed down. The model was discontinued in 2000. Renault kept Batilly when sold RVI to Volvo in 2001. In 2010 was introduced the Master III.

== Facilities ==
The SOVAB complex comprises 101 hectares of which 181,838 m^{2} are covered. There is a single production line. The vehicles assembled by the company are sold by Renault, Opel, Vauxhall, Nissan and Renault Trucks. On 13 June 2013, SoVAB produced its 2,000,000th unit.

Within SOVAB there is also a Renault Tech workshop which has 6,800 m^{2} and employs 72 people.

== Current Vehicles manufactured ==
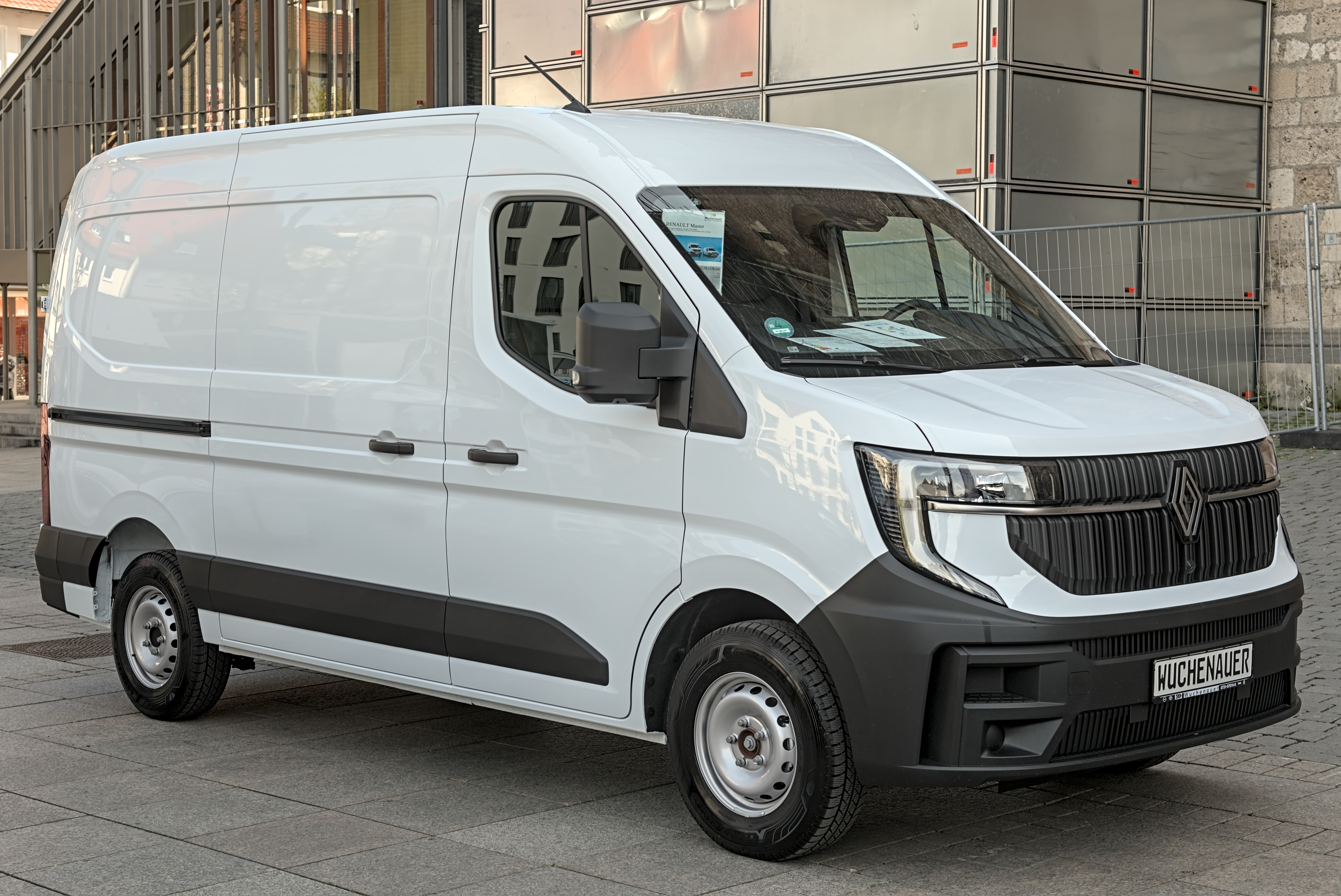
Renault Master IV on the Batilly plant production line.

- Renault Master IV (2024−present)

== Former Vehicles manufactured ==
- Renault Master/Renault Trucks B series/Renault Trucks Messenger (1980−1997)
- Renault Trafic (1981−2000)
- Renault Master II/Renault Trucks Mascott (1997−2010)
- Renault Master III (2010−2024)
