= Renault Sherpa 5 =

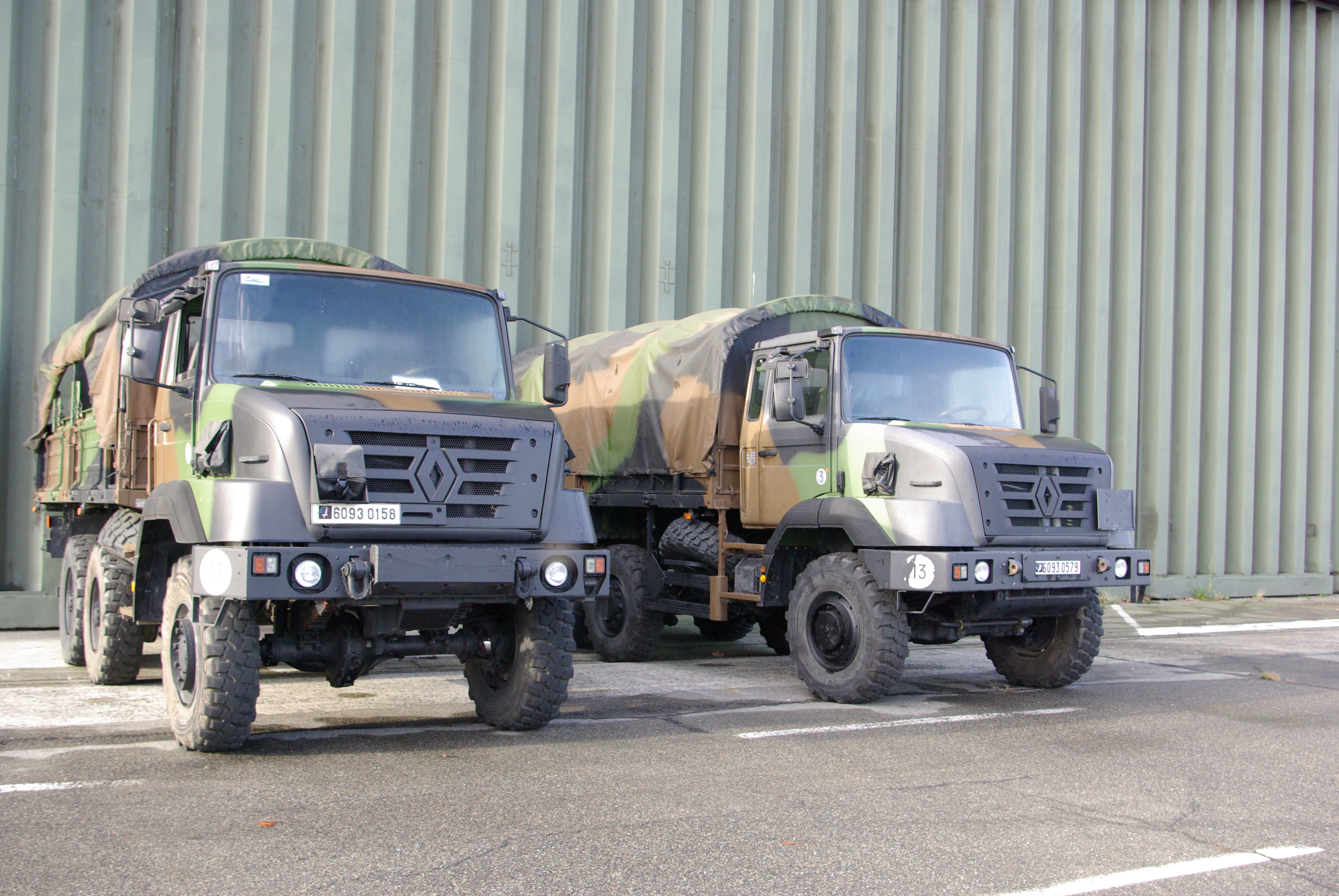
- Type: Tactical military truck
- Place of origin: France

Service history
- In service: 2000s
- Used by: French Army

Production history
- Manufacturer: Renault Trucks
- Produced: 2004 to Present

Specifications
- Mass: 14.2 t
- Length: 7.32 m
- Width: ~2.5 m
- Height: ~3 m
- Crew: 2 + 15
- Engine: Renault 6 cylinder diesel 240 hp
- Operational range: 850 km
- Maximum speed: 88 km/h

The Renault Sherpa 5 is a tactical military truck made by Renault Trucks subsidiary Renault Trucks Defense, renamed Arquus in 2018. It evolved from the Renault GBC 180.

== Description ==
The Sherpa 5 debuted at the 2004 Eurosatory military trade fair. The vehicle is an all-wheel drive truck (in 4×4 or 6×6 configurations) that can carry a payload of seven tons. It is used in military transport roles, such as the base chassis for the CAESAR self-propelled howitzer.
