= Batilly, Meurthe-et-Moselle =

Batilly
- Commune
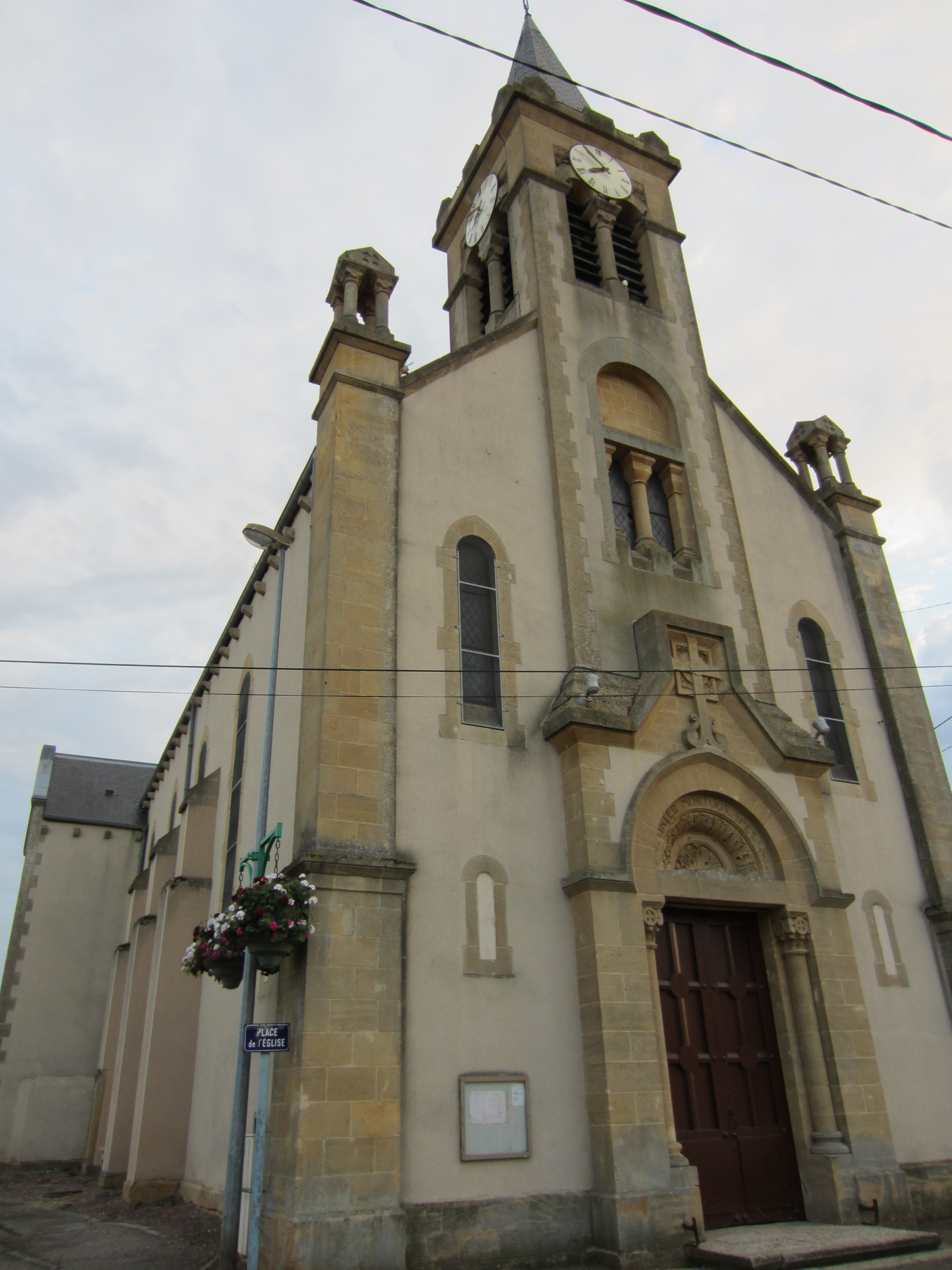
- The church in Batilly

- Coat of arms
- Location of Batilly
- Location within France Location within Grand Est
- Coordinates: 49°10′25″N 5°58′05″E
- Country: France
- Region: Grand Est
- Department: Meurthe-et-Moselle
- Arrondissement: Val-de-Briey
- Canton: Jarny

Government
  - Mayor (2020–2026): Marie-Christine Riggi
- Area^{1}: 6.37 km^{2} (2.46 sq mi)
- Elevation: 245 m (804 ft)
- Highest elevation: 302 m (991 ft)
- Lowest elevation: 208 m (682 ft)
- Population (2023): 1,313
  - Density: 206/km^{2} (534/sq mi)
- Time zone: UTC+01:00 (CET)
  - Summer (DST): UTC+02:00 (CEST)
- INSEE/Postal code: 54051 /54980
- ^{1} French Land Register data, which excludes lakes, ponds, glaciers > 1 km^{2} (0.386 sq mi or 247 acres) and river estuaries.

Batilly (French pronunciation: [batiji]) is a commune in the Meurthe-et-Moselle department in northeastern France.

== Population ==
Historical population
Year	Pop.	±% p.a.
1968	1,042	—
1975	1,012	−0.42%
1982	1,090	+1.07%
1990	1,096	+0.07%
1999	1,130	+0.34%
2007	1,305	+1.82%
2012	1,229	−1.19%
2017	1,261	+0.52%
2023	1,313	+0.68%
Source: INSEE

== SOVAB ==
Batilly is home to Société de Véhicules Automobiles de Batilly (SOVAB), which is a major automotive factory. The Renault Master is produced here, as well as badge engineered versions by Opel, Nissan and Vauxhall. Providing 2,700 jobs, the factory is a major centre of employment in the region.

== See also ==
- Communes of the Meurthe-et-Moselle department
