= Renault Tracer =

Class of buses produced by Renault Trucks

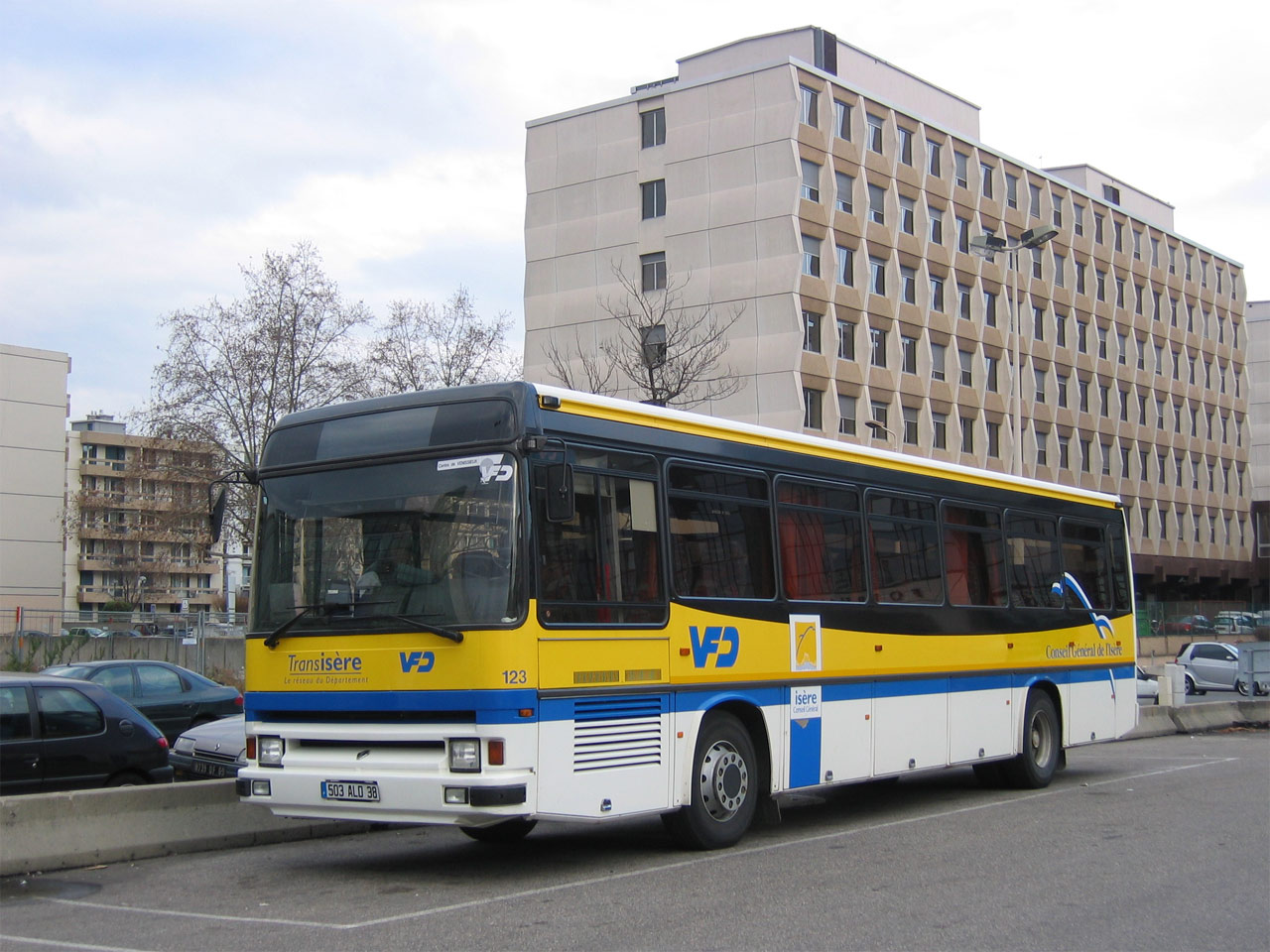
- Renault Tracer

Overview
- Manufacturer: Renault

Powertrain
- Engine: 9.8 litre I6 turbodiesel, 186 kW (253 PS; 249 hp)

The Renault Tracer (R332A) is a class of buses produced by the bus division of Renault Trucks from 1991 to 2001.

The Tracer was powered by a six-cylinder Renault diesel engine of approximately 9.8 litres, producing 186 kW (253 PS). It was succeeded by the Renault Ares, which was later marketed under the Irisbus brand.

The Tracer buses were replaced by the Irisbus Arés in 2001.
