= Renault GBC 180 =

French military heavy cargo truck

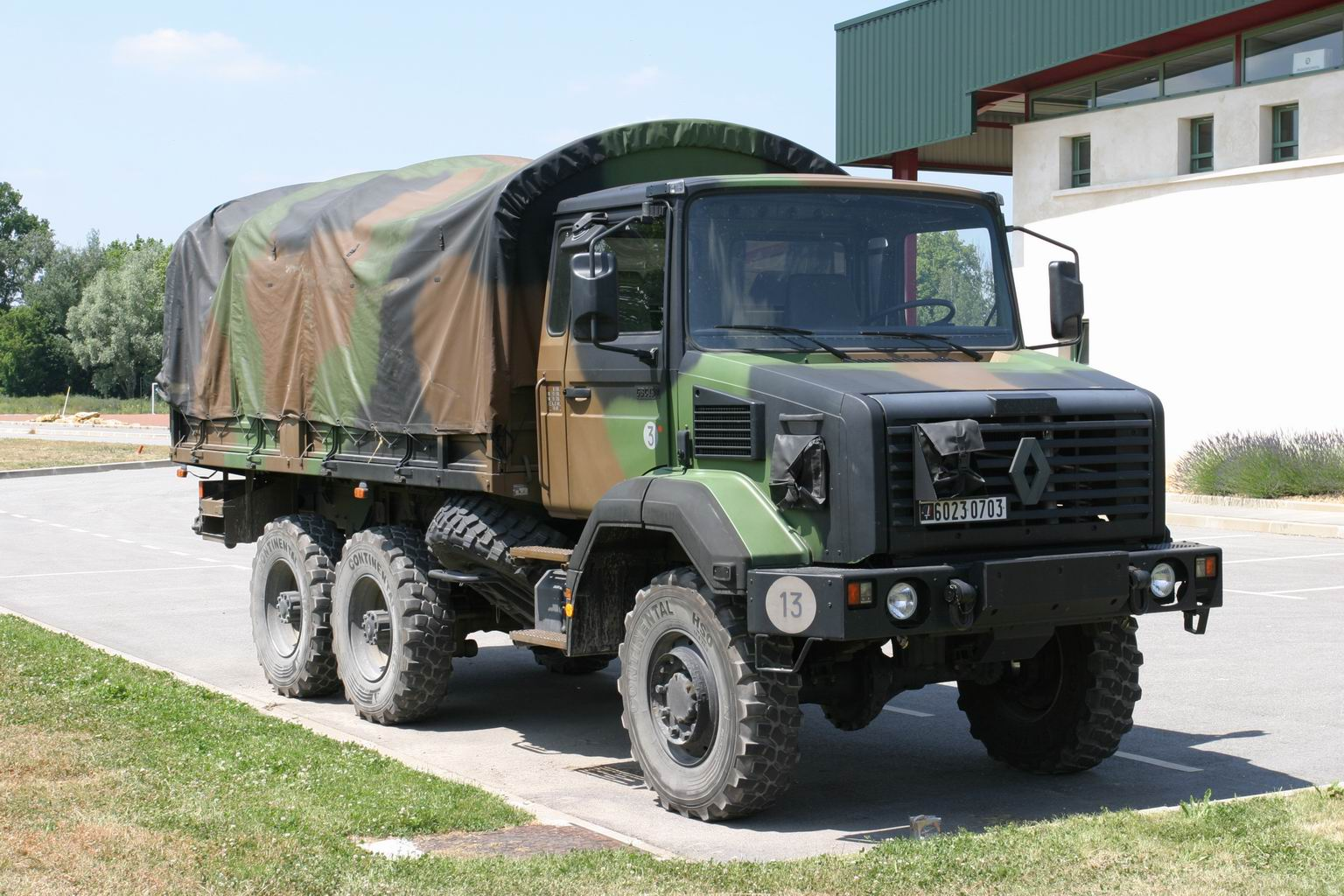
- Type: Heavy cargo truck
- Place of origin: France

Service history
- In service: Late 1990s
- Used by: French Army

Production history
- Manufacturer: Renault Trucks
- Produced: 1997 to Present
- No. built: 5,500+

Specifications
- Length: 7.27–8.25 m (23 ft 10 in – 27 ft 1 in)
- Width: 2.49 m (8 ft 2 in)
- Height: 2.92–3.27 m (9 ft 7 in – 10 ft 9 in)
- Crew: 2 + 15
- Engine: Renault 6 cylinder diesel 130 kW (175 hp)
- Payload capacity: 5,000 kg (11,000 lb)
- Ground clearance: 0.60 m (2 ft 0 in)
- Operational range: ≥800 km (500 mi)
- Maximum speed: 88 km/h (55 mph)

The Renault GBC 180 is an all-terrain truck used by the French armed forces since the late 1990s.

== History ==
The GBC 180 is an advanced upgrade and refurbished version of the Berliet GBC 8 KT, with a new engine and transmission, and an increased payload of 5,000 kg (11,000 lb).

The GBC 180 conversion was announced in 1997, when a first batch of 2,800 trucks were ordered. By 2009, over 5,500 trucks were upgraded to the GBC 180 variant.

== Characteristics ==
The GBC 180 has a 175 PS (129 kW), six-cylinder diesel engine displacing 6.2 litres (1.4 imp gal; 1.6 US gal), the MIDR 06.02.26. The engine can run on diesel or kerosene.
