= Renault FR1 =

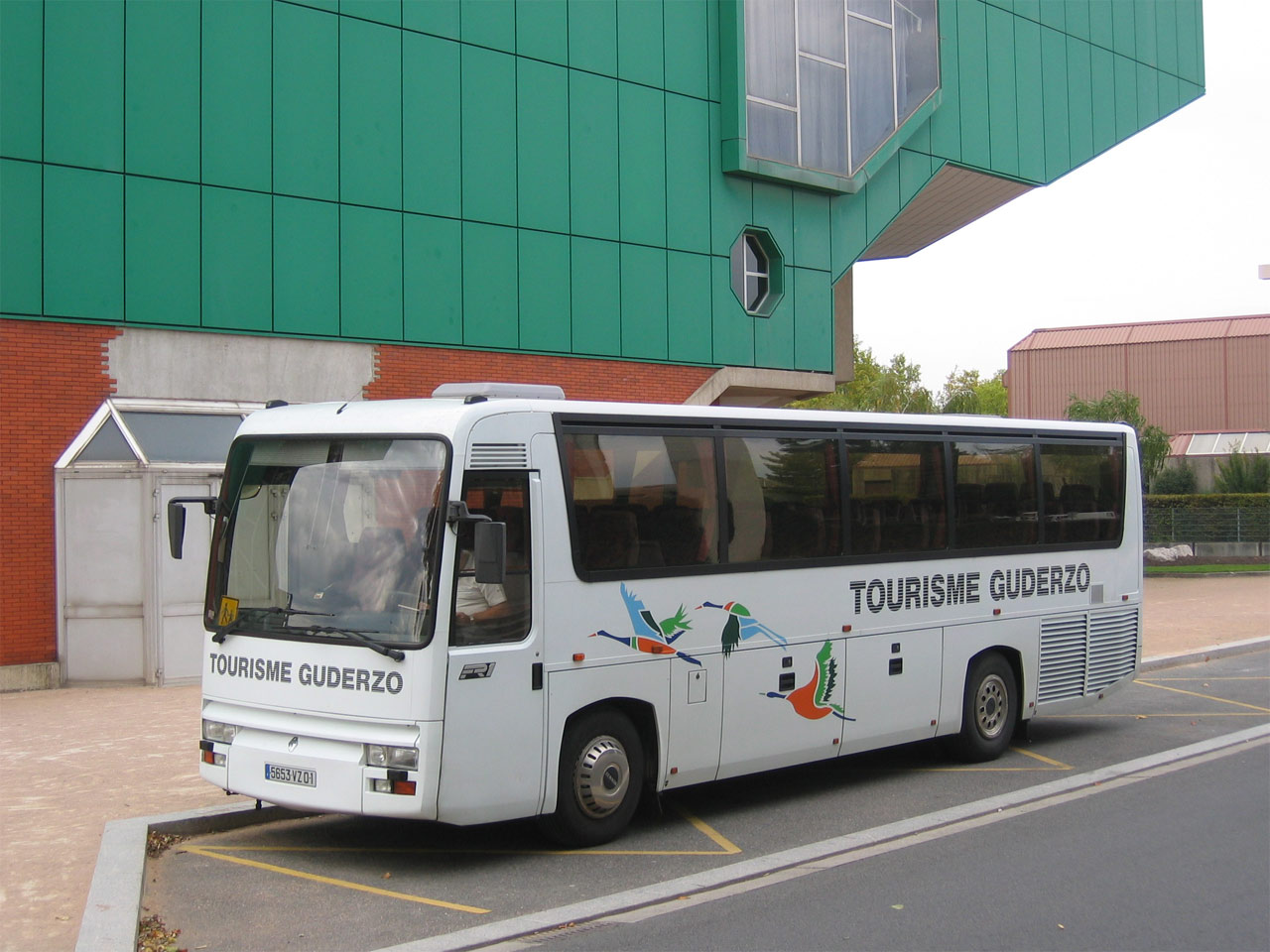
- Renault FR1

Overview
- Manufacturer: Renault Vehicùles Industries (RVI)
- Production: 1983–1997

Body and chassis
- Doors: 1 or 2
- Floor type: Step entrance
- Related: Renault Iliade; Irisbus Evadys; Irisbus Crossway

Powertrain
- Engine: 9.9 litre I6 turbodiesel, 223 kW (303 PS; 299 hp) and 250 kW (340 PS; 335 hp)
- Capacity: 45 seated
- Transmission: 6-speed manual

Dimensions
- Length: 11.3m, 12m, 12.8m
- Width: 2.6m
- Height: 4.1m

Chronology
- Successor: Renault Iliade

The Renault FR1 was a single-decker coach produced by the bus division of Renault Trucks in France from 1987 to 1997.

The engine is a 6-cylinder Renault engine with a displacement of 9,834 cc, available in two variants, 223 kW (303 PS; 299 hp) and 250 kW (340 PS; 335 hp). Models were designated TE, TX and GTX and it is optional to have 1 door or 2 doors.

The model was facelifted in 1997 and renamed Renault Iliade to replace the normal FR1.

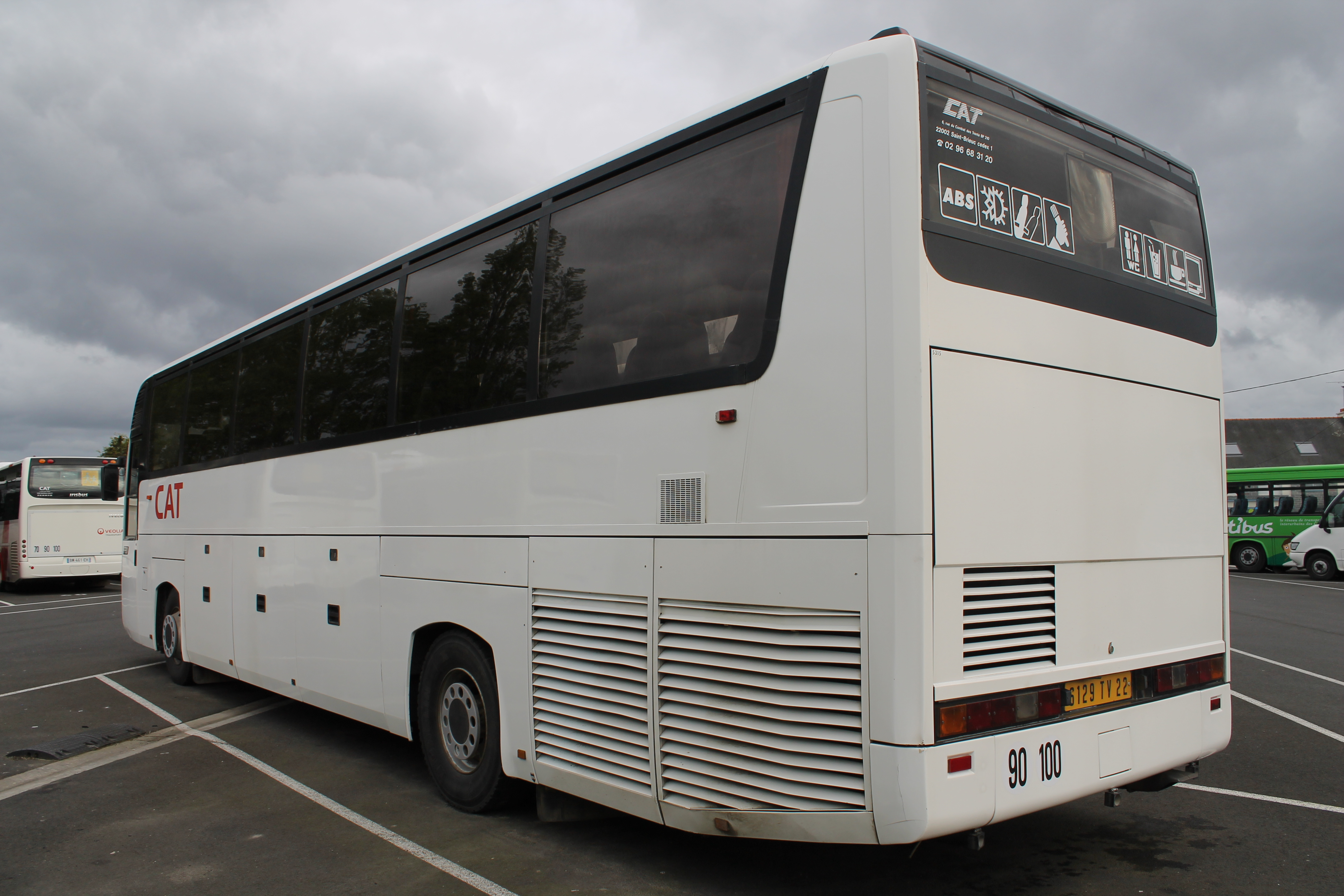
Renault FR1 rear

== See also ==
- List of buses
