= Renault Trucks =

French truck manufacturer

Renault Trucks SAS
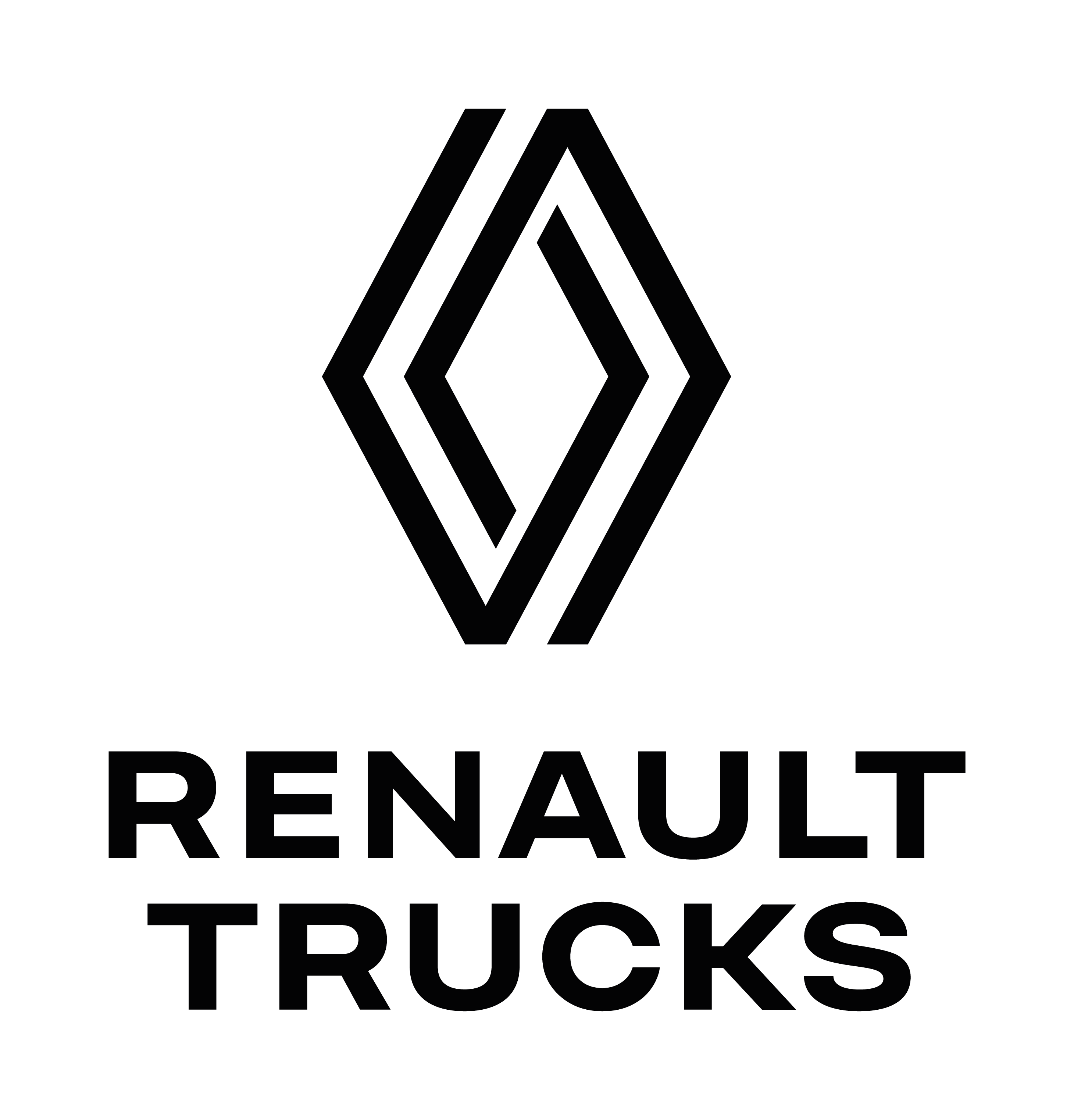
- Type: Subsidiary
- Industry: Automotive
- Predecessor: Saviem; Berliet; Dodge UK
- Founded: 1978 (as a merger between Saviem and Berliet)
- Headquarters: Saint-Priest, Auvergne-Rhône-Alpes, France
- Key people: Antoine Duclaux (President)
- Products: Trucks, military vehicles
- Revenue: ▼€6.42 billion (2024)
- Net income: ▲€201 million (2024)
- Number of employees: 7,554 (2018)
- Parent: Volvo
- Subsidiaries: Renault Trucks Defense
- Website: www.renault-trucks.com

Renault Trucks is a French commercial truck manufacturer with corporate headquarters at Saint-Priest near Lyon. Originally part of Renault, it has been a subsidiary of Volvo since 2001.

From its beginnings in 1978 to 2002, the company was called Renault Véhicules Industriels (Renault Industrial Vehicles), from 1992 on officially written as Renault V. I.. Until 2002, Renault Véhicules Industriels also manufactured buses.

== History ==
Renault first began building dedicated commercial trucks in 1906. In 1956, however Renault stopped producing trucks and buses under its own name. Instead, the company Saviem was formed as a subsidiary of their own commercial products with the manufacturers Somua and Latil. Lighter commercials kept on using the Renault name, however. From 1957 on, Saviem was also used as the brand name for the trucks and buses produced by the company.

As a result of French industrial policy, in 1975 state-owned Renault also acquired the truck and bus manufacturer Berliet from Citroën (at that time a part of the Michelin corporation). In 1978, Berliet and Saviem were merged to form Renault Véhicules Industriels. Again, the old brand names were retained for two more years while the model lineups were gradually incorporated, until in 1980 they were replaced by the name Renault.

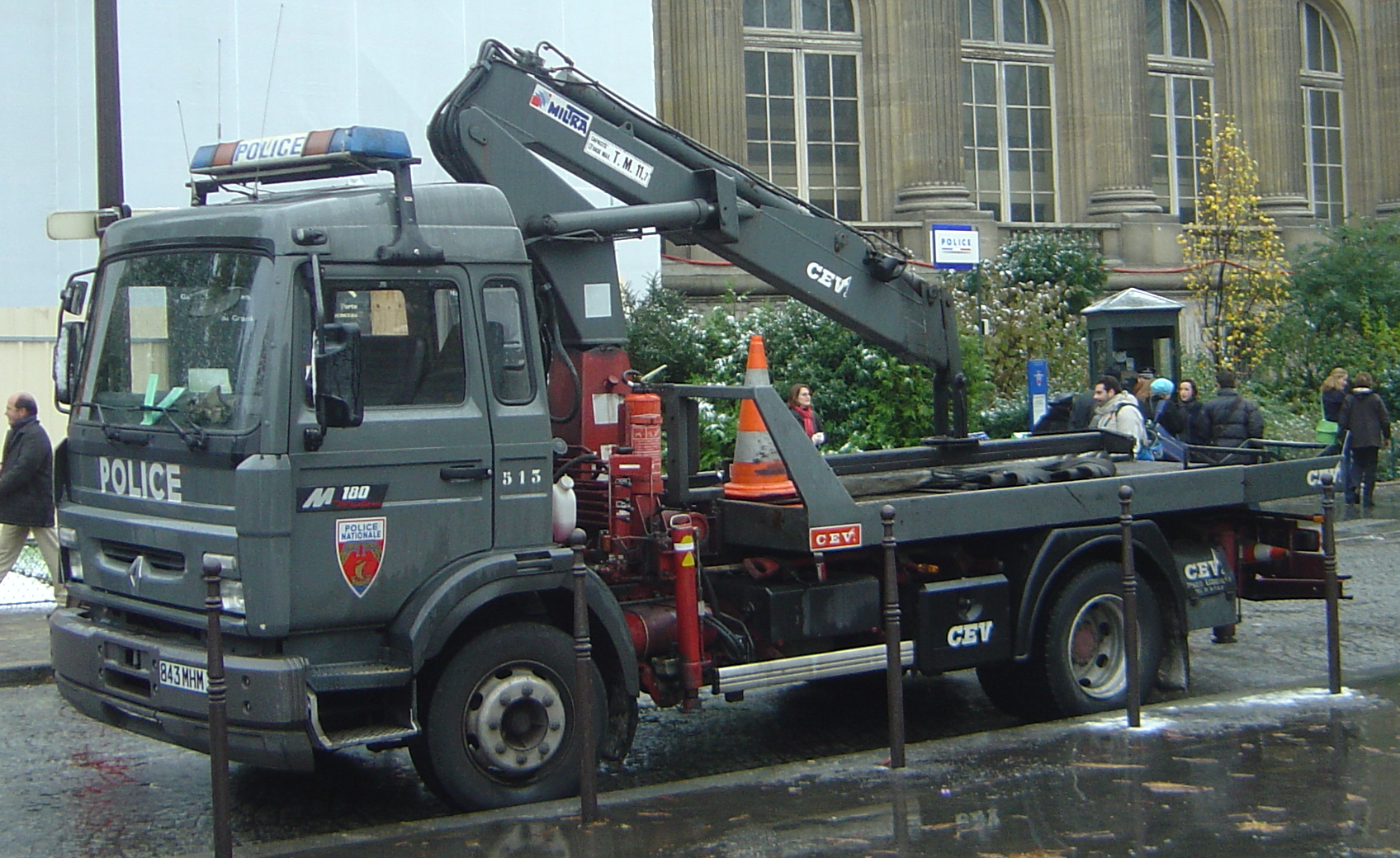
Renault Midliner with Club of Four cab, late 1990s model

In 1971, Saviem became a member of the Euro Truck Development Group or Club of Four, a cooperation between four European truck producers (Saviem, Volvo, DAF and Magirus-Deutz, which soon after became a part of Iveco) for the production of medium-sized trucks. Since 1975 the truck models resulting from this cooperation were built by Saviem and later Renault, even until 2001. They were also sold on the North American market as the Mack Mid-Liner or Manager.

In 1978, PSA Group bought Chrysler's European operations. Included in the deal were commercial vehicle operations in the UK and Spain, which at that time used the brand name Dodge. PSA however sold them on to RVI in 1983, having itself little interest in the commercial vehicle market. The newly acquired operations in the UK had their origins in the commercial vehicle branch of the Rootes Group which originally carried the brand names Karrier and Commer. Some of the models built there were continued in production for several years by RVI in Dunstable, Bedfordshire, who also kept the Dodge brand name for these models, albeit in combination with the Renault badge. In 1988 the company was subject to a Fire Brigades Union inquiry due to eight Dodge fire engines involved in crashes. Until 1992 the UK division was known as Renault Truck Industries, after which it then took the international Renault V.I. name.

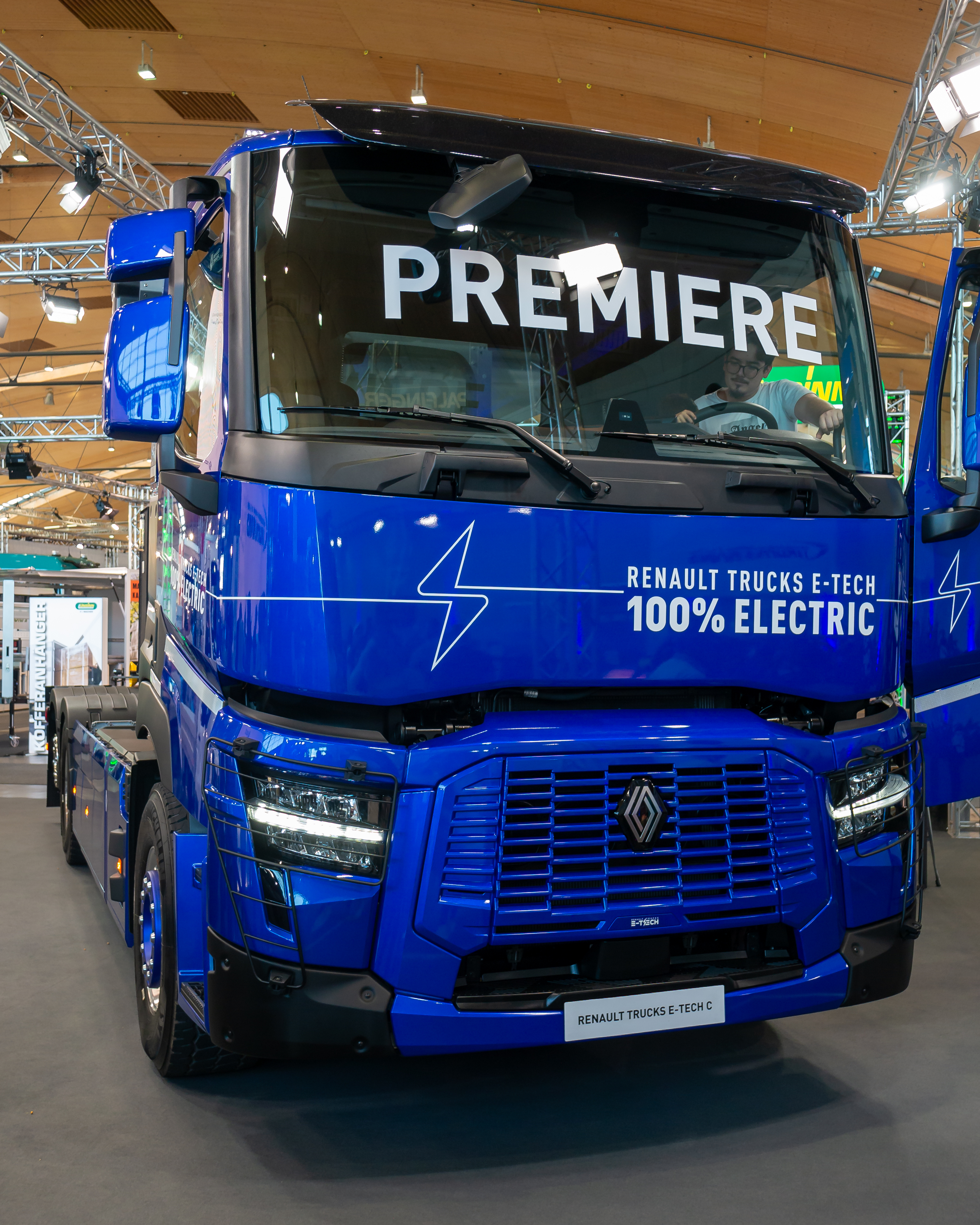
Revised branding introduced in late 2022 as seen on the grille of a Renault Trucks C E-Tech (or E-Tech C). It is similar to the one introduced earlier by the related Renault brand.

In Spain, however, where Renault already was recognized as a local automobile producer, the Dodge trucks, which originally had been developed by the manufacturer Barreiros Diesel, were rebadged as Renaults and soon after replaced by French-designed models.

In 1987, Renault Véhicules Industriels took over from its parent company Renault a 42% stake in the American manufacturer Mack Trucks which became a fully owned subsidiary of Renault Véhicules Industriels in 1990.

In 1991, RVI purchased a 37.5% shareholding in French bodybuilder Heuliez Bus. In 1994, RVI purchased a 34% stake in the Czech bus manufacturer Karosa, increasing its ownership to a majority 51% in 1996 and 96% in 2000. In 1997 Renault V. I. entered into a cooperation agreement with the Finnish truck producer Sisu. In 2002 the company signed a deal with the Chinese company Dongfeng Motor to manufacture engines.

Renault Trucks took part in the FIA European Championship, running Renault Premium powered by 13-litre DXi13 engines. The Renault Trucks-MKR Technology team won in 2010.

Also, the Uruguayan plant of cars owned by Nordex S.A. in Uruguay has made since 2004 the Renault Trucks models like Midlum series.

The Volvo Group invested about €2 billion to develop a new line of Renault Trucks vehicles (C, D, K, T) which were introduced through 2013 replacing the previous models.

== Changes of ownership ==
As part of Renault's restructuring following privatisation in 1996, the heavy vehicles operations of bus and truck were divested. In 1999, the Renault and Karosa bus and coach operations were split off from Renault Véhicules Industriels and merged with Fiat-Iveco's bus and coach operations to form the jointly owned subsidiary Irisbus. In 2003, Irisbus became a full subsidiary of Iveco and the brand Renault on its products was replaced by the brand Irisbus.

In April 2000, Renault agreed to terms with Volvo to purchase its truck manufacturing business with Volvo in turn to relinquish its 15% shareholding in Renault and Renault buy a 20% shareholding in Volvo. The transaction which included Mack Trucks, but not Renault's stake in Irisbus, was completed on 2 January 2001. RVI was renamed Renault Trucks in 2002. In October 2010 Renault reduced its shareholding in Volvo to 5%. In December 2012, Renault sold its remaining shares in Volvo.

== Military vehicles ==
The Renault Trucks Defense division is wholly owned by Renault Trucks and is based in Versailles, France. It trades on its 1975 acquisition of Berliet and claims to have over 30,000 vehicles in use around the world. Its status as the leading supplier to the French Army was put in jeopardy in 2010 when the government placed a $214m order to Italian competitor Iveco. In 2016, Volvo announced its intention of divesting Renault Trucks Defense, as part of the selling of its Government Sales division.

It manufactures a range of special vehicles aimed at the defense and security markets, including the Sherpa, VAB armoured personnel carrier, the AMC armoured multirole carrier and Kerax ranges.

In May 16, 2006 Renault Trucks took over ACMAT, but the defence and security vehicle manufacturer retained its own name and identity.

On 24 May 2018, Renault Trucks Defense was renamed as Arquus.

== Products ==
=== Current products ===
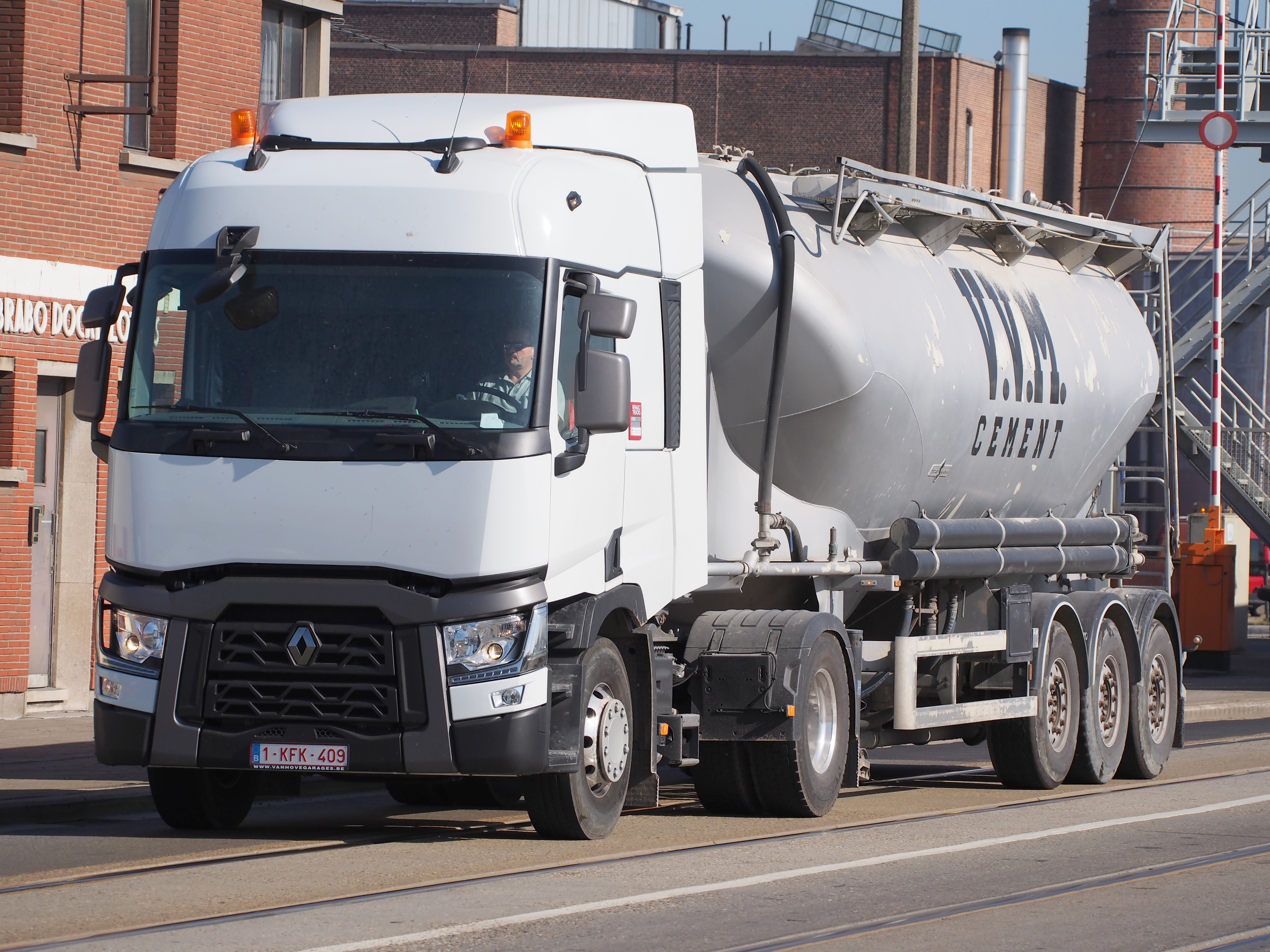
Renault Trucks T

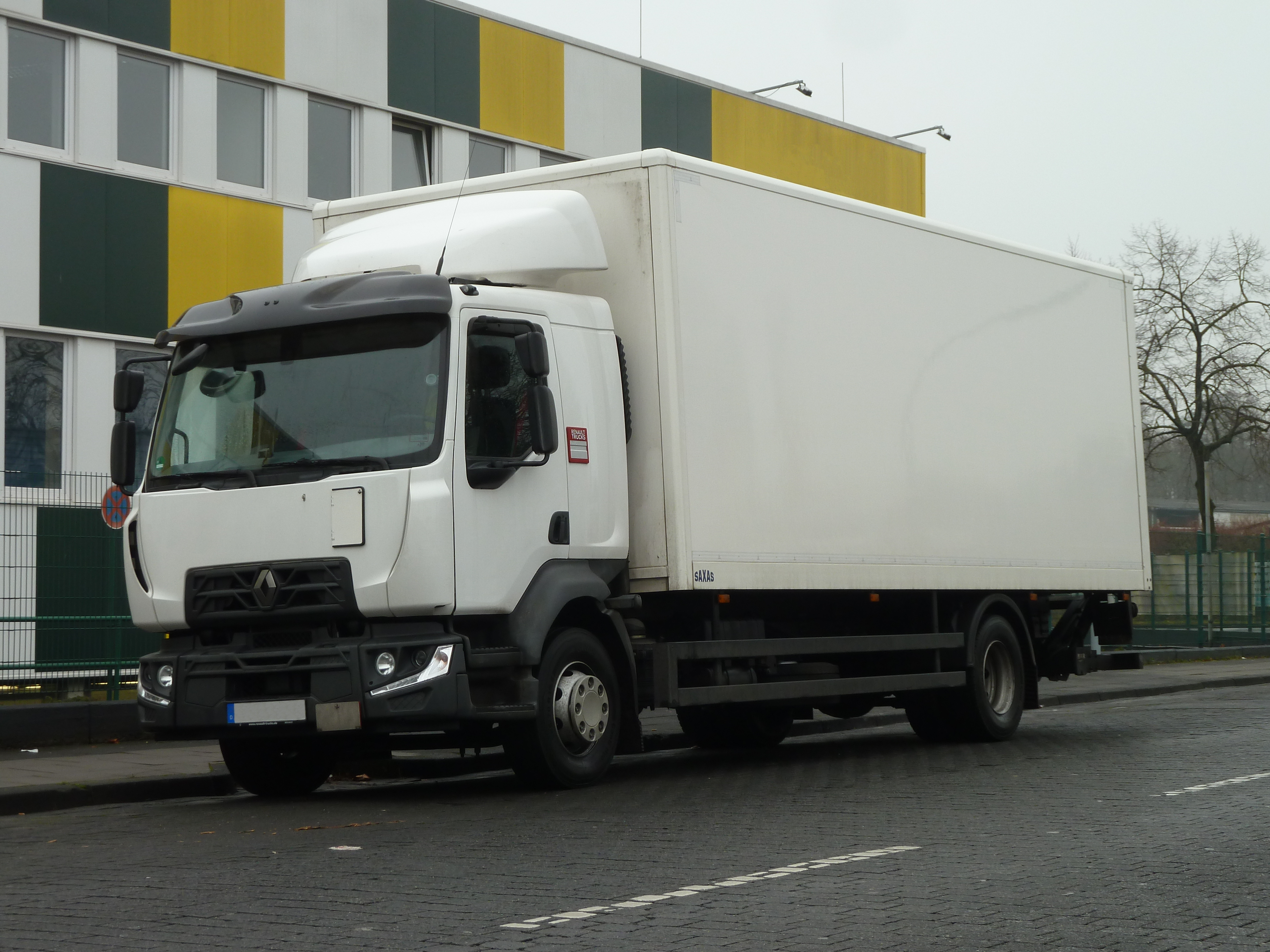
Renault Trucks D

==== Delivery range ====
The Renault Master is a large van produced by the French manufacturer Renault since 1980, now in its fourth generation. It replaced the earlier Renault Super Goélette light trucks. It is also sold as the Nissan Interstar. Opel and Vauxhall have sold versions of the second and third series vans as the Opel Movano in Continental Europe and Vauxhall Movano in the United Kingdom. All four generations have been designed and manufactured by Renault, irrespective of the brand. Renault Trucks markets it as the Renault Trucks Master.

The Renault Trafic (pronounced as "traffic") is a light commercial van produced by the French automaker Renault since 1980. It has also been marketed as the Fiat Talento, the Nissan NV300, the Nissan Primastar and the Mitsubishi Express. Until 2019, it was also sold as the Opel/Vauxhall Vivaro (briefly sold as the Opel/Vauxhall Arena earlier) by Opel and its associated company Vauxhall. From early 2022 onwards, the van is also marketed by Renault Trucks as the Renault Trucks Trafic.

==== Distribution range ====
The Renault Trucks D is a range of medium duty trucks for distribution manufactured by the French truckmaker Renault Trucks. It was launched in 2013 to replace the Midlum, the Premium Distribution and the Access.

==== Construction range ====
The Renault Trucks C is a range of medium duty/high duty trucks for construction manufactured by the French truckmaker Renault Trucks introduced in 2013.

The Renault Trucks K is a range of heavy-duty trucks for construction introduced in 2013 by the French truckmaker Renault Trucks.

==== Long distance range ====
The Renault Trucks T is a range of heavy-duty trucks manufactured by Renault Trucks. The truck was presented on 11 June 2013 with a show called R/Evolution and was introduced at the end of 2013, being the first from a new line of vehicles for the company. An electric version was introduced in 2023.

==== Military SUVs ====
The Sherpa Light is a family of 4x4 tactical and light armoured vehicles developed by French company Renault Trucks Defense (RTD). Available in unarmoured or armoured variants (ballistic, mine and IED kits), the Scout is suited for tactical missions such as scouting, patrol, convoy escort and command and liaison. It is able to transport up to four or five soldiers or a total payload of up to four tonnes.

==== Military trucks ====
The Renault GBC 180 is an all-terrain truck used by the French armed forces since the late 1990s.

The Renault Sherpa 5 is a tactical military truck made by Renault Trucks subsidiary Renault Trucks Defense, renamed Arquus in 2018. It evolved from the Renault GBC 180.

=== Future products ===
- Renault Trucks Oxygen

In 2023, Sparrow Recovery took delivery of the first 120 tonne Renault Truck C520 recovery vehicle currently operating in the UK.

=== Former truck models ===
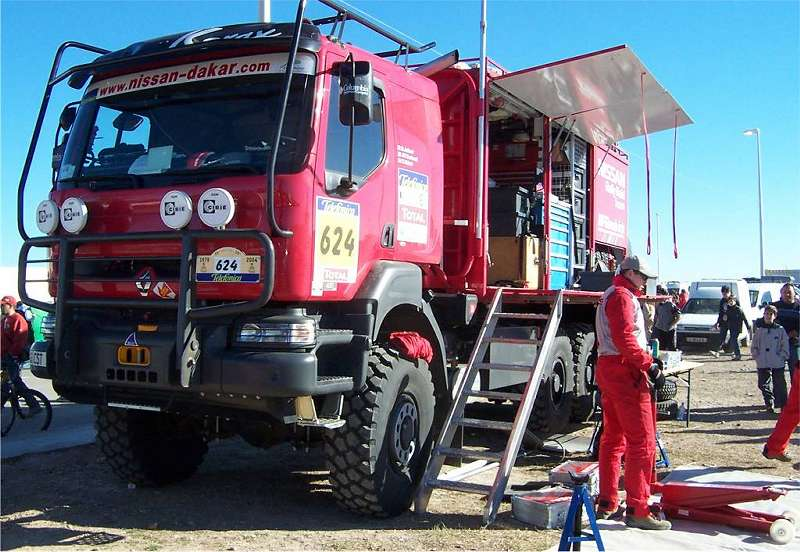
Renault Kerax as service vehicle at 2004 Dakar Rally

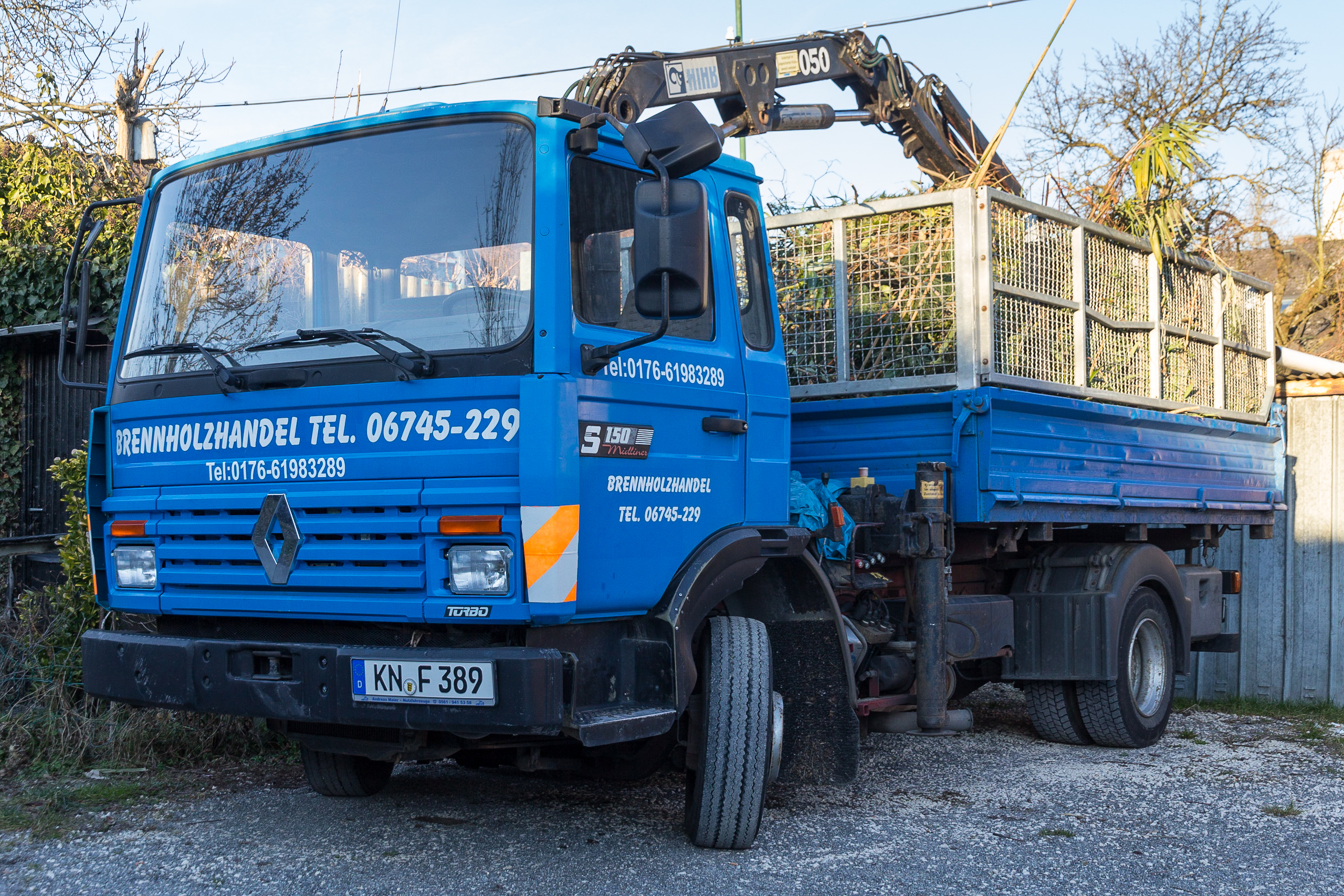
Renault S150 Midliner

- Dodge 50
- Dodge 100
- Dodge 300
- Renault Access, joint venture with Dennis Eagle, replaced Renault Puncher in 2010
- Renault C
- Renault B/Renault Messenger
- Renault J
- Renault M/Renault S (Midliner)
- Renault G (Manager/Maxter)
- Renault Kerax
- Renault R (Major)
- Renault Magnum
- Renault Mascott
- Renault Maxity (built in Spain as a version of the Nissan Cabstar)
- Renault Midlum (sold in Australia as Mack Midlum)
- Renault Puncher 280 HP / 20 or 26 tonnes.
- Renault Premium (sold in Australia as Mack Premium, in New Zealand as Mack Quantum)
- Renault Premium Lander
- Renault Premium Route

=== Former bus models ===
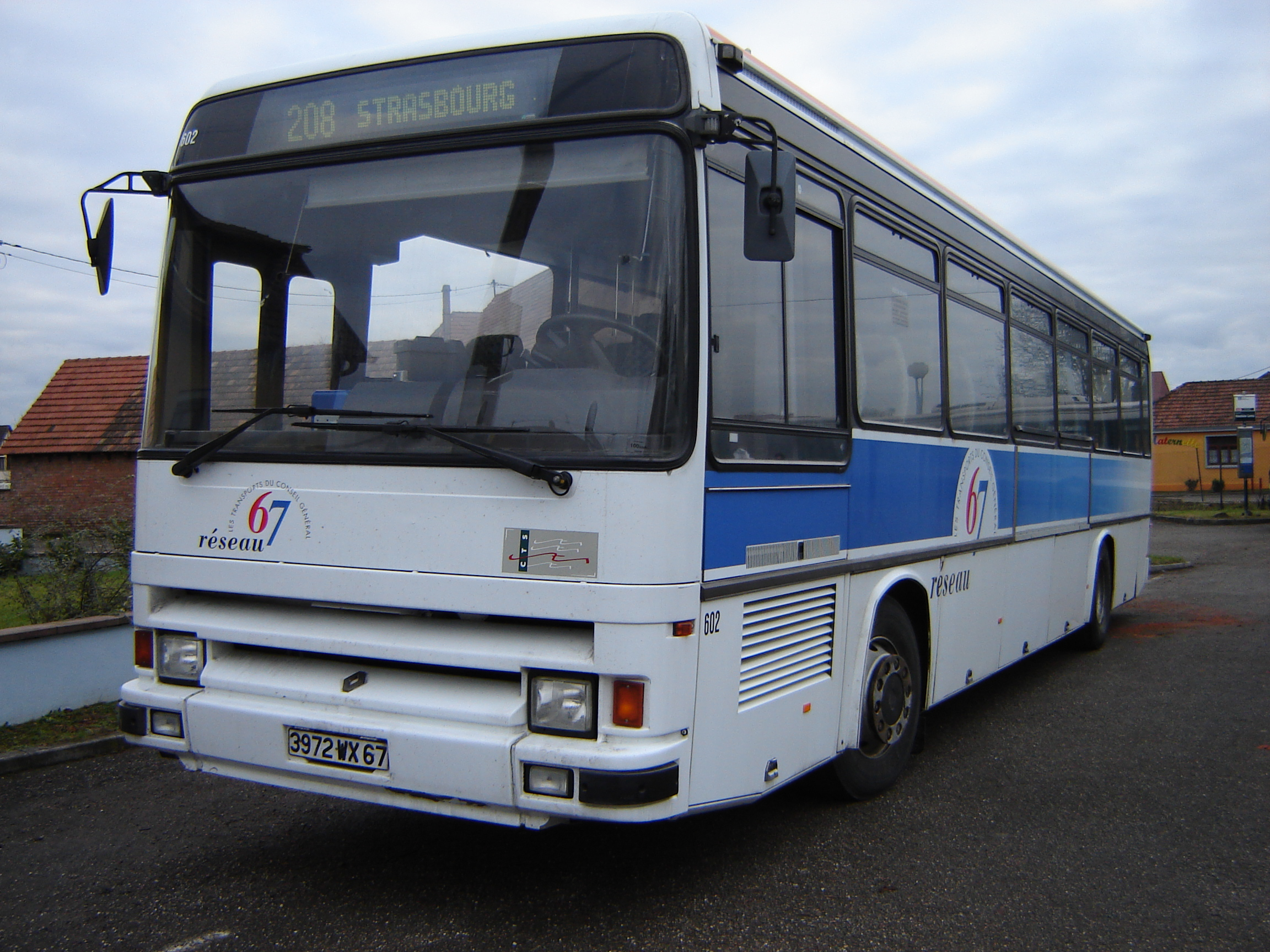
Renault Tracer bus

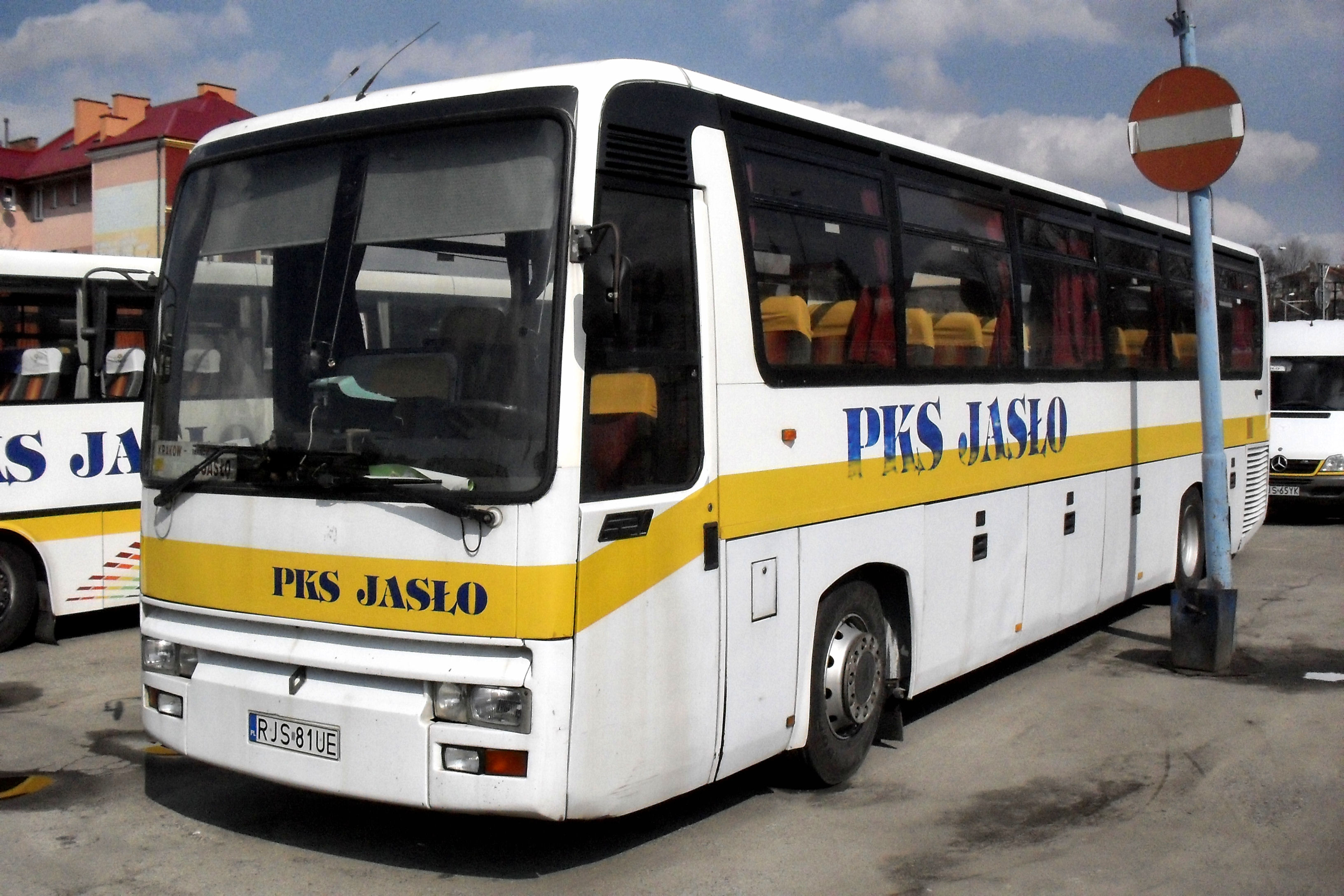
Renault FR1 bus

- Renault PR100, previously sold under the Berliet name, launched in 1972. Some Australian versions of the PR100.2 carried dual Renault and Mack logos
- Renault PR112 was a 1994 upgrade to the PR100 using a front end designed by coachbuilder Safra
- Renault PR180 was the articulated version of the PR100, launched in 1981, later to become the Renault PR112 following a facelift
- Renault R312, replaced in 1996 by the Renault Agora, then renamed Irisbus Agora in 2002. In Australia it was sold as the Renault PR100.3
- Renault Recreo school bus built by Karosa
- Renault SC10, initially sold as the Saviem SC10 from 1965, and then in 1981 it was upgraded to the Renault SC10R when the distinctive curved front window was lost. The SC10U, and its replacement SC10RA featured the unique open rear deck.
- Renault Tracer, replaced by Renault Arés in 2000 and renamed Irisbus Arés in 2001

=== Former coaches models ===
- Renault E7, originally launched as the Saviem E7 in 1969
- Renault PR14, originally launched in 1974 as the Berliet Crusair
- Renault PR80S, derived from the Renault PR100
- Renault S-Series coach was marketed as Renault (such as the Renault S45), Saviem and Saviem-Chausson during its production period of 1977 to 1993
- Renault FR1, sold for a short time in the US as Mack FR1. Facelifted and renamed Renault Iliade in 1997

=== Former trolley bus and tram models ===
- Renault ER100, originally launched under the Berliet name in 1977, replaced by the Irisbus Cristalis
- Renault PER180, diesel-trolleybus hybrid based on the Renault PR180
- Renault Civis was quickly rebranded Irisbus Civis following the sale of Renault Bus

=== Concept vehicles ===
- Renault Radiance (2004)
- Renault Magnum Vega
