= Renault Trafic E-Tech =

Renault Trafic E-Tech refers to two different vehicles:

- Trafic Van E-Tech, introduced in 2022, based on the third-generation Renault Trafic
- Renault FlexEVan, scheduled for release in 2026, built on the Ampere SDV architecture
