= Opel Arena =

Opel Arena may refer to:

- Opel Arena (van), a light commercial van sold from 1997 until 2001
- Opel Arena (stadium), a multi-purpose stadium in Mainz, Germany
