= Renault Trafic =

Light commercial vehicle

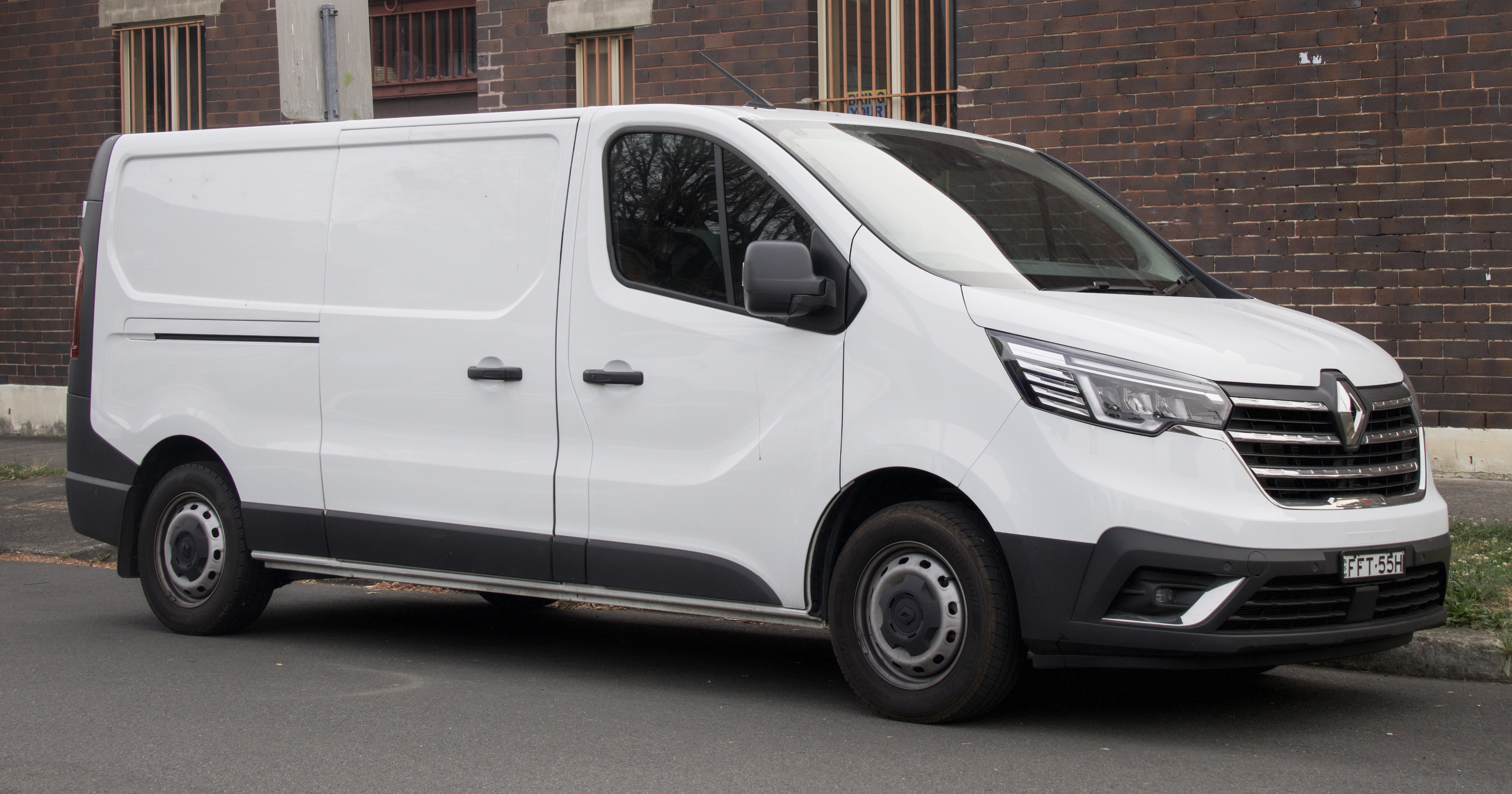

Overview
- Manufacturer: Renault
- Production: 1980–present

Body and chassis
- Class: Light commercial vehicle/Large MPV (M)
- Body style: Van; Minibus; Pickup truck
- Layout: FF layout (FR layout and 4x4 available for the 1st generation model)

Chronology
- Predecessor: Renault Estafette; Bedford/Vauxhall Midi (Vauxhall Arena); Bedford CF (Opel/Vauxhall Arena); Fiat Scudo (2016–2021)
- Successor: Citroën-based Opel/Vauxhall Vivaro/Fiat Scudo (for Opel/Vauxhall and Fiat models)

The Renault Trafic (pronounced as "traffic") is a light commercial van produced by the French automaker Renault since 1980. It has also been marketed as the Fiat Talento, the Nissan NV300, the Nissan Primastar and the Mitsubishi Express. Until 2019, it was also sold as the Opel/Vauxhall Vivaro (briefly sold as the Opel/Vauxhall Arena earlier) by Opel and its associated company Vauxhall. From early 2022 onwards, the van is also marketed by Renault Trucks as the Renault Trucks Trafic.

Previous versions of the Renault Trafic have been sold under Inokom, Chevrolet and Tata badges.

The second generation Vauxhall/Opel Vivaro was produced in GM Manufacturing Luton and in Sandouville Renault Factory plant starting in 2014. However, following the sale of Opel/Vauxhall from General Motors to Groupe PSA in 2017, which later went into car manufacturing merged with Fiat Chrysler Automobiles in 2021 as Stellantis, the Trafic-based Vivaro went out of production in 2019, and was replaced by the next generation Vivaro based on the Citroën Jumpy's EMP2 Platform for the 2020 model year.

== First generation (1980) ==
First generation
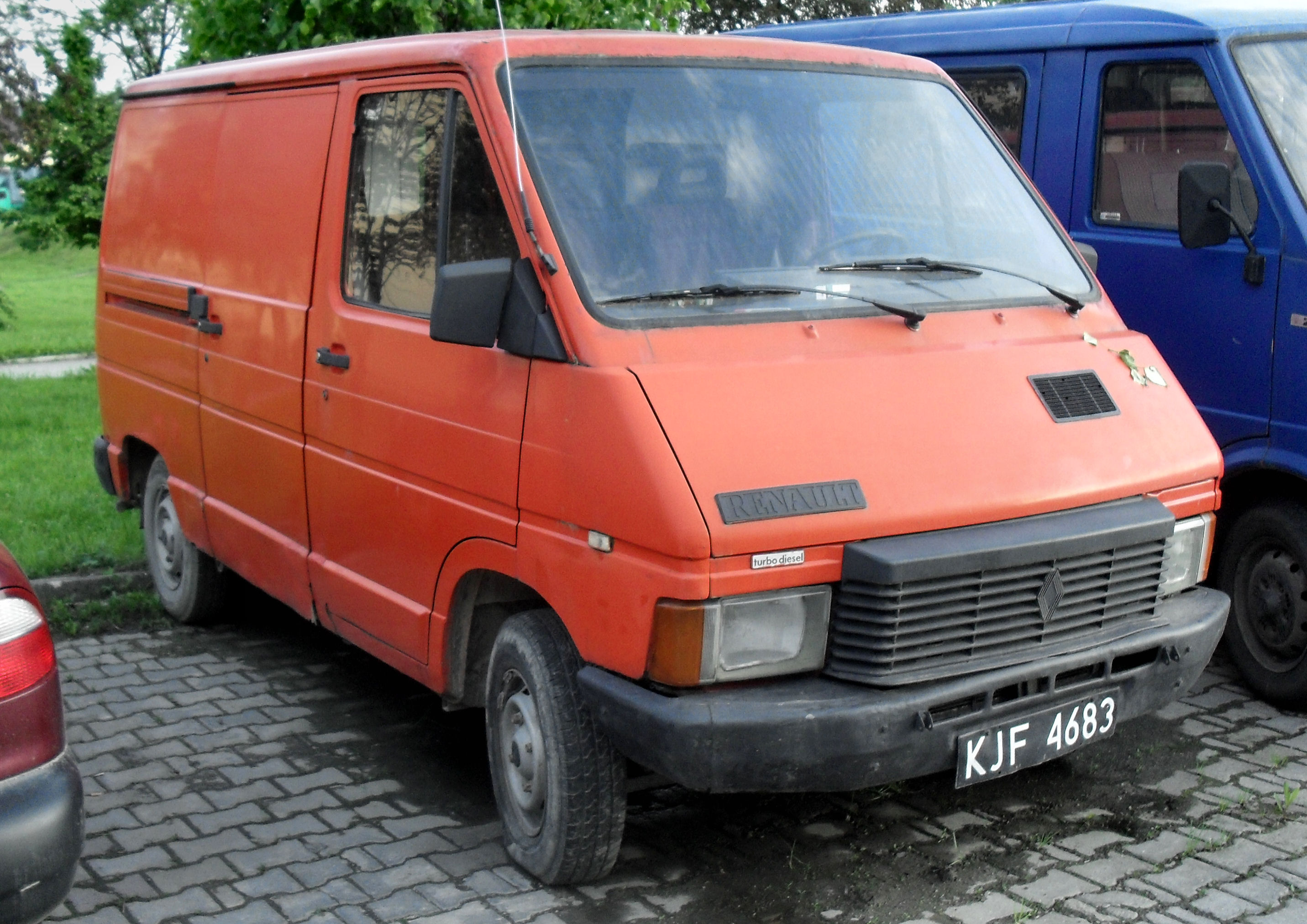

Overview
- Manufacturer: Renault
- Also called: Opel Arena; Vauxhall Arena; Chevrolet Trafic; Chevrolet Space Van; Winnebago LeSharo; Inokom Permas (Malaysia); Tata Winger
- Production: 1980–2001; 1995–2004 (China); 1997–2001 (Opel/Vauxhall Arena)
- Assembly: France: Batilly (RENAULT Sovab); Spain: Barcelona (RESA); Chile: Los Andes (Renault Chile); Argentina: Santa Isabel (CIADEA); China: Xiaogan (Sanjiang Renault); Uruguay: Montevideo (Nordex S.A.)

Body and chassis
- Class: Light commercial vehicle (M)
- Body style: 4/5-door van 2-door pickup truck 5-door minibus
- Layout: FF layout, FR layout, 4x4
- Related: Renault Master; Tata Winger

Powertrain
- Engine: Petrol: 1397 cc C1J I4; 1647 cc A1M I4; 1721 cc F1N I4; 2165 cc J6T/J7T I4; Diesel: 2068 cc J8S I4; 2068 cc J8S Turbodiesel I4; 2445 cc S8U I4; 2499 cc S9U I4
- Transmission: 4-speed manual; 5-speed manual

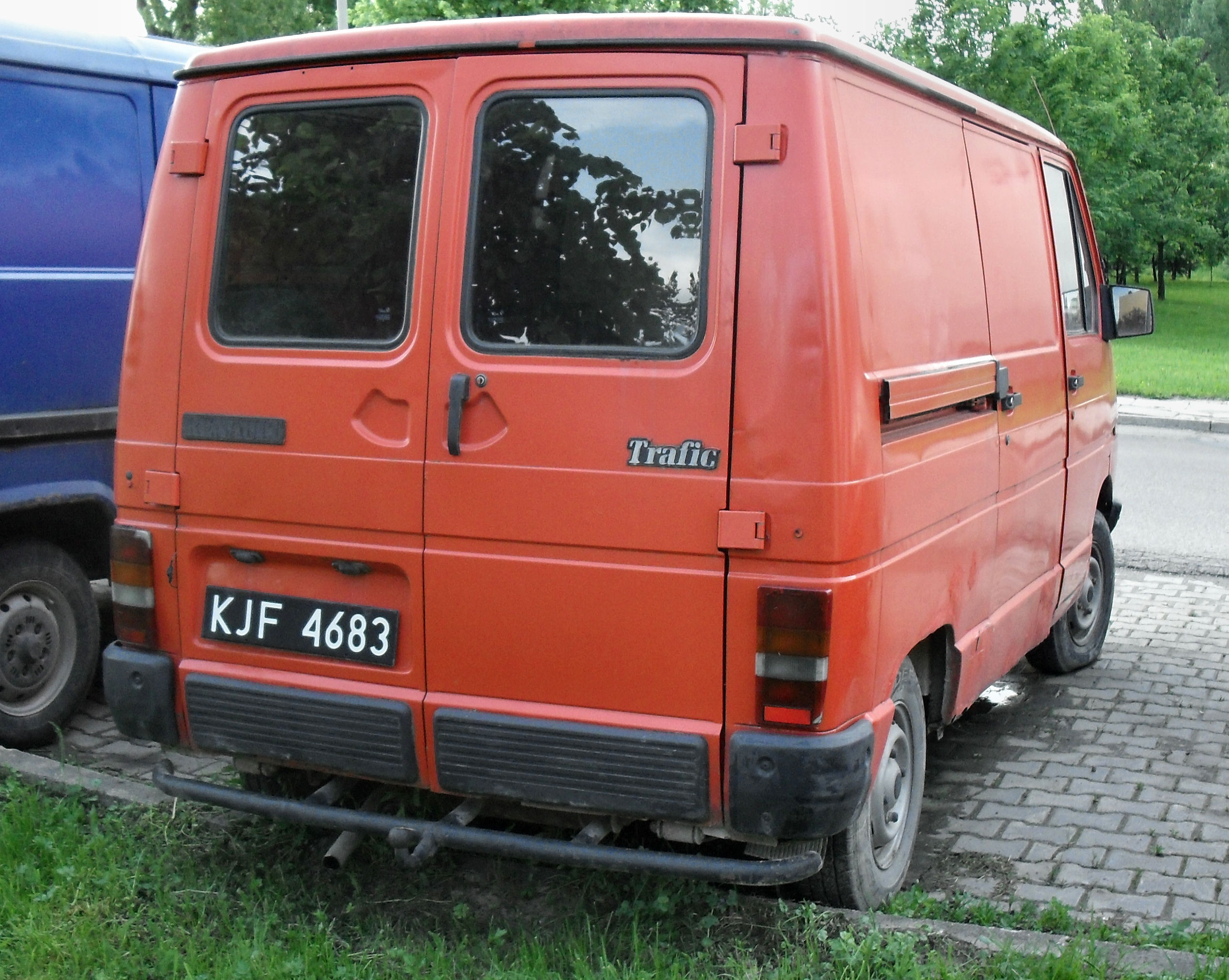
Pre facelift Renault Trafic (rear)

The original Renault Trafic was sold from 1980 to 2001 and was somewhat revised and updated during its lifetime.

Originally, the van had some variations in the front end shape depending on which engine was fitted, with the original 1397 cc motor fitting behind a flat grille, and the 2.1-litre diesel engine and larger 1647 cc petrol engines requiring an extended plastic grille and deeper bumper.

The 1721 cc OHC engine replaced the 1647 cc OHV unit in the mid-1980s, which fitted under the shorter grille, but required a small lump in the bonnet. The diesel and 2.2-litre petrol carried on with the extended grille.

In the end of 1984, a four-wheel drive version was introduced. This was a part time system coupled with the diesel engine and a five speed manual transmission. This model operated as a front wheel drive until the rear wheels were engaged with a dog clutch, a system similar to the one used by Renault on the R18 4x4.

In May 1989, the Trafic underwent a major front end facelift, with a rounder shape and a plastic bumper, and the new longer body shape covering all varieties of engine. In 1995, the Mk1 Trafic got its final facelift, with a new grille, new tail lights, large double rear view mirrors, and a new interior with a modern dashboard and multi adjustable seats.

=== Winnebago ===
The chassis and cab of the 1980s models were used as the base vehicle by Winnebago Industries to build the Winnebago 'LeSharo' from 1983, and Itasca Phasar.

For the chassis and cab version to meet safety and emission requirements in the United States, this version was sold with Renault's J7T 2,165 cc (2.2 L) gasoline engine, and 2.1-litre diesel and turbo diesel engines, coded as J8S and shared with the 1985 to 1987 AMC/Jeep Cherokee/Commanche.

Jeep versions used the Garrett T2 turbocharger while Winnebagos received the larger T3 type. CARB granted a series of yearly waivers to Winnebago for non compliance in omitting On Board Diagnostics (OBD I), these waivers remained in effect throughout the model run from 1983 to 1992.

=== Campervan Variants ===
The Mk1 Trafic became popular for professional conversion into budget family motorhomes due to the flexibility of the design and the generous internal space for what was a relatively small van. Popular converters were Auto Sleepers and Holdsworth (now defunct). Other motorhome builders using the Trafic Mk1 as a base include Hymer, Elddis, Eriba, and Autostar.

=== Opel Arena ===
From 1997 to 2001, the Renault Trafic was marketed as the Opel Arena in Germany and as the Vauxhall Arena in the United Kingdom. Nick Reilly, Vauxhall's chairman and managing director commented that the Arena marked the first time the company could offer a total commercial range ever since the days of the old Bedford CF, which ended production in 1986.

=== Tata Winger ===
In June 2007, Tata Motors announced the introduction of the Winger, a panel van and minibus based on the 1995 to 2001 version of the Renault Trafic, but fitted with Tata's own two litre diesel engines, with or without turbo.

=== Inokom Permas ===
The Inokom Permas was launched in Malaysia in 1998. Production of the van was at Kulim District.

=== South America ===
For South America, the vehicle was made in the Renault Argentina facility at Santa Isabel, Córdoba. In Brazil, it was badged as Chevrolet Trafic and later as the Renault Trafic or Chevrolet SpaceVan. A pickup version was sold as the Renault Trafic Rodeo. Production ended in 2002.

=== Gallery ===
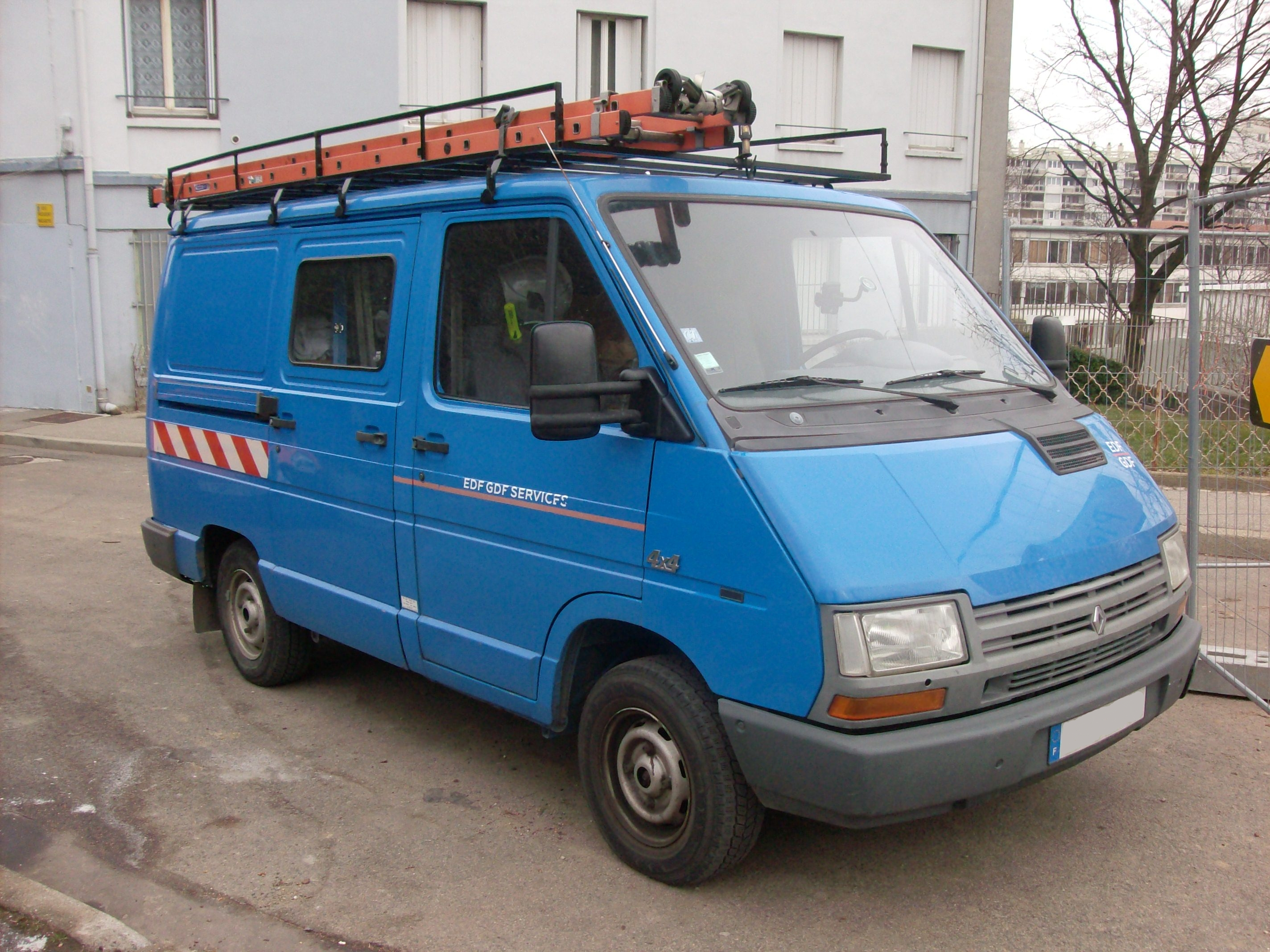
Renault Trafic first generation (facelift) 4x4 version: The 4x4 has the rear axle set further forward than the FWD.

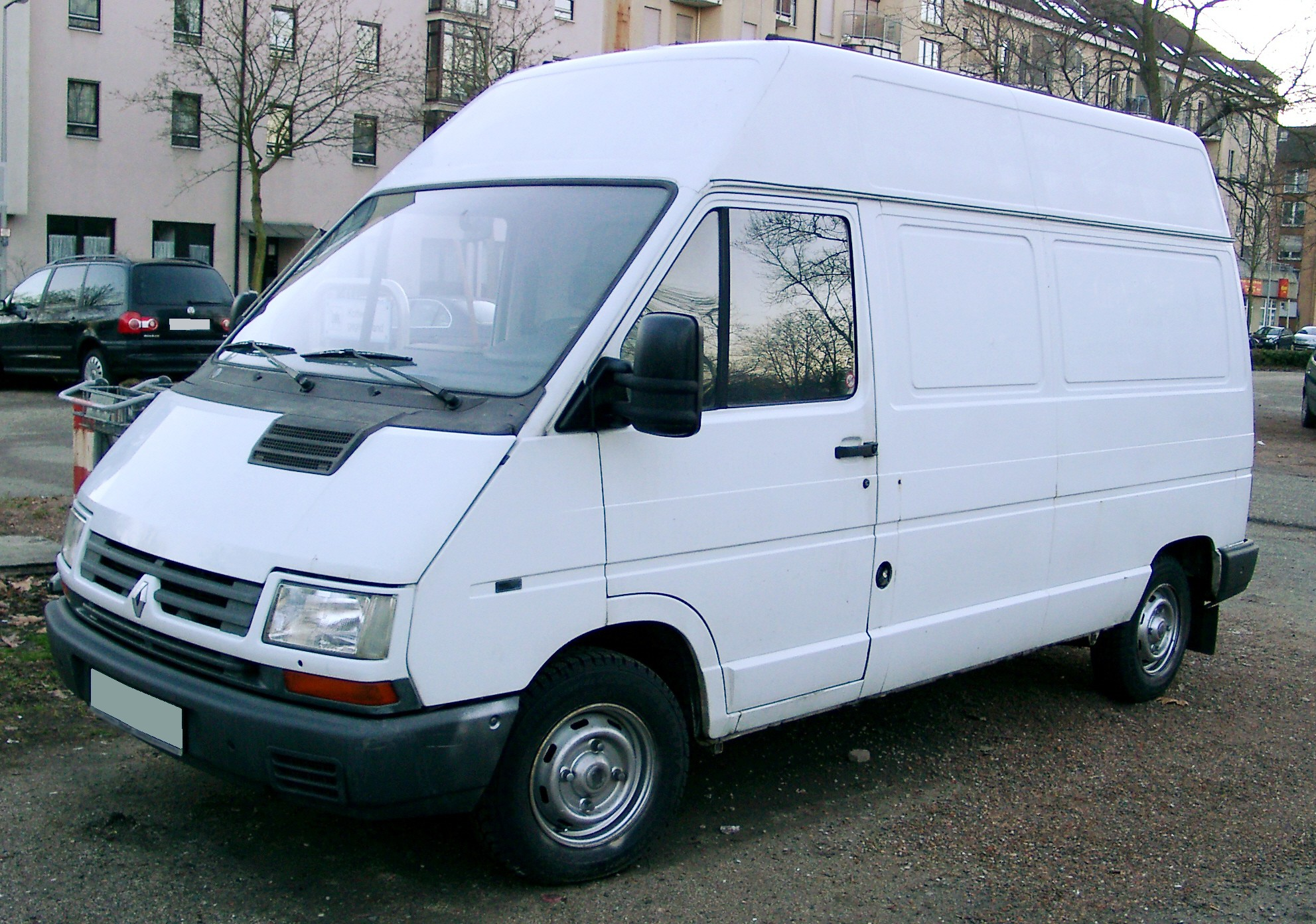
Renault Trafic first generation (second facelift) with high roof body

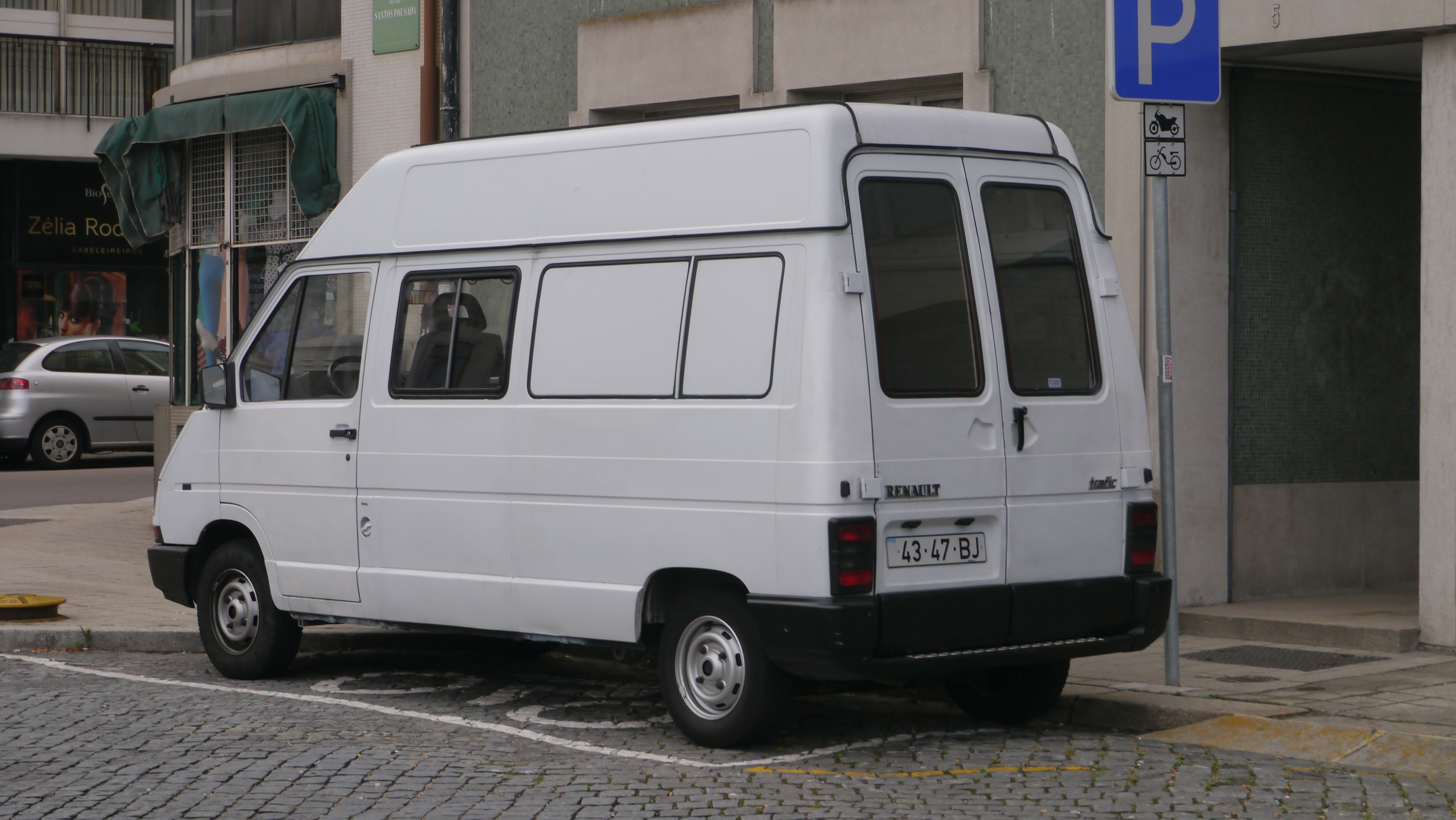
Renault Trafic first generation (second facelift) with high roof body

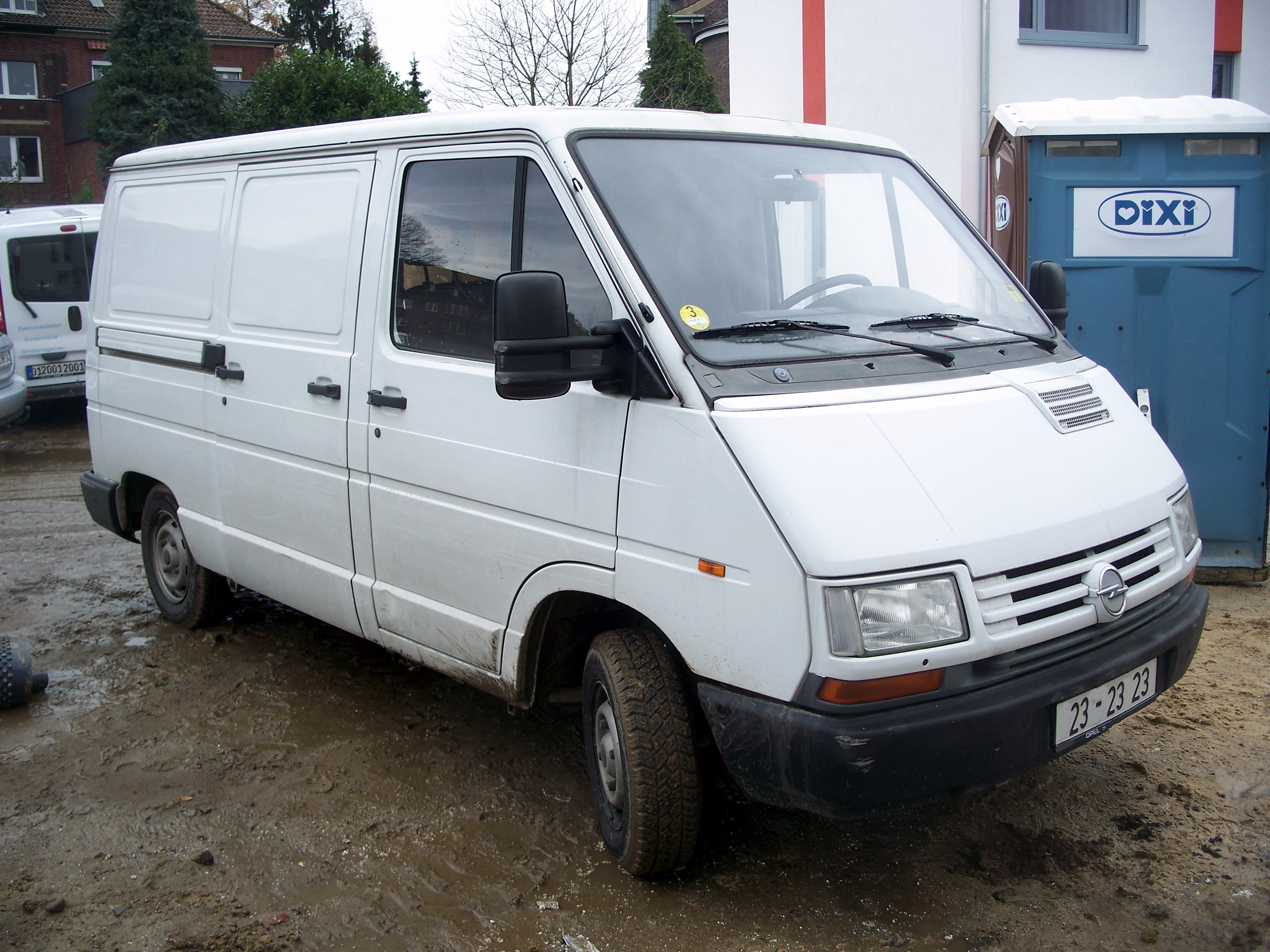
Opel Arena

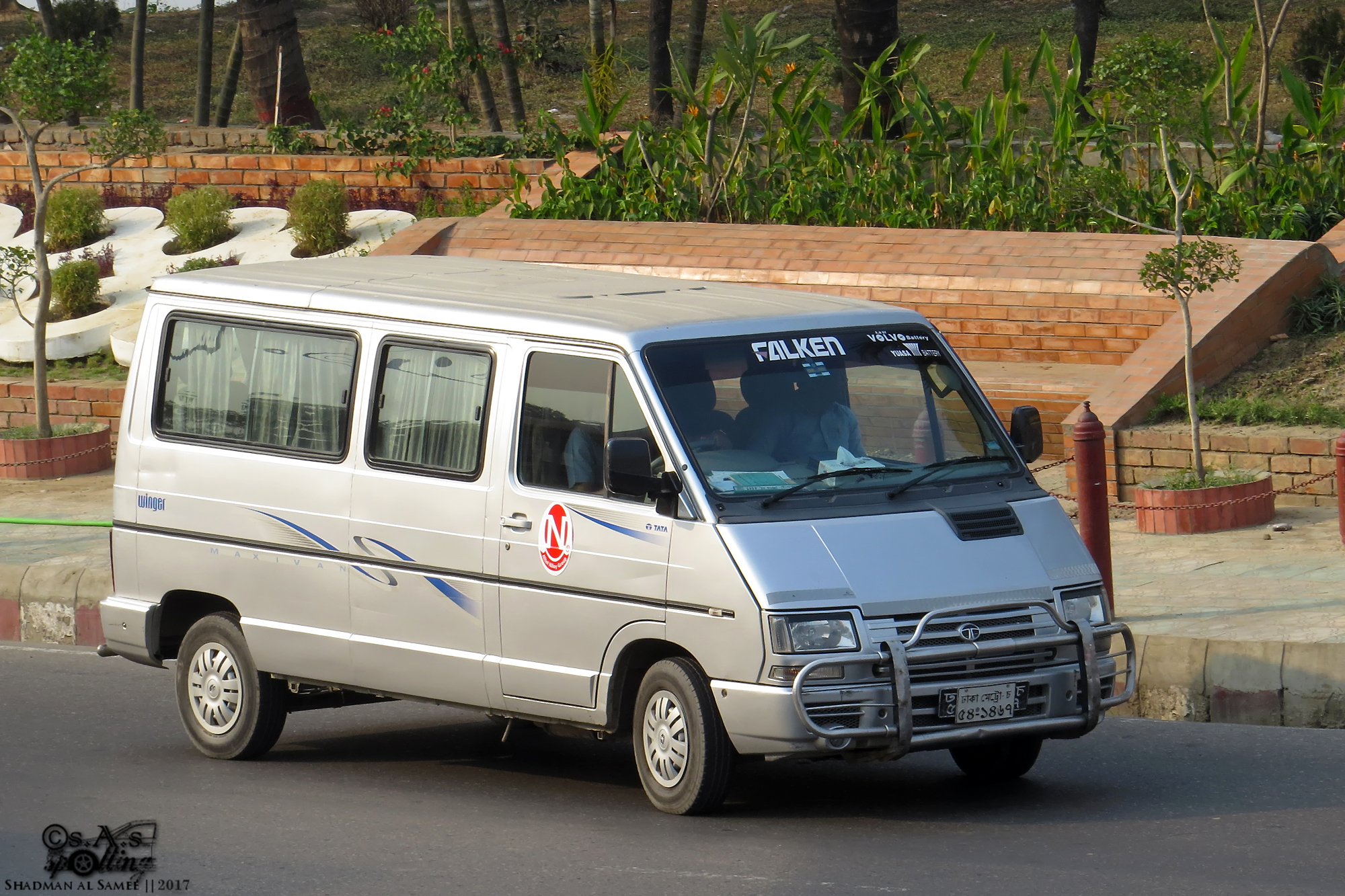
Tata Winger (2007–)

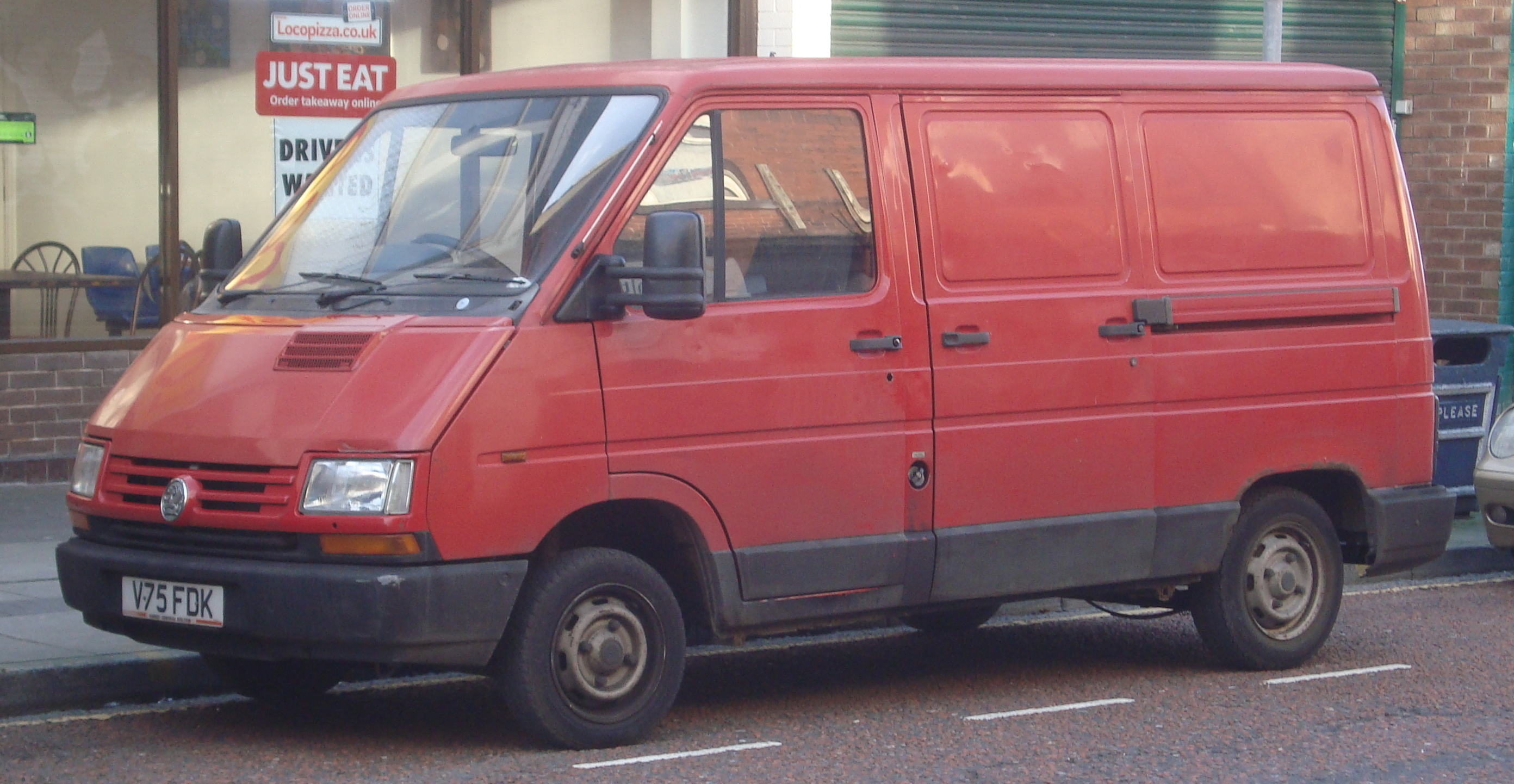
Vauxhall Arena

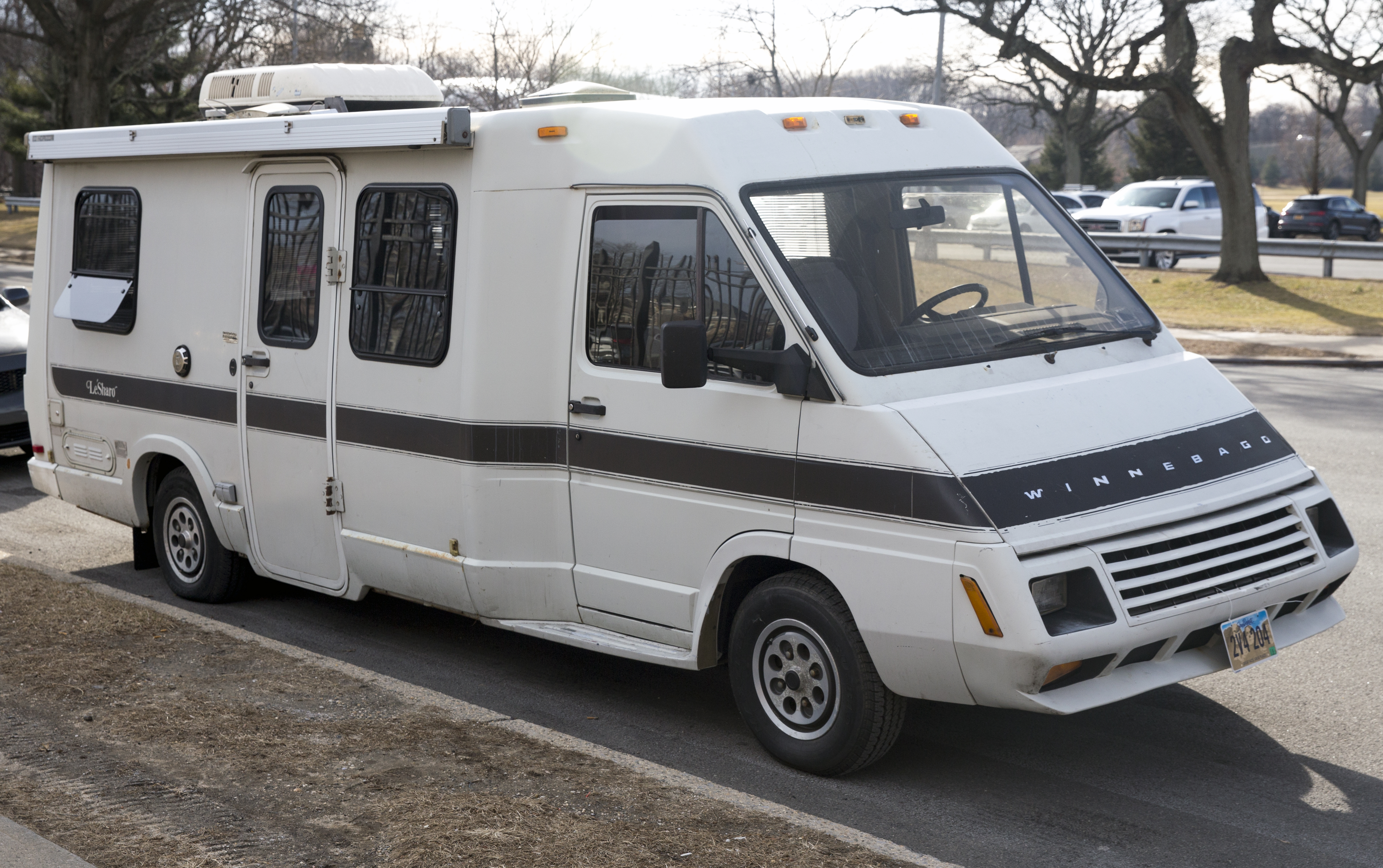
1988 Winnebago LeSharo

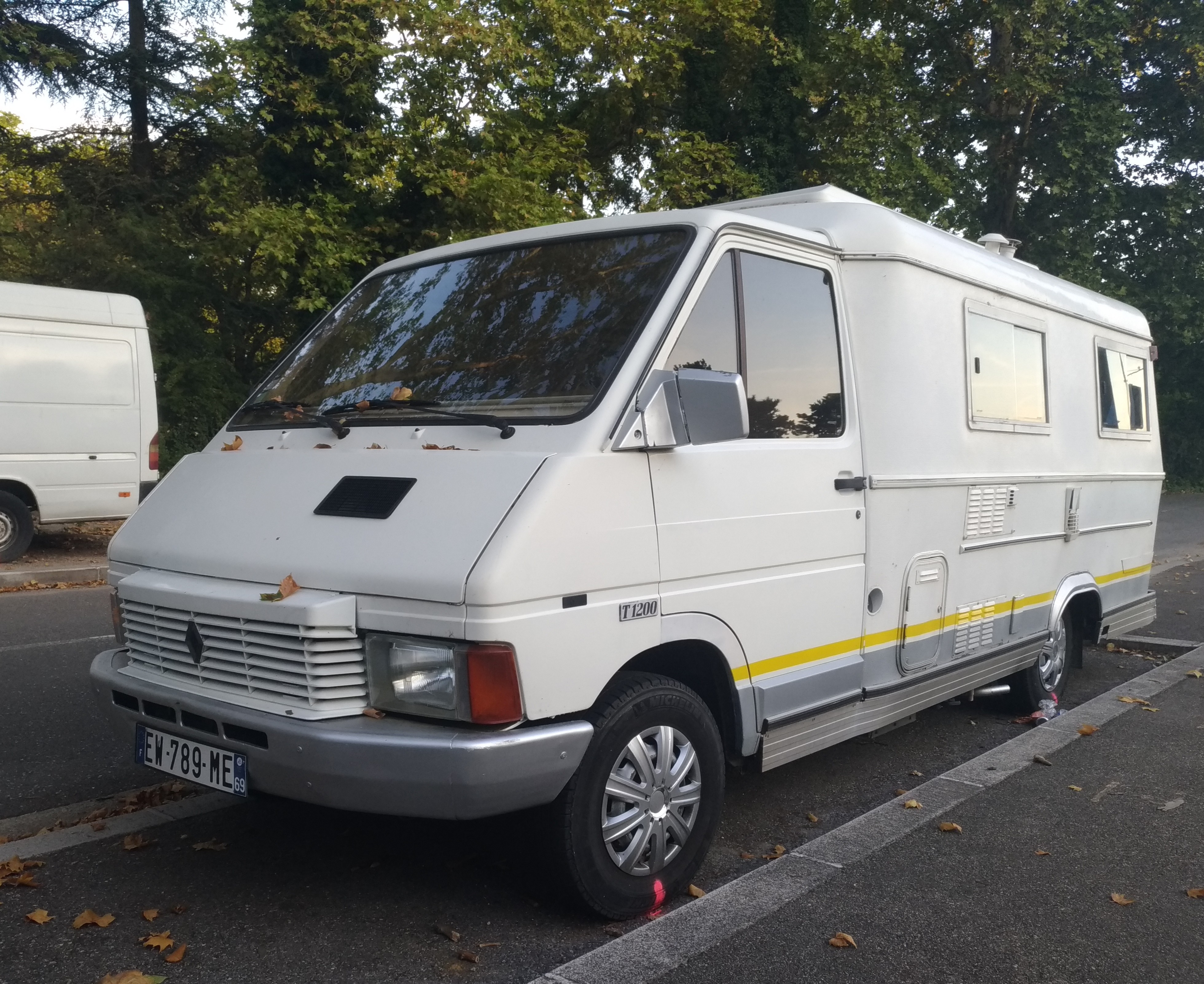
1984 Renault Trafic Camper

== Second generation (X83; 2001) ==
Second generation (X83)
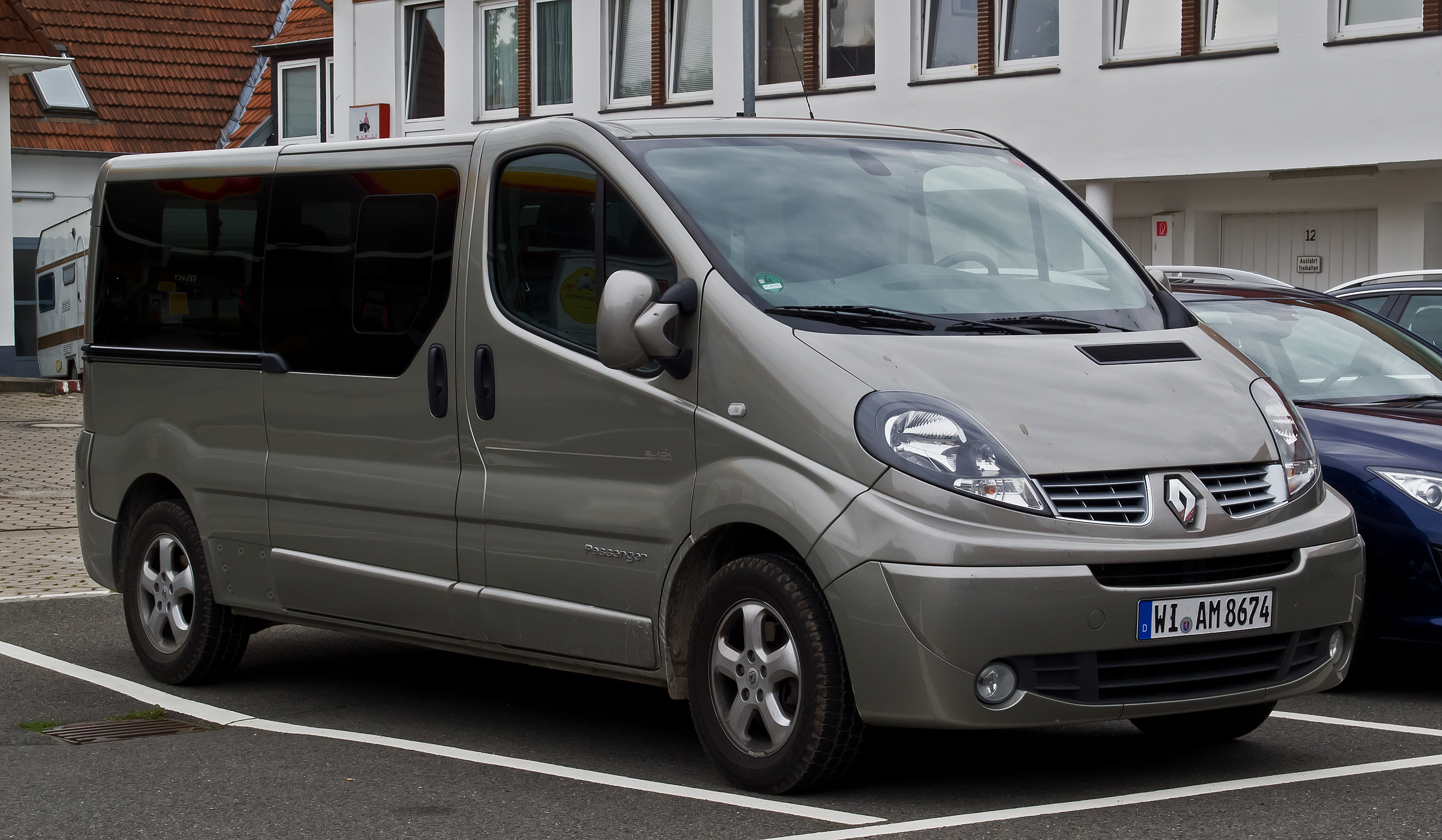

Overview
- Manufacturer: Nissan; General Motors
- Also called: Nissan Primastar; Opel/Vauxhall Vivaro
- Production: 2001–2015
- Assembly: United Kingdom: Luton (Vauxhall Luton); Spain: Barcelona (Nissan Motor Ibérica)

Body and chassis
- Class: Light commercial vehicle (M)
- Body style: 4-door van/minibus 2-door pickup truck

Powertrain
- Engine: petrol: 2.0 L F4R I4; diesel: 1.9 L F9Q I4; 2.0 L M9R I4; 2.5 L G9U I4
- Transmission: Manual; 6-speed PK5, PK6; Automatic; 6-speed Quickshift

Dimensions
- Wheelbase: SWB: 3,098 mm (122.0 in); LWB: 3,498 mm (137.7 in)
- Length: SWB: 4,782 mm (188.3 in); LWB: 5,182 mm (204.0 in); Regular Pickup: 5,038 mm (198.3 in); Crew Pickup: 5,438 mm (214.1 in)
- Width: 1,904 mm (75.0 in)
- Height: Crew Van: 1,380 mm (54.3 in); SWB: 2,497 mm (98.3 in) & 2,400 mm (94.5 in); LWB: 2,800 mm (110.2 in); Pickup Regular: 1,966 mm (77.4 in); Pickup Crew: 1,973 mm (77.7 in)

The second Trafic resulted from a joint venture between German Opel, Japanese Nissan, and French Renault. It is also sold as an Opel/Vauxhall Vivaro and Nissan Primastar.

Designed by Renault's corporate design department based within the company's Technocentre outside Paris, the Trafic was developed by the engineering team of Renault's light commercial vehicle unit at Villiers-Saint-Frédéric. Manufactured by GM Manufacturing Luton at its plant in Luton — beside Primastar and the Vivaro — the Trafic was the first Renault vehicle to be built in the United Kingdom in more than thirty years.

In an agreement between Renault and Nissan, versions of the van are also manufactured at Nissan's plant in Barcelona, Spain. In particular, high roof versions for Opel, Vauxhall, Renault, and Nissan are made in Barcelona because the Luton assembly plant has a low roof which cannot accommodate the extra height of the high roof.

The van exists in several versions, from a three seater with all the rear space available for loads, to a nine-seater, also known as a "Passenger van". Its name is based on the French word for "trade" or "traffic" (depending on the context). The van was designed by Renault in Paris, and both Renault-Nissan and Opel/Vauxhall versions are manufactured by Opel/Vauxhall at their plant in Luton. In 2012, production of the Vauxhall Vivaro totalled 36,982 and 16,483 for the Renault Trafic.

A mild facelift in October 2006 had the orange indicators swapped for clear ones, which were more integrated into the headlamp housings. On the Opel/Vauxhall model, the indicators moved from the front bumpers, up into the headlamp housings, thus looking more similar to the Renault one. Production ended in June 2015.

=== Gallery ===
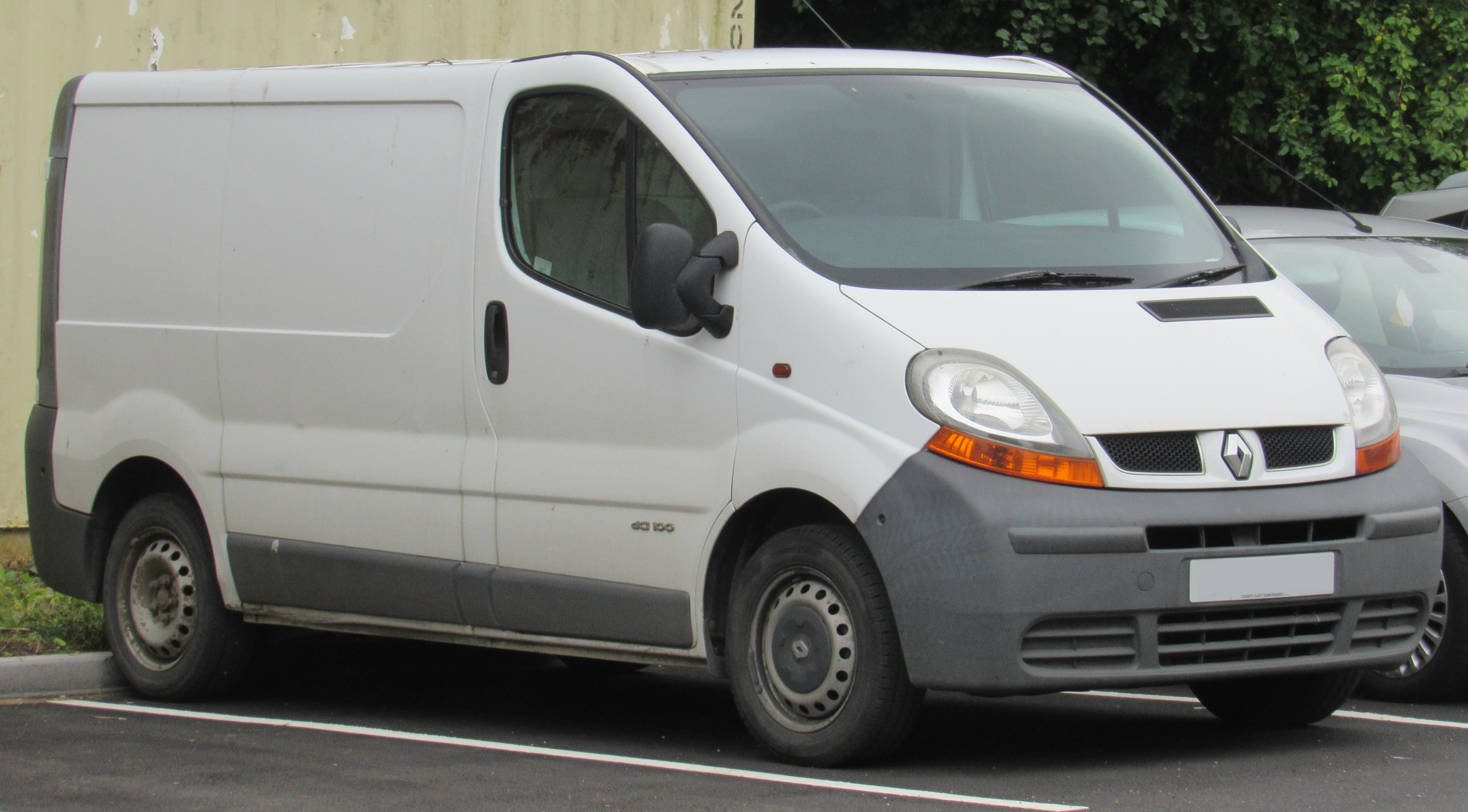
Renault Trafic second generation (before facelift)

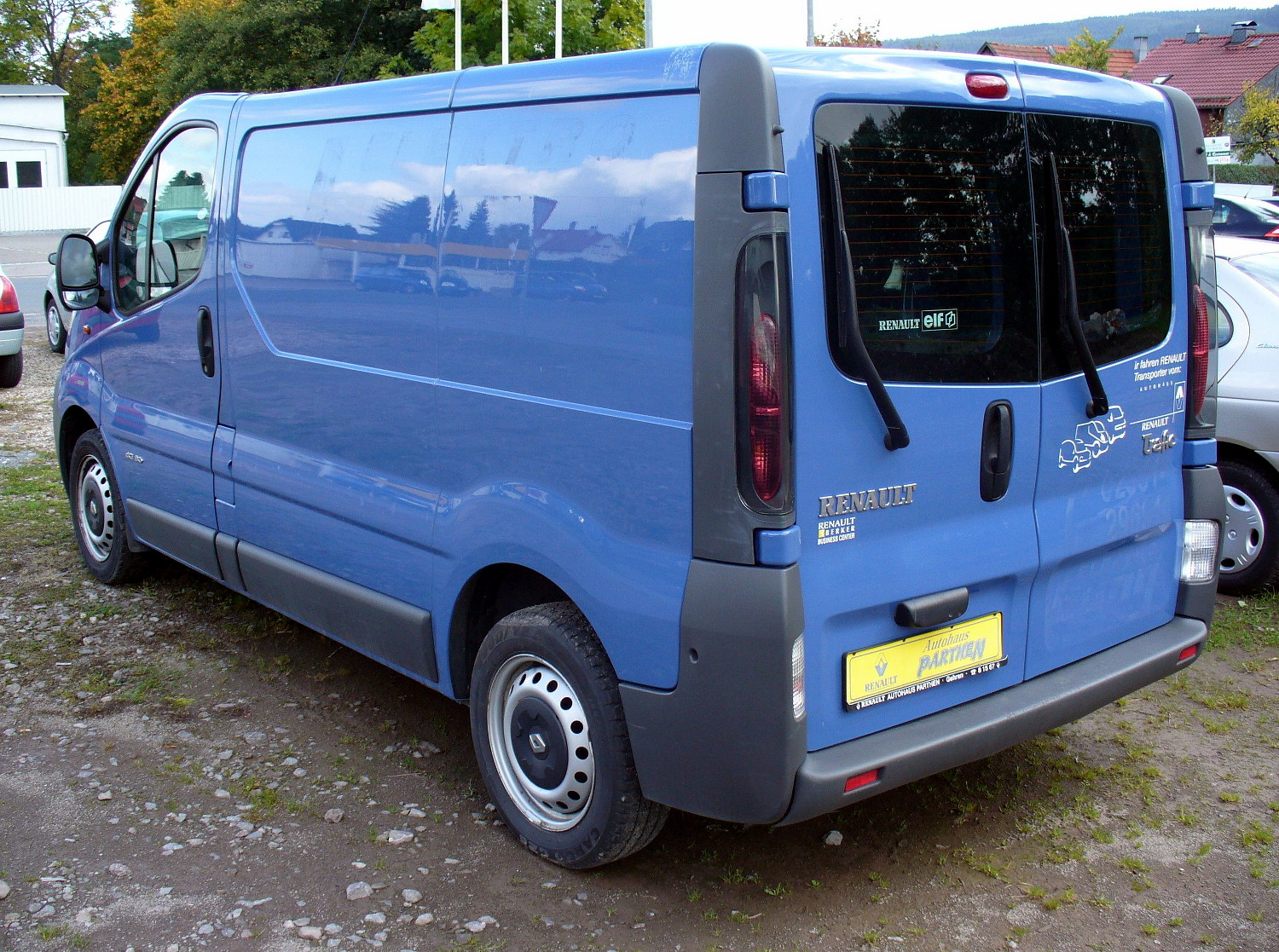
Renault Trafic second generation (before facelift)

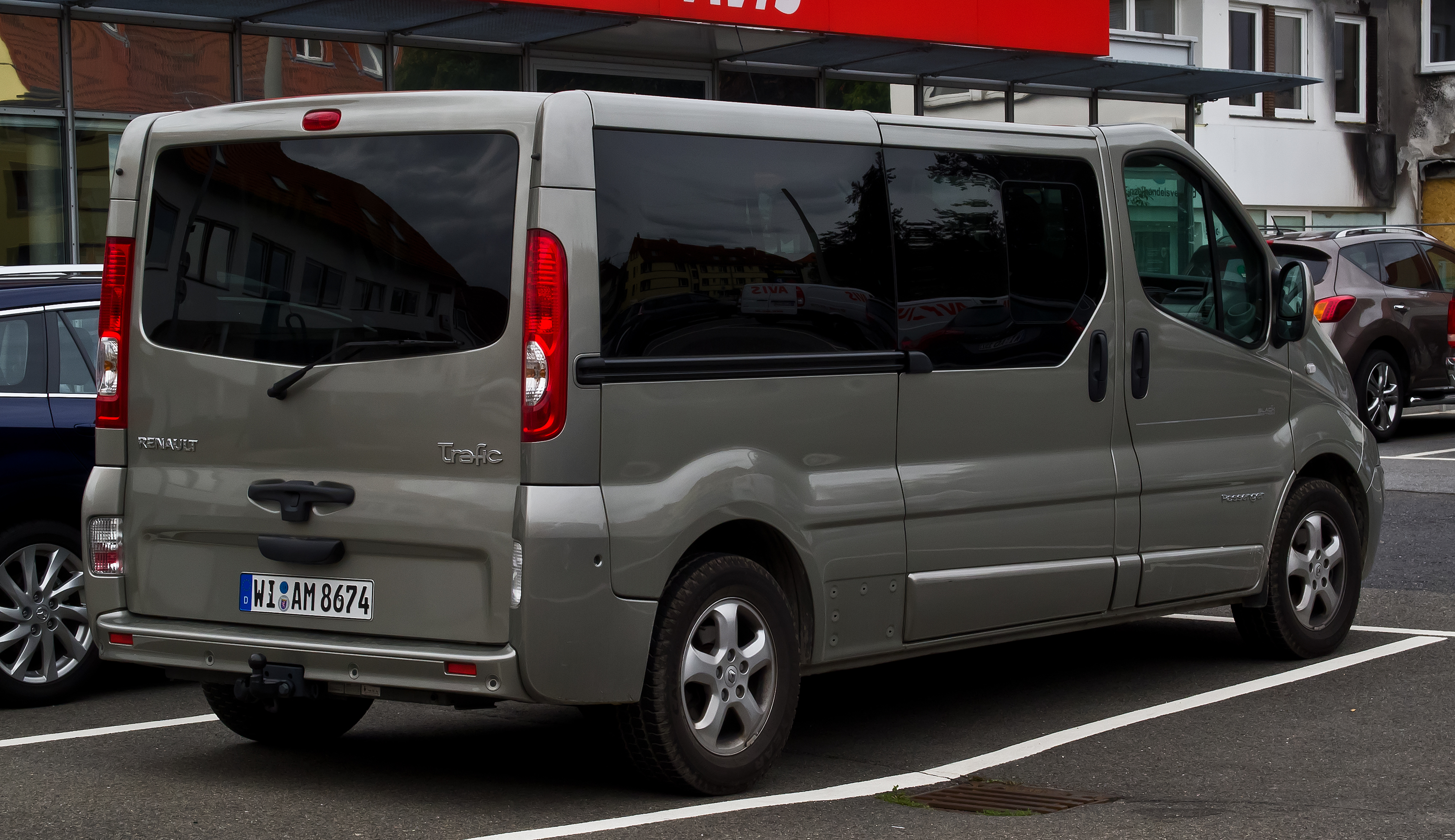
Renault Trafic second generation (phase 2 facelift)

=== Nissan Primastar ===
The Nissan Primastar was also launched in 2001, and is available in panel van, combi, bus, and chassis cab configurations. Two wheelbases and two roof heights are available, as well as three diesel engines and a petrol one. In the end of 2014, the last Primastar rolled off the production line. It was replaced by the NV300 in September 2016.

==== Gallery ====
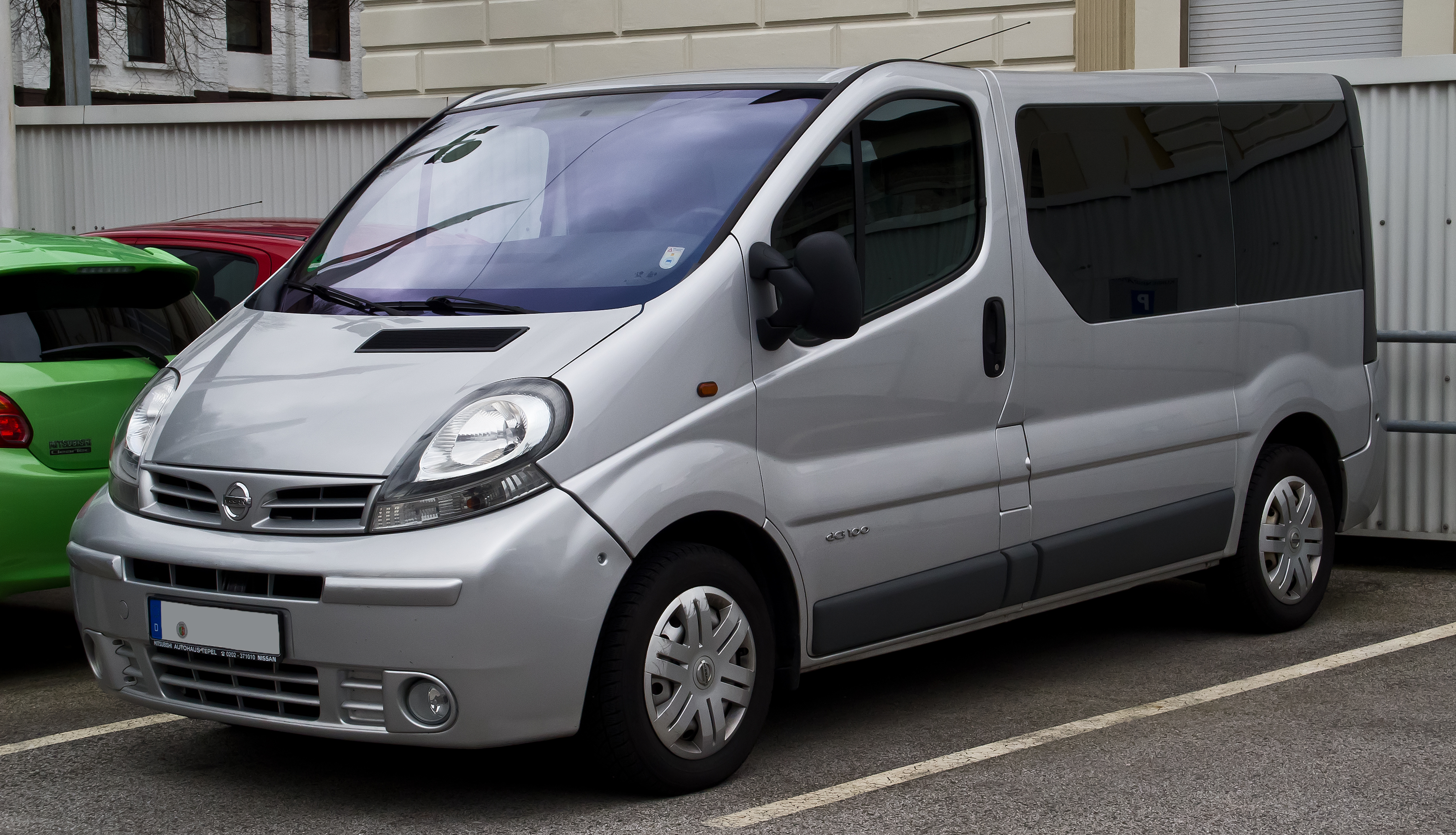
Nissan Primastar with options including colour coded bumpers

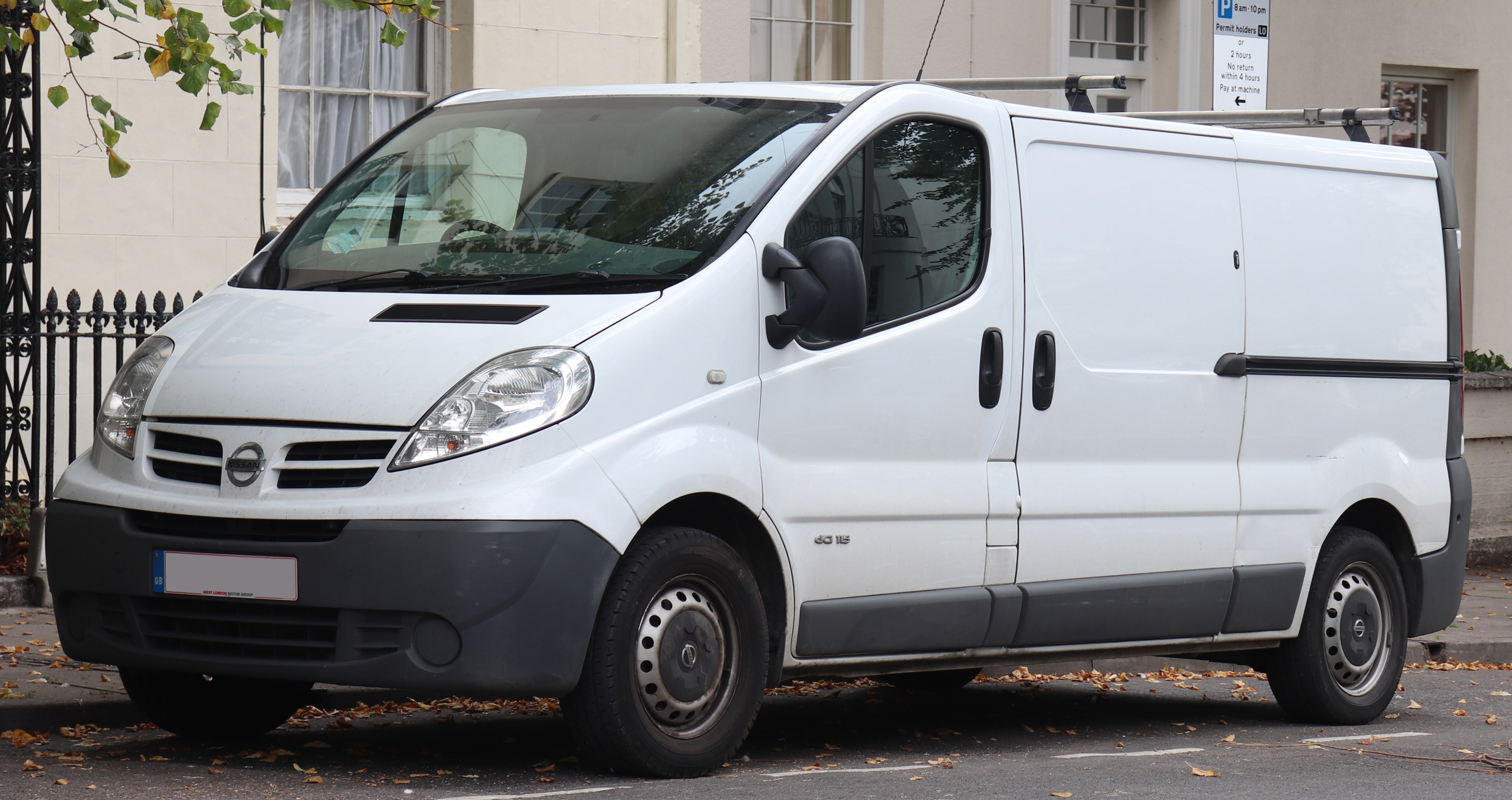
Nissan Primastar, after facelift — note revised indicator lights

=== Opel Vivaro A ===
The Opel Vivaro from the German automaker Opel was launched in September 2001. While the Vivaro is sold as an Opel in most European markets, in the United Kingdom it was sold as a Vauxhall. The Vivaro is primarily manufactured at GM Manufacturing Luton (previously IBC) in Luton, England and by Nissan at their Zona Franca (Barcelona) facility in Spain.

The Vivaro is available in panel van, minibus, combined bus/van, and platform crew cab configurations. Two different wheelbase styles, and two roof height options are also available, as well as three diesel engine power options and a petrol engine.

The vehicle was given a mild facelift in 2006, during which the front indicators were moved from the front bumper, up into the headlight housing and only a 2.0 L four cylinder diesel engine is available in two states of tune; a 90 PS (66 kW; 89 bhp) or 115 PS (85 kW; 113 bhp) mated to a six speed manual or optional automatic transmission.

The Vivaro e Concept debuted September 2010 at the IAA Commercial Vehicle Show in Hanover, Germany. It is plug in hybrid vehicle, with an extended range up to 250 mi (402 km) and includes 21 kWh lithium ion batteries enabling over 60 mi (97 km) of pure electric driving range.

==== Gallery ====
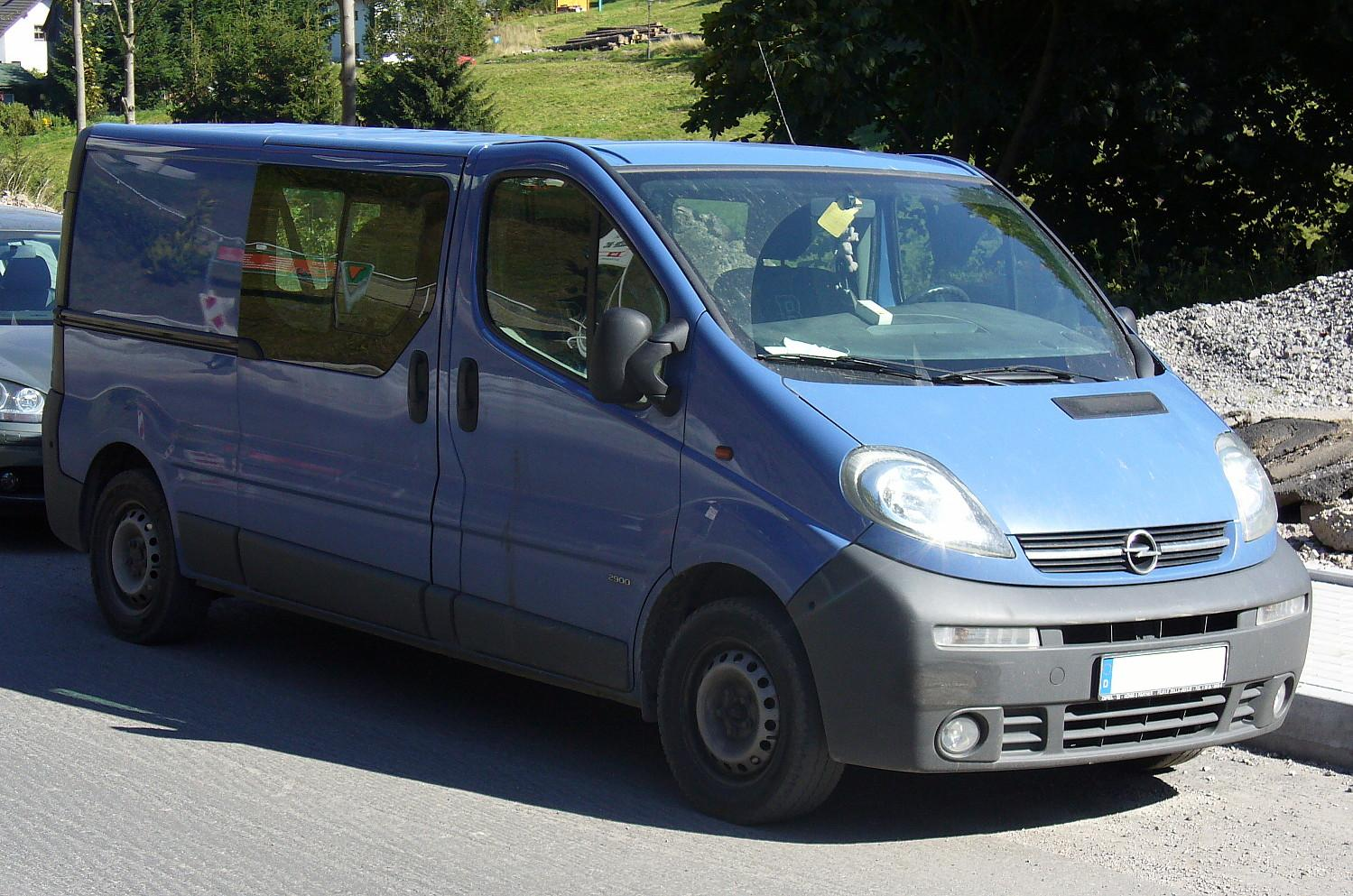
Pre-facelift Opel Vivaro (2001–2006)

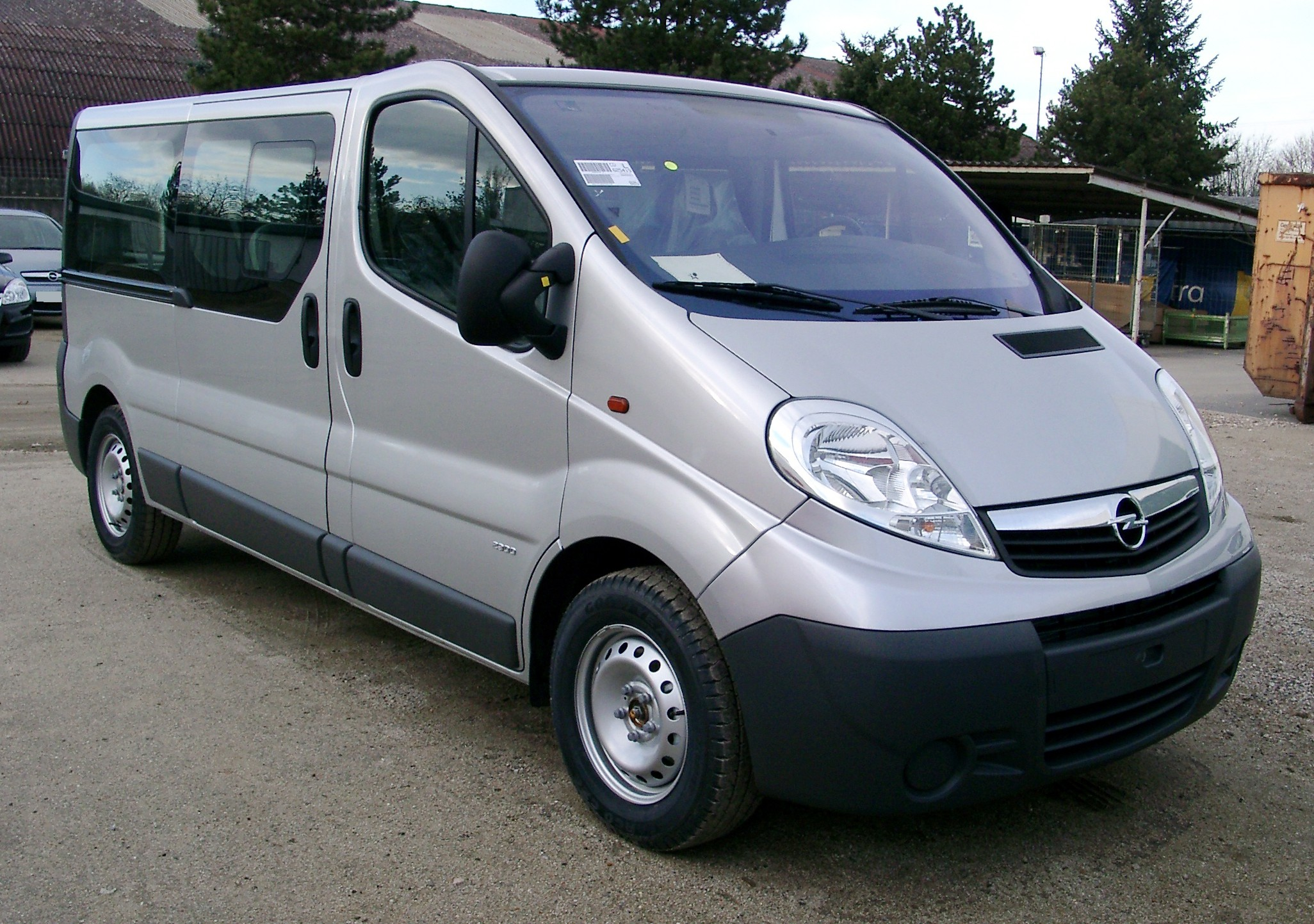
Facelift Opel Vivaro (2006–2015)

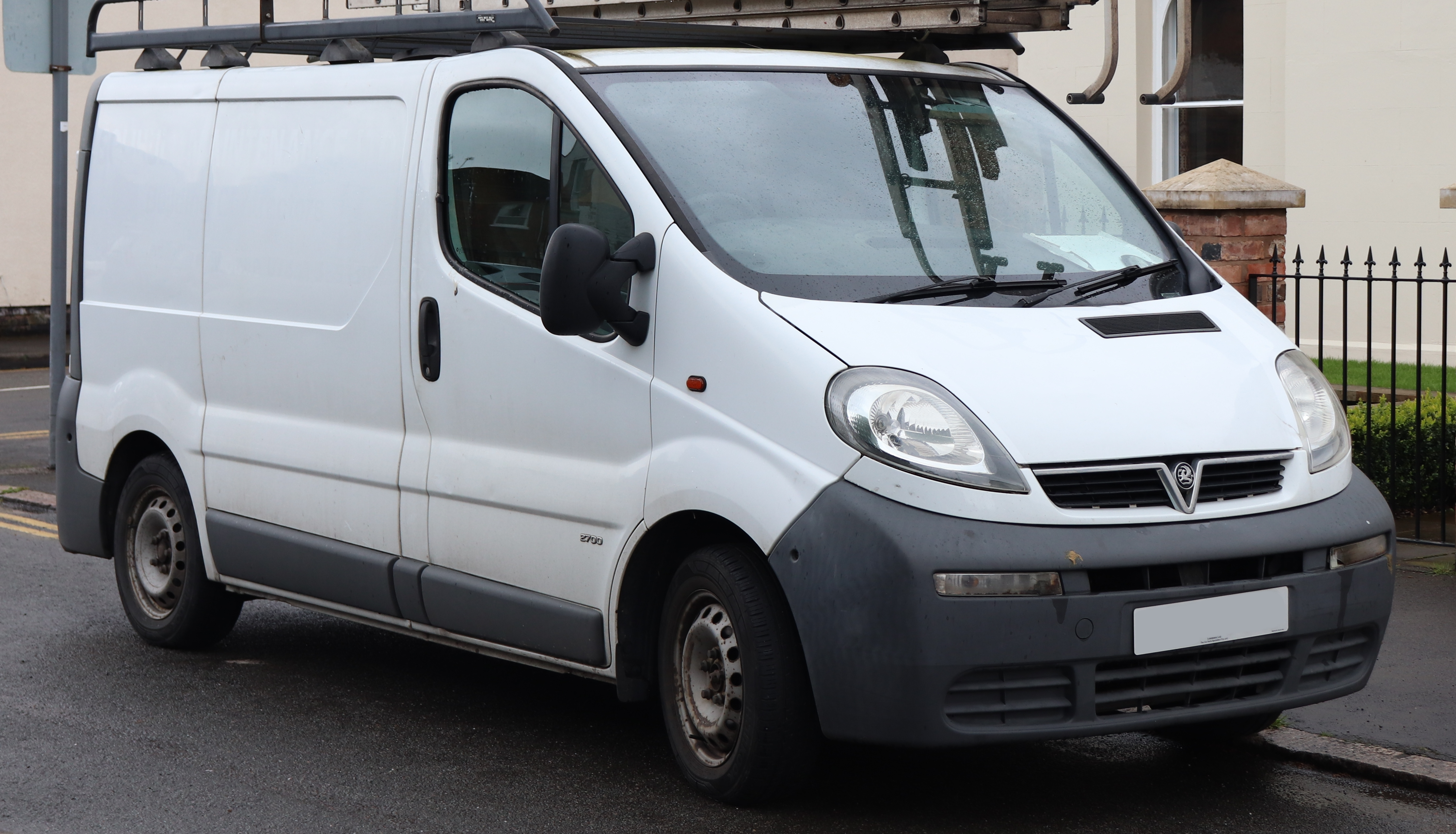
Pre-facelift Vauxhall Vivaro (2004)

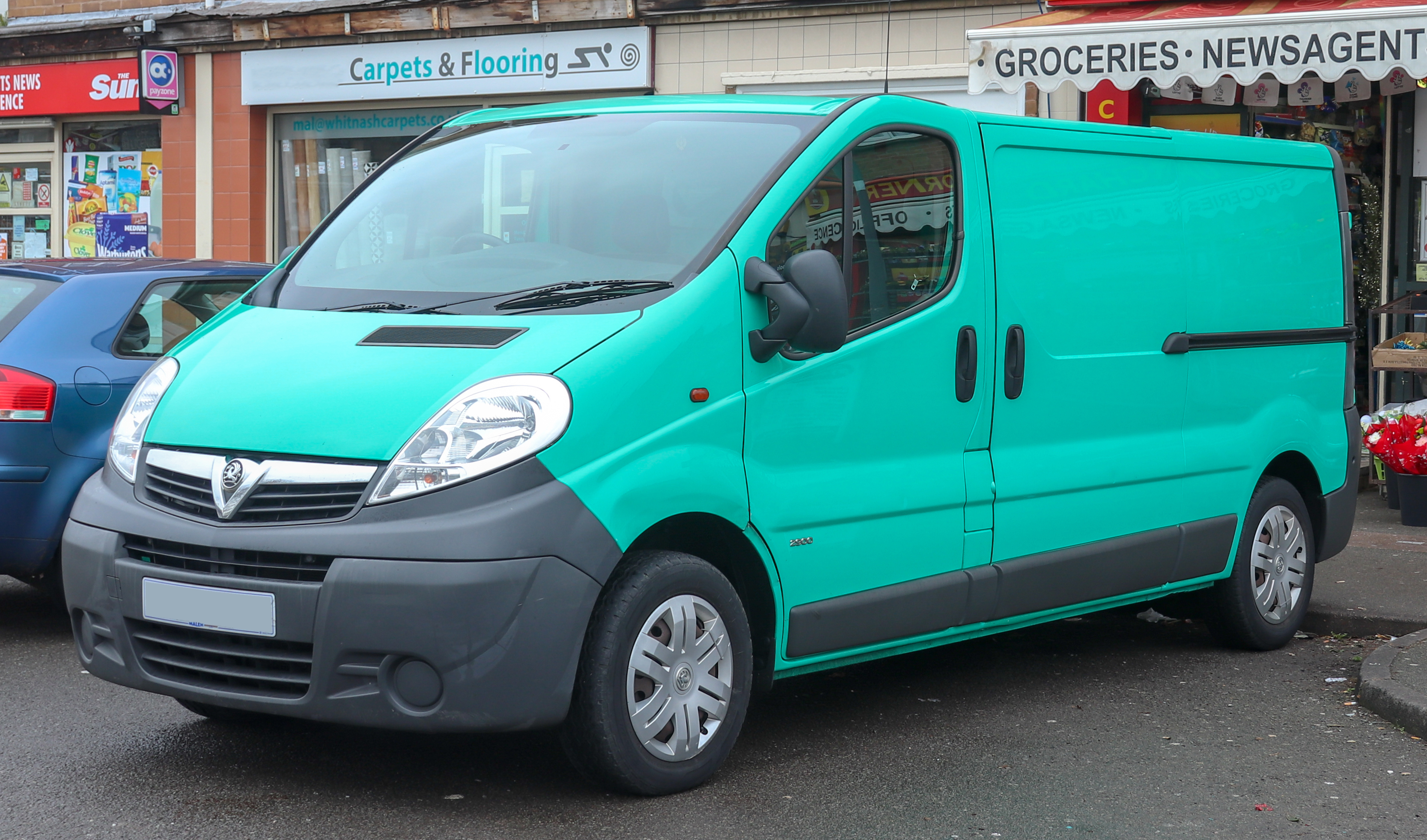
Facelift Vauxhall Vivaro (2012)

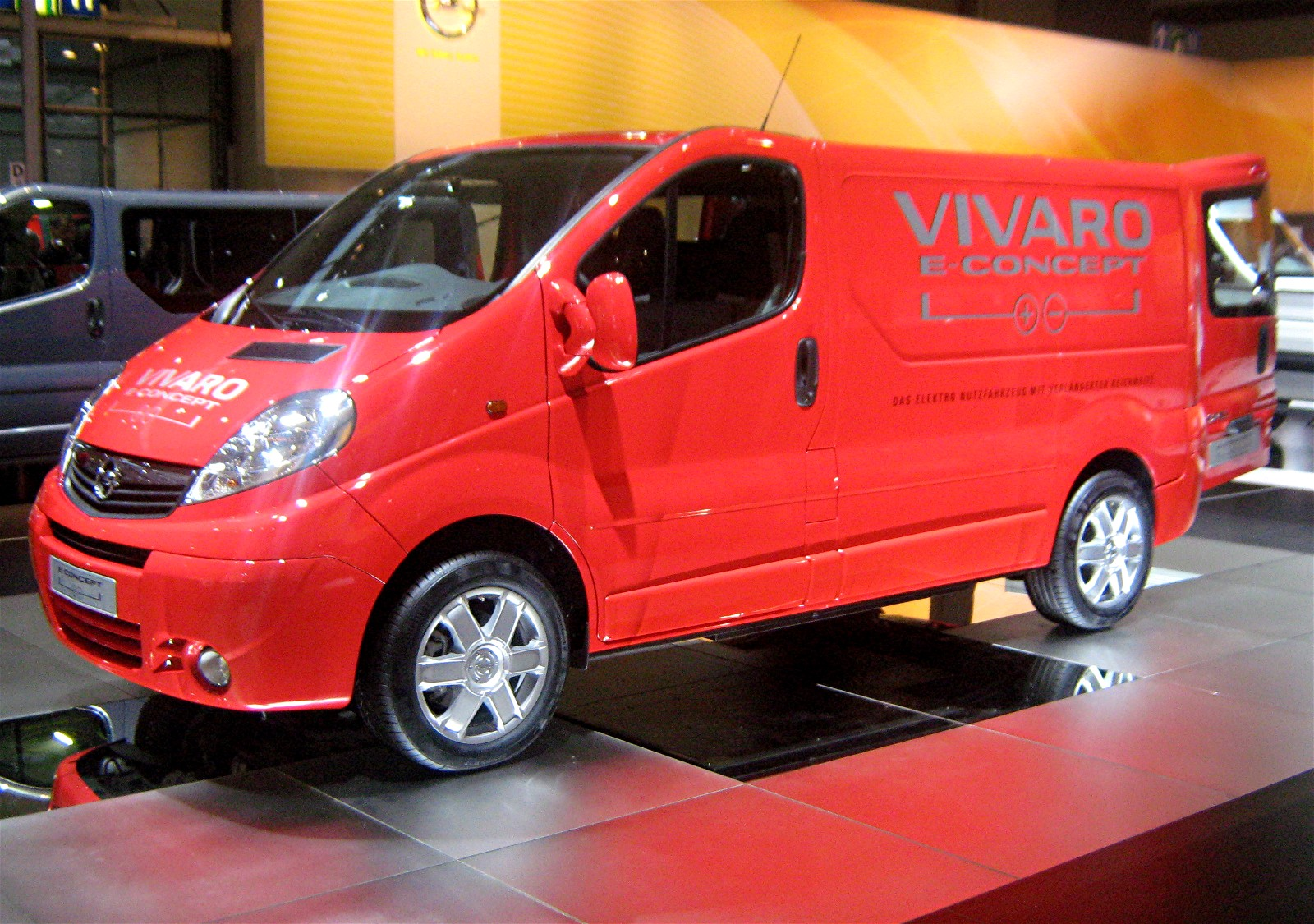
Opel Vivaro E-Concept (2009)

=== Engines ===
Petrol engines
Model	Engine type	Power	Torque
2.0	1,997 cc (122 cu in) I4 NA	120 PS (88 kW; 118 hp)	190 N⋅m (140 lb⋅ft)
Diesel engines
Model	Engine type	Power	Torque
1.9 dCi	1,870 cc (114 cu in) I4 turbo	80 PS (59 kW; 79 hp)	190 N⋅m (140 lb⋅ft)
1.9 dCi	1,870 cc (114 cu in) I4 turbo	100 PS (74 kW; 99 hp)	240 N⋅m (177 lb⋅ft)
2.0 dCi	1,995 cc (122 cu in) I4 turbo	90 PS (66 kW; 89 hp)	242 N⋅m (178 lb⋅ft)
2.0 dCi	1,995 cc (122 cu in) I4 turbo	115 PS (85 kW; 113 hp)	290 N⋅m (214 lb⋅ft)
2.5 dCi	2,464 cc (150 cu in) I4 turbo	150 PS (110 kW; 148 hp)	320 N⋅m (236 lb⋅ft)

== Third generation (X82; 2014) ==
Third generation (X82)
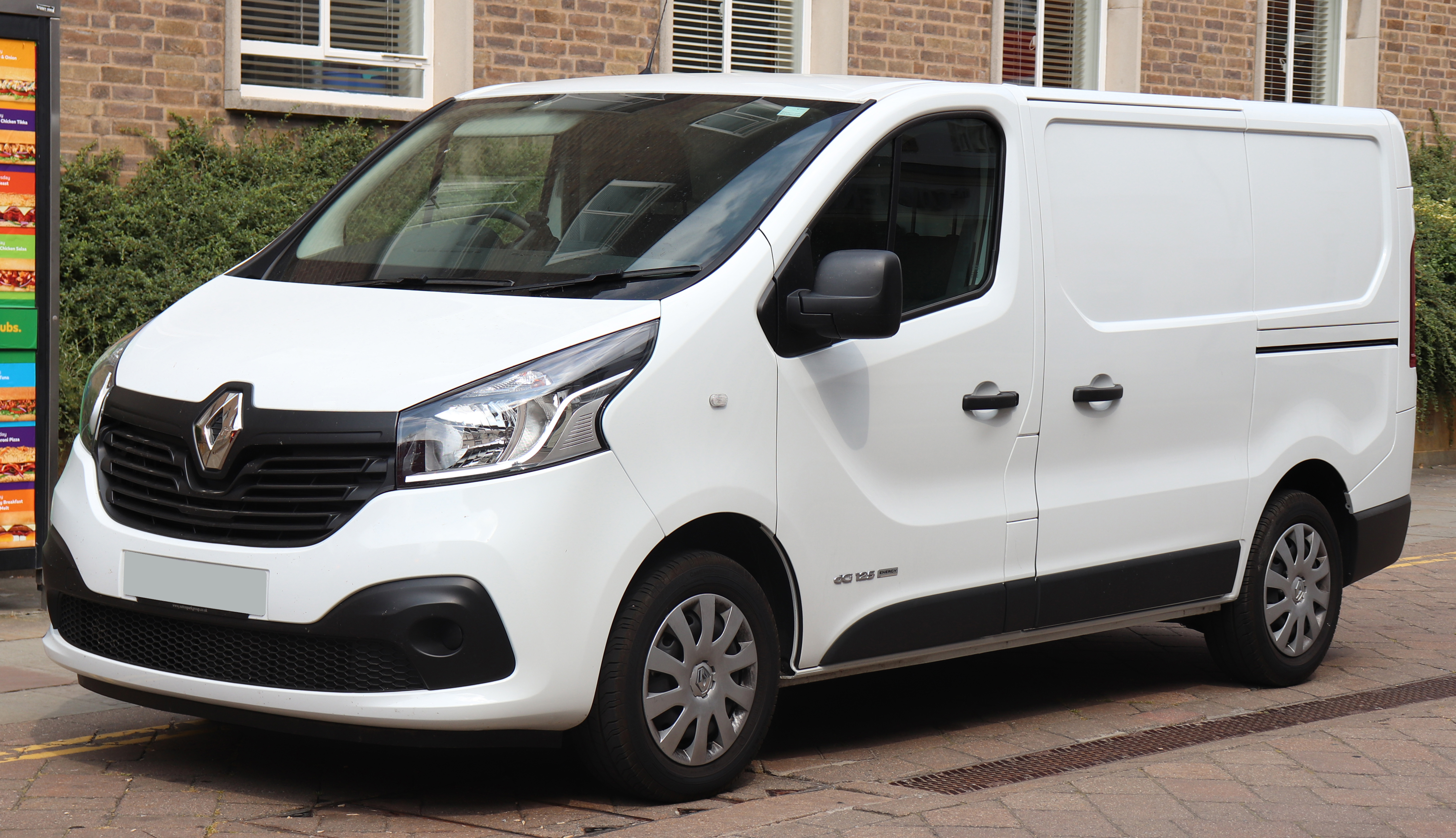

Overview
- Manufacturer: Renault; General Motors (2014–2017); Groupe PSA (2017–2019)
- Also called: Fiat Talento (2016–2020); Nissan NV300 (2016–2021); Nissan Primastar (2022–present); Opel Vivaro (2014–2019); Vauxhall Vivaro (2014–2019); Mitsubishi Express (Australia and New Zealand, 2020–2022); Renault Trucks Trafic (2022–present)
- Production: 2014–present
- Assembly: France: Sandouville (Sandouville Renault Factory); United Kingdom: Luton (Vauxhall Luton, low-roof right-hand drive models, 2014–2019)

Body and chassis
- Class: Light commercial vehicle
- Body style: 4-door van/minibus

Powertrain
- Engine: diesel 1.6 L R9M I4 (2014-2019); 2.0 L M9R I4 (2019-present)
- Transmission: Manual; 6-speed Automatic; 6-speed EDC; 9-speed EDC

Chronology
- Successor: Renault FlexEVan (for Trafic Van E-Tech)

Renault released a new generation Trafic in September 2014. It was again rebadged and sold as the Opel Vivaro in Europe and Vauxhall Vivaro in the UK. Styling was updated for the 2019 model year and again for the 2021 model year, then in 2024 with the new Renault and Nissan logos.

Two lower power variants (95 PS and 115 PS) use a variable geometry turbocharger, while the highest output (125 PS and 145 PS) variant employs a twin turbocharger arrangement; other features include variable output water and oil pumps and a maintenance free timing chain.

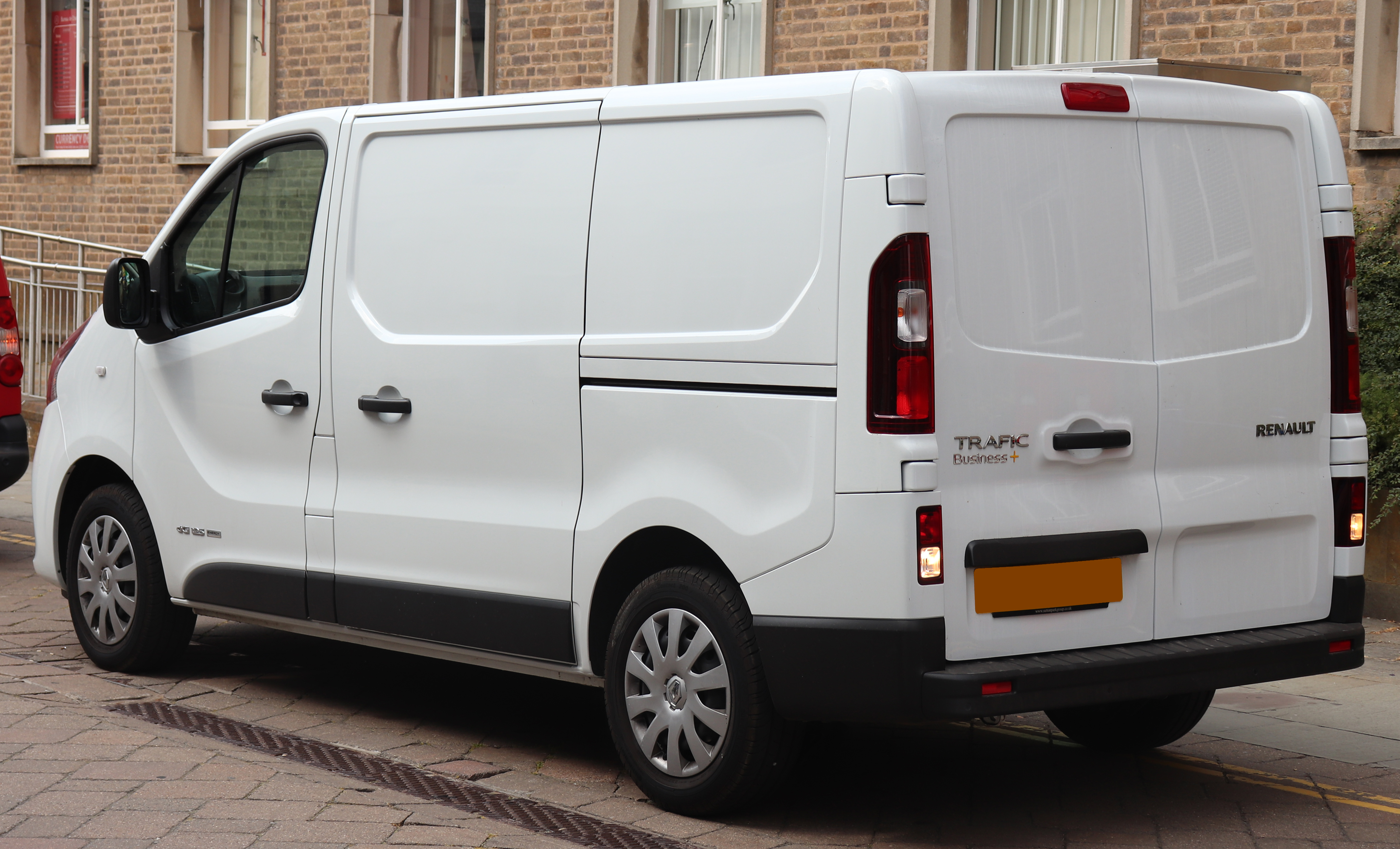
Pre-facelift Renault Trafic

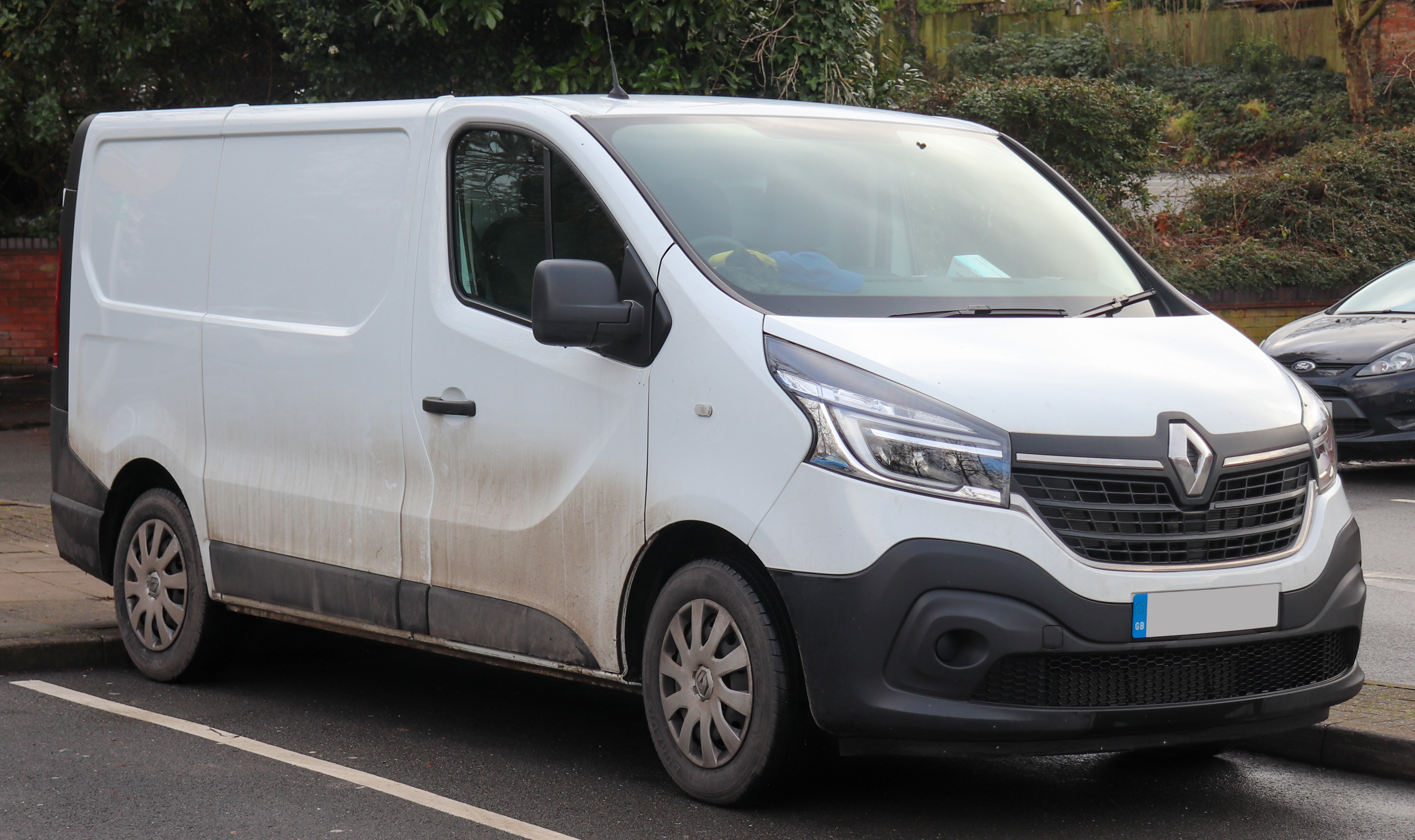
First facelift Renault Trafic

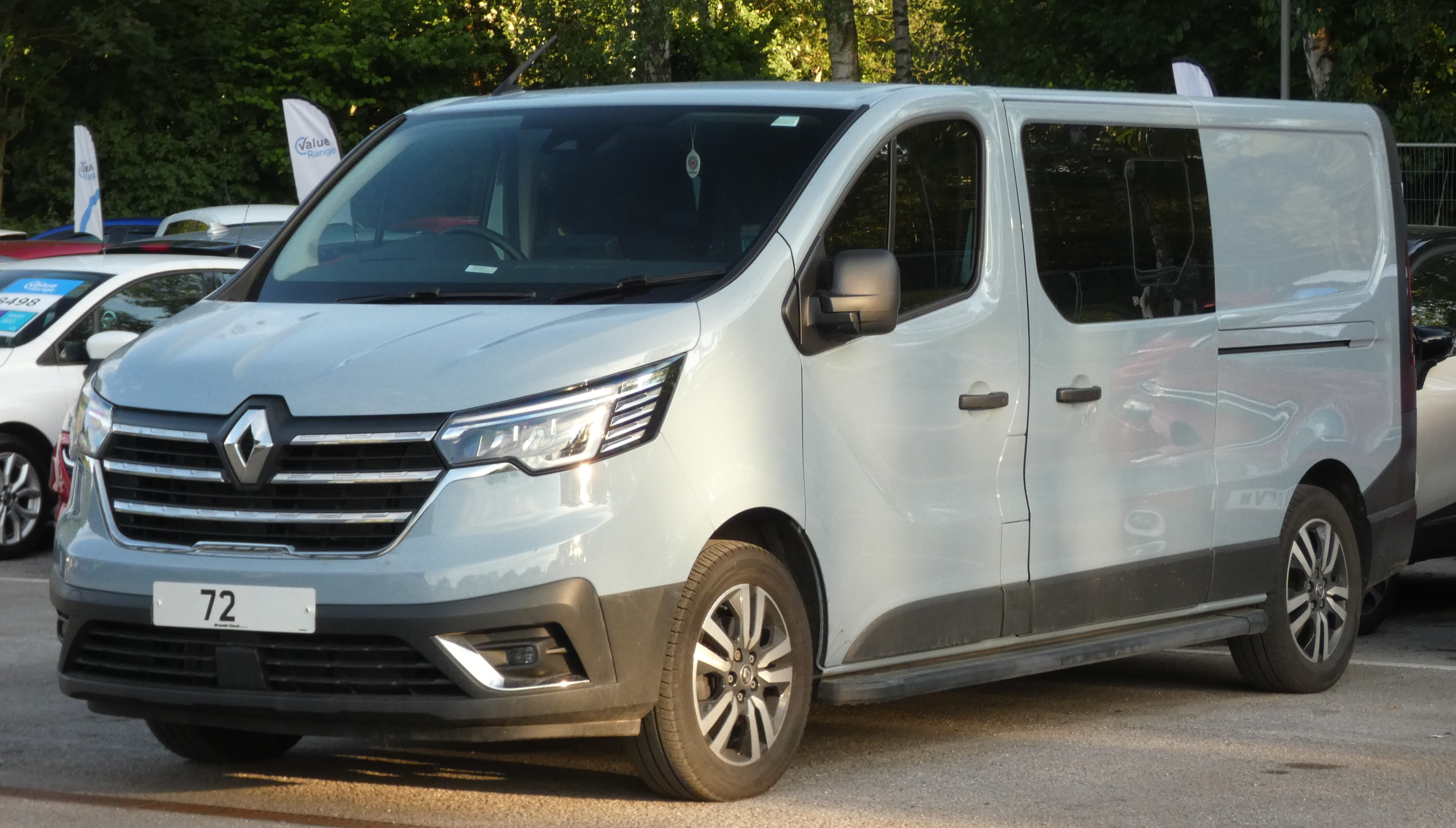
Second facelift Renault Trafic

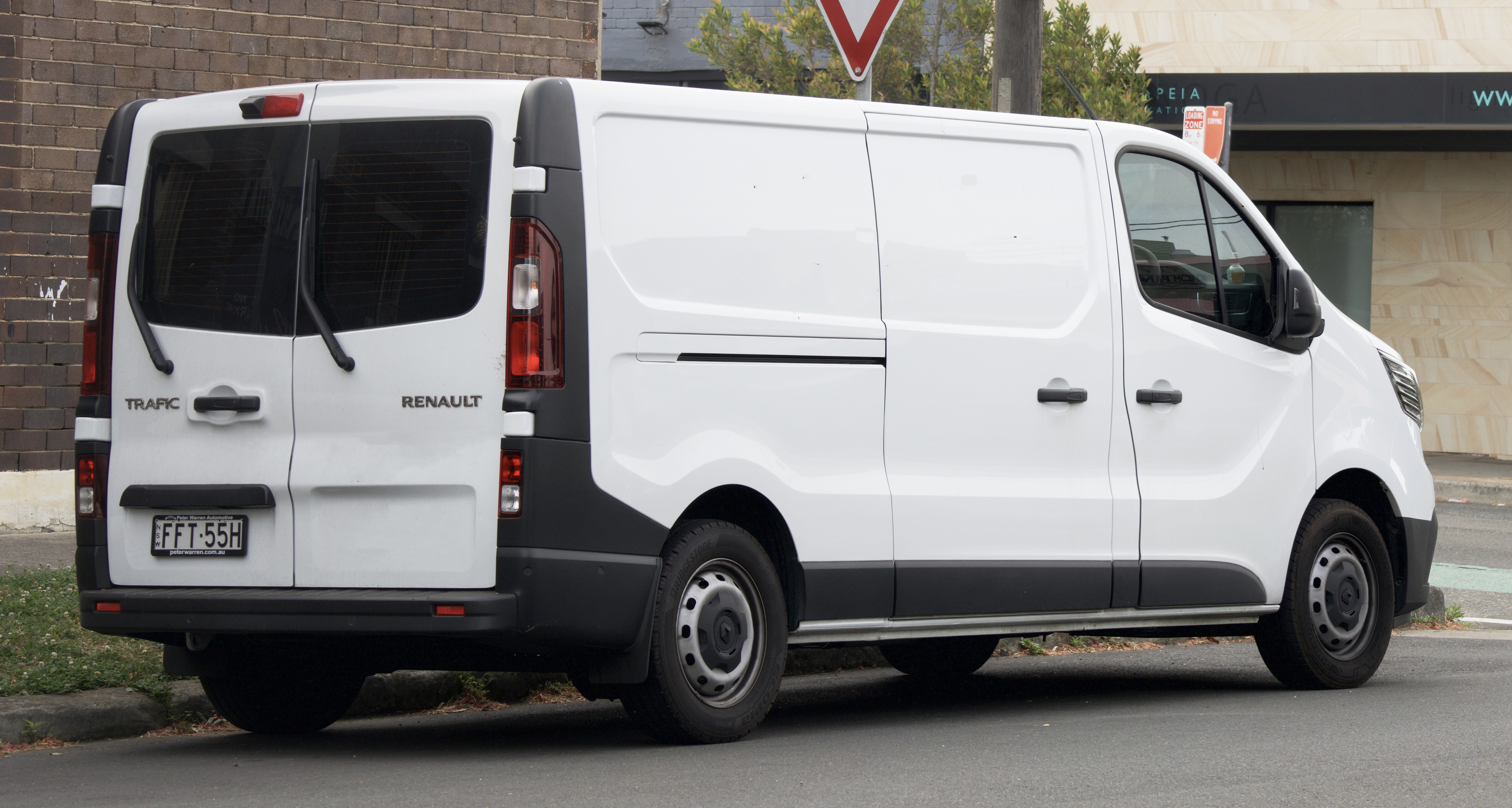
Second facelift Renault Trafic

=== Rebadged variants ===
Opel/Vauxhall Vivaro variants for the United Kingdom and mainland Europe were manufactured at GM Manufacturing Luton and at Sandouville, except for the high roof variants and the left-hand drive variants, which were manufactured at Sandouville. The new Vivaro dropped the previous larger capacity diesel engines, in favour of a 1.6 Energy dCi (Renault/Renault Trucks/Nissan/)/CDTI (Opel/Vauxhall)/MultiJet (Fiat)/Di-D (Mitsubishi) engine. From 2016, Vauxhall Vivaro models gained a Made In Britain badge at the rear. The Opel/Vauxhall Vivaro went out of production in 2019, when Opel/Vauxhall was acquired by Groupe PSA; it was replaced by a new generation Vivaro which was a rebadged Citroën Jumpy.

Renault–Nissan Alliance partner Nissan sold a rebadged Trafic II (X83) as the Primastar. The Primastar was renamed to the NV300 for 2016 and moved to the Trafic III (X82). The light commercial vehicle variant of the NV300 reverted to using the Primastar nameplate in 2021.

In July 2016, Fiat introduced a rebadged Trafic, called Talento to replace its Scudo, which had been a rebadged Citroën Jumpy. In October 2019, all of the vans were given a facelift which introduced a new 2.0-litre EcoJet diesel engine which is 11 percent more fuel efficient than the older 1.6 litre and variable-geometry turbocharger for smoother engine performance at low speeds. Small exterior changes include revised front bumper and black plastic wing mirrors instead of painted ones. Interior received an updated steering wheel, textured crash pads on the dashboard, new choice of interior trims and 7-inch touchscreen infotainment system with Apple CarPlay and Android Auto supported. In September 2020, Renault announced it would stop supplying Talentos to Fiat, as Fiat Chrysler had declared plans to merge with Renault's rival Groupe PSA to form Stellantis. The Talento was replaced by a new Scudo/Ulysses, which was again a rebadged Jumpy.

In 2020, the Trafic was rebadged and introduced as the third-generation Mitsubishi Express for Australia, and as a replacement for the former L300 in the New Zealand market. It was discontinued two years later. The existing Renault Trafic has also been sold in these markets since 2014.

In 2022, Renault starts to supply the Trafic to Renault Trucks (company owned by Volvo AB) to sell Trafics on its dealerships using the Renault Trucks badging.

==== Gallery ====
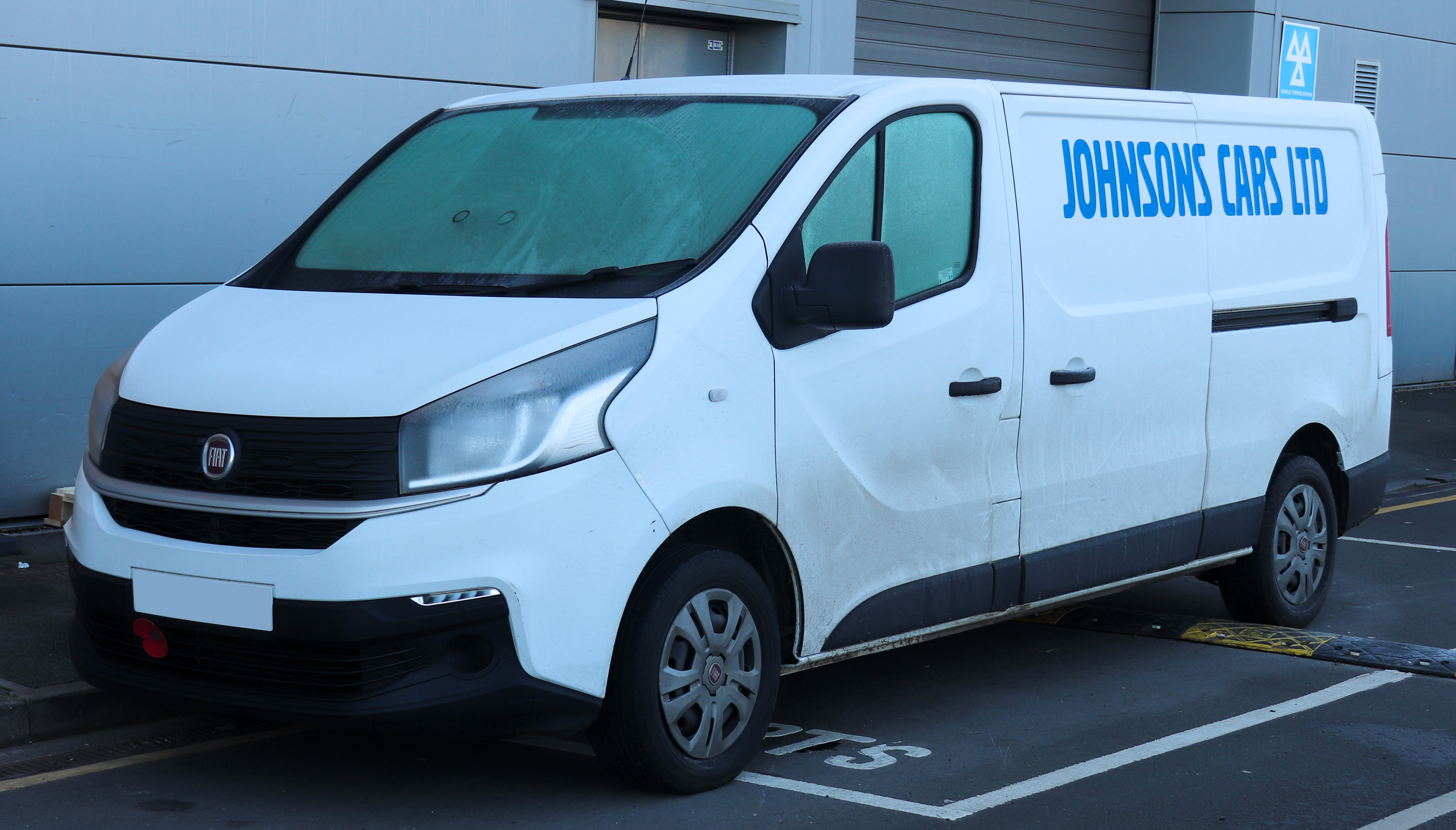
Fiat Talento

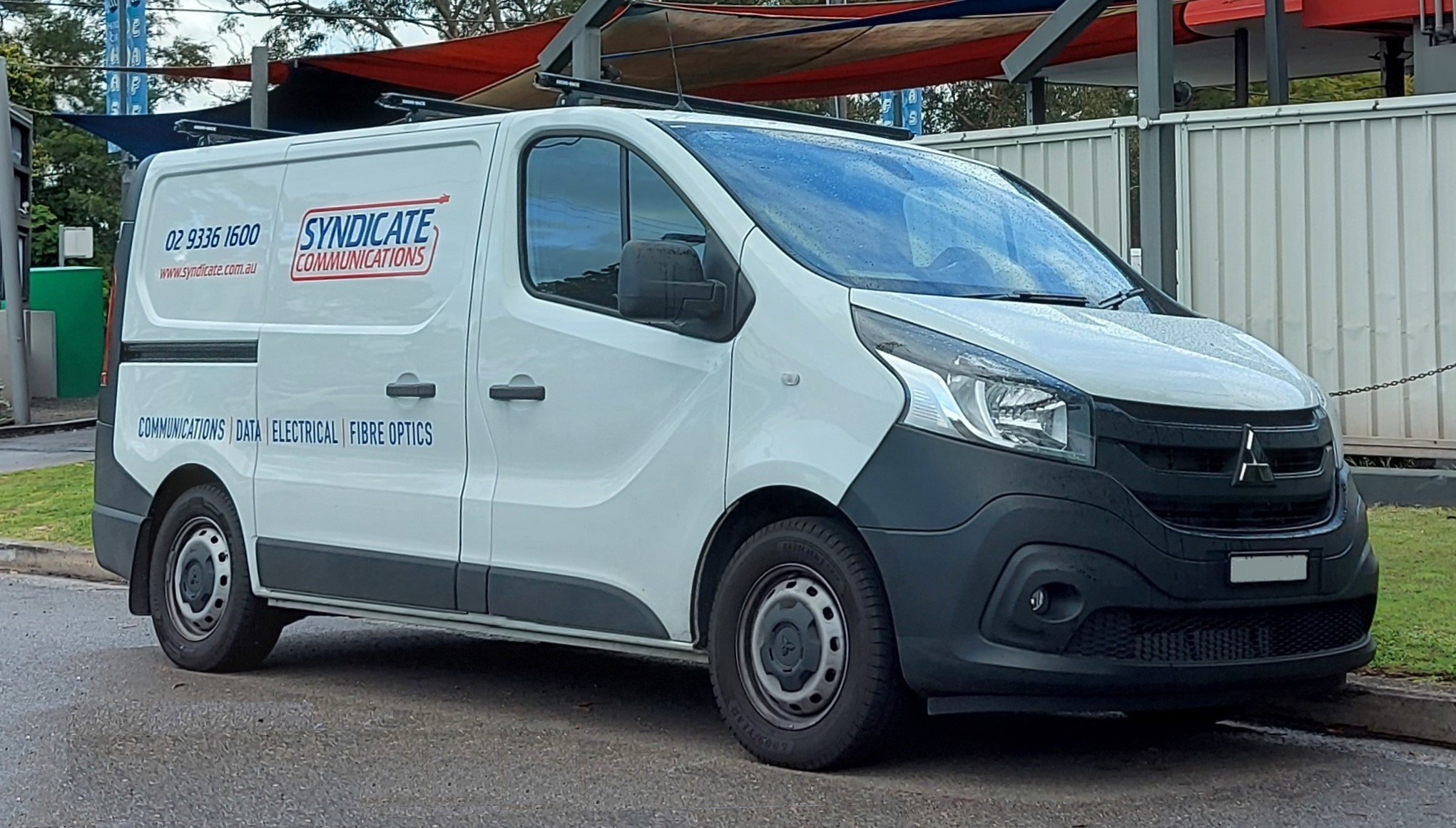
Mitsubishi Express

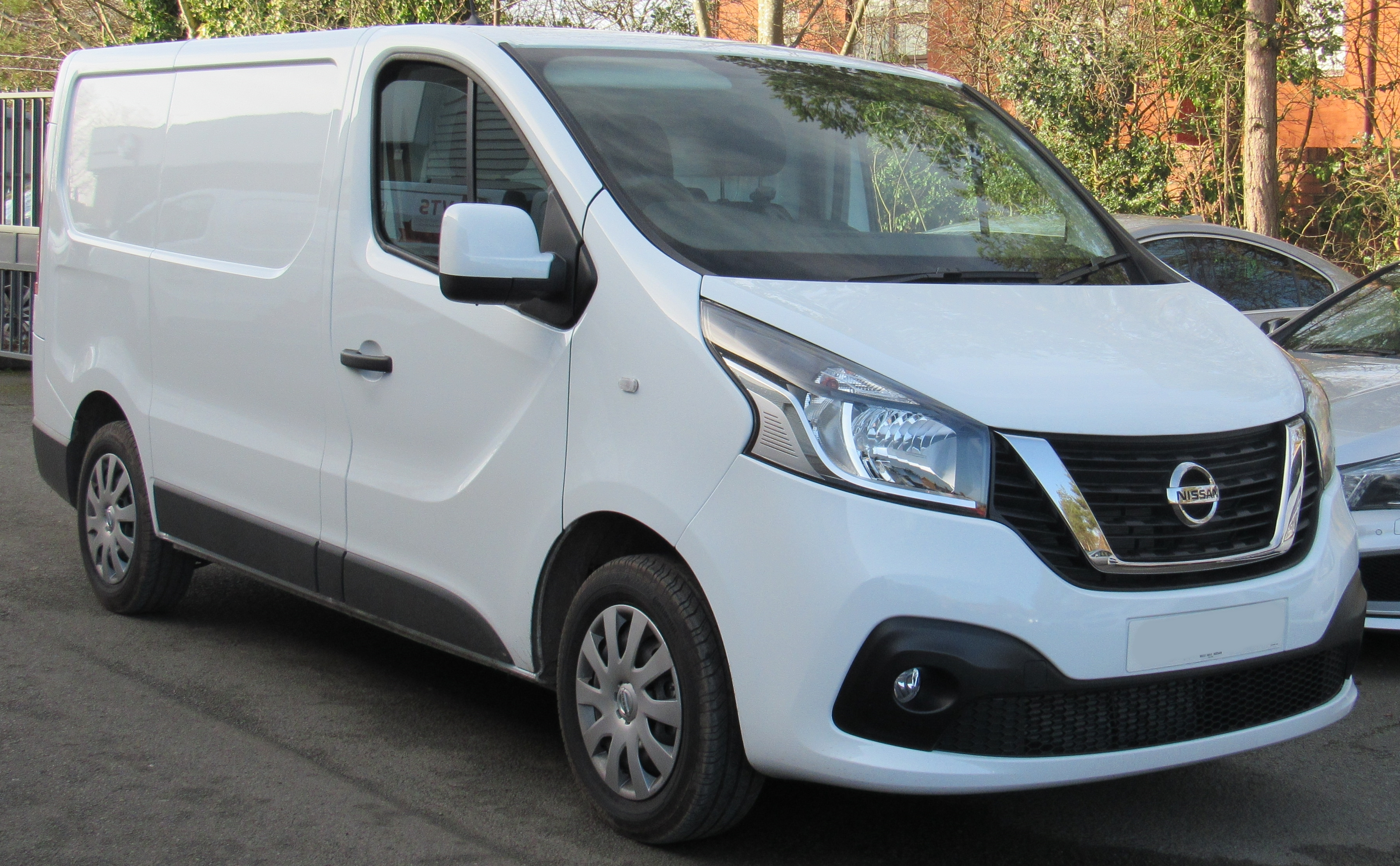
Nissan NV300 (pre-facelift)

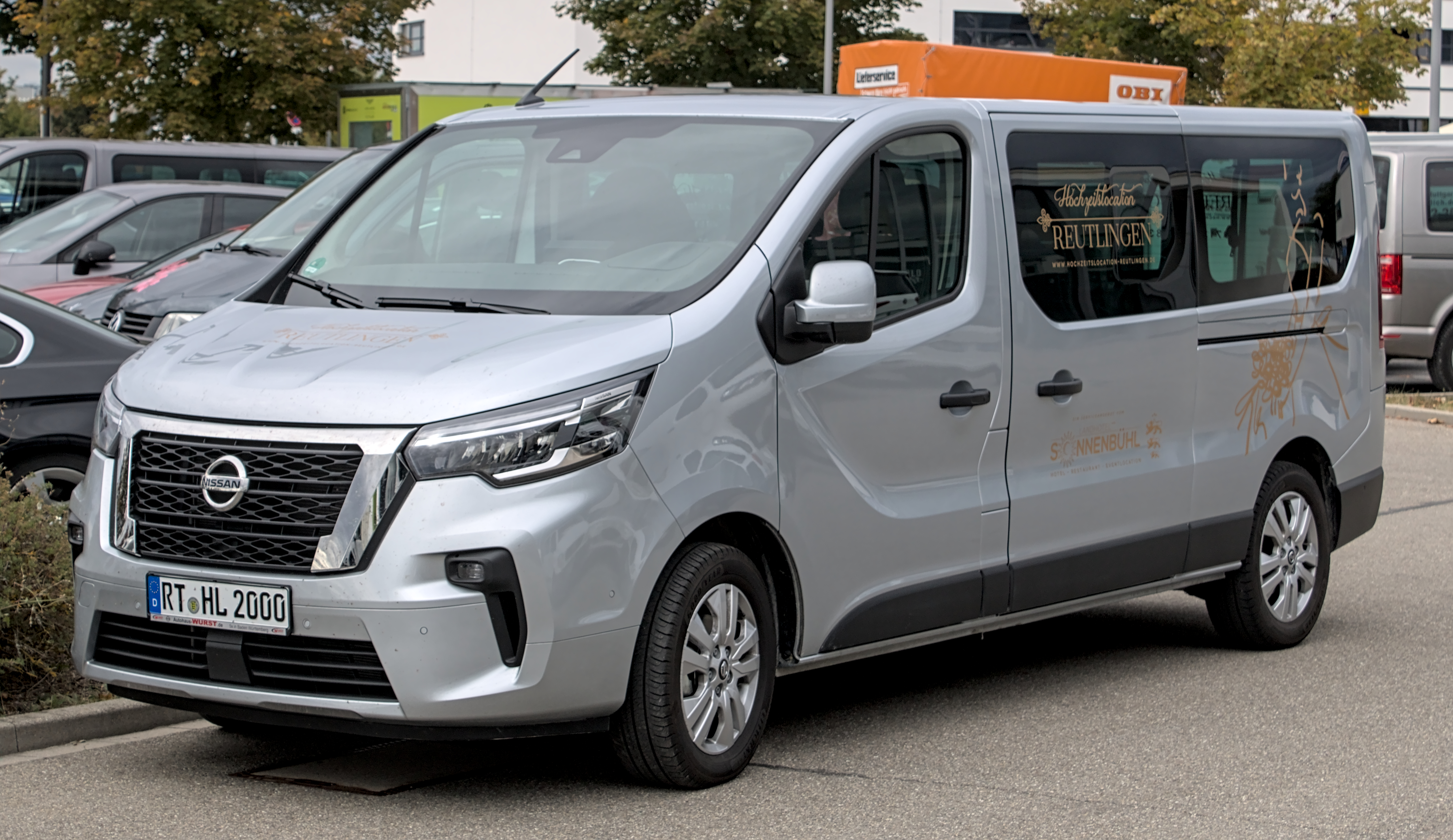
Nissan NV300 (facelift)

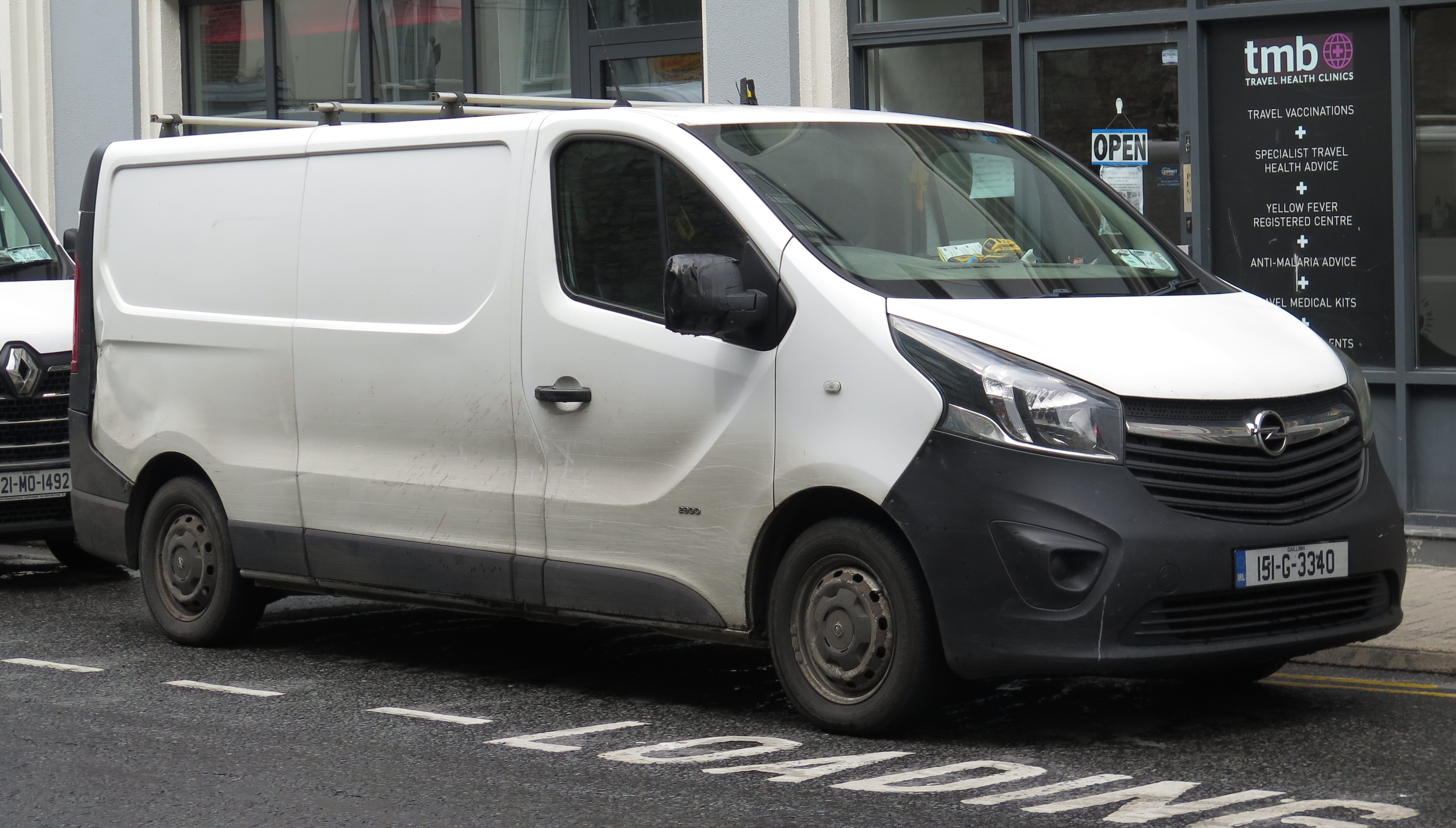
Opel Vivaro

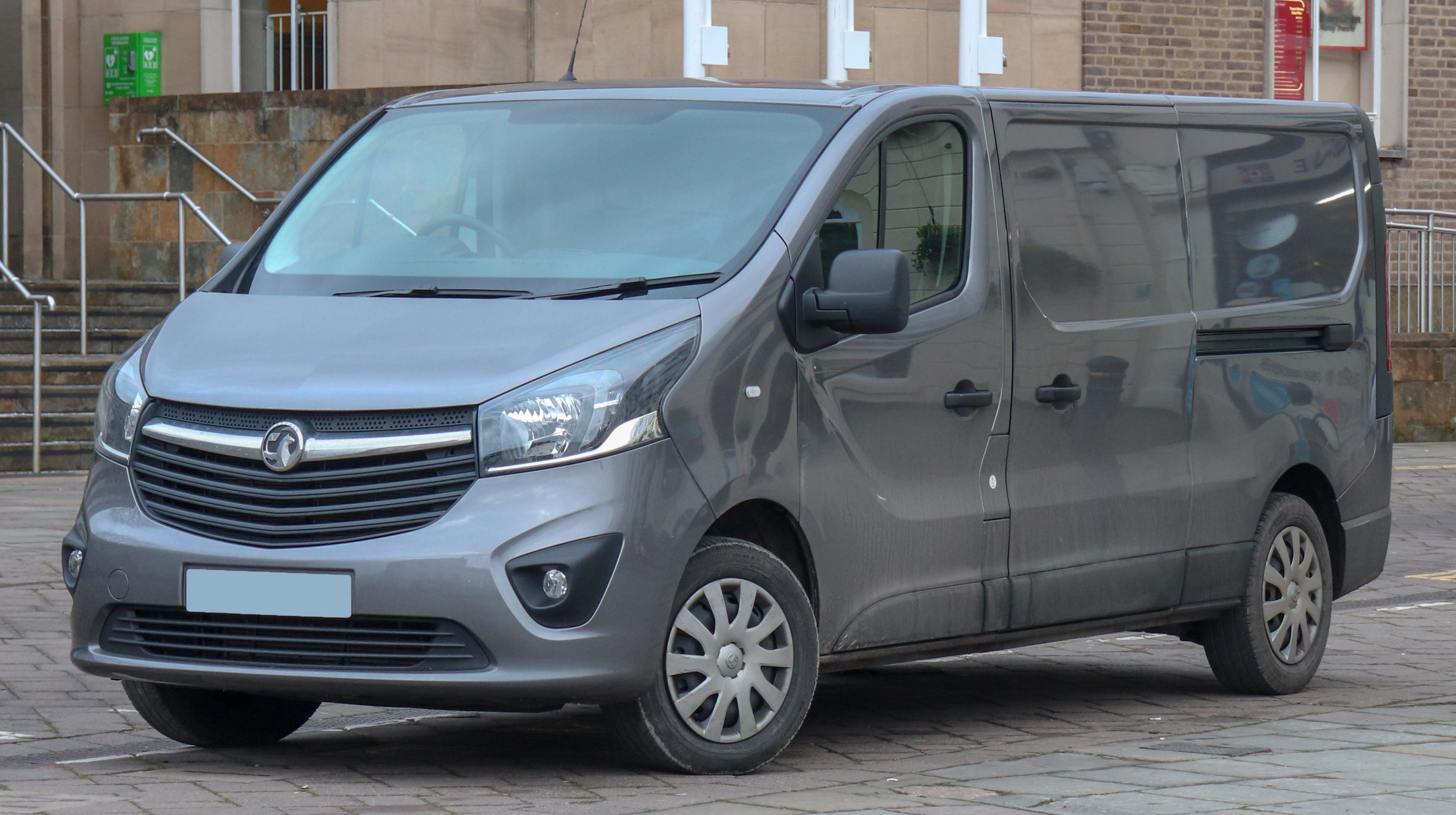
Vauxhall Vivaro

=== Models ===
==== Trafic Formula Edition ====
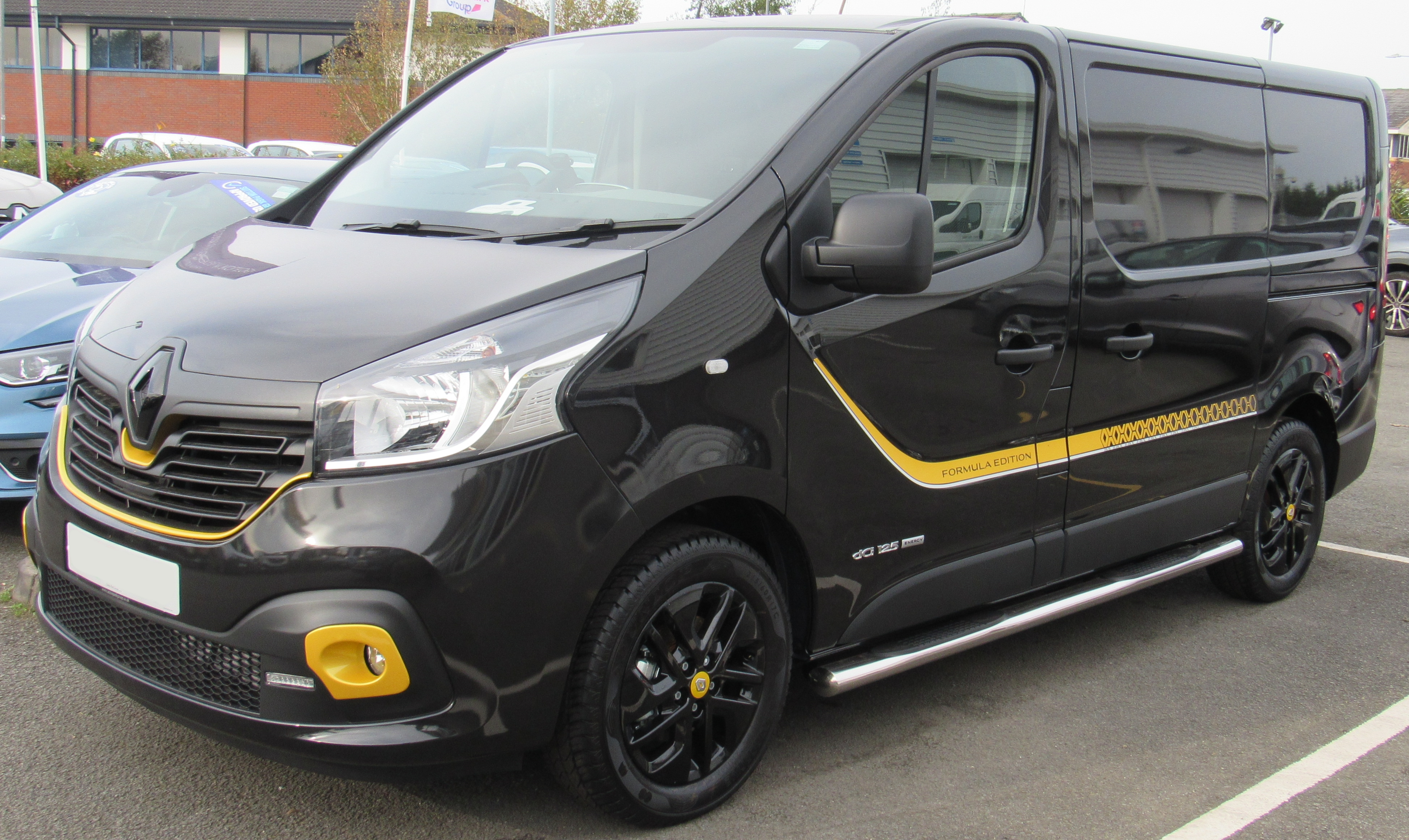
2017 Renault Trafic Formula Edition

Launched in 2018, the Formula Edition was available on the Trafic alongside the Kangoo and Master, and featured a new paint and wheels, plus black and yellow trim.

==== Trafic X-Track ====
Launched in 2016, the Trafic X-Track is a front-wheel drive offroad version of the Trafic.

==== Trafic Van E-Tech ====
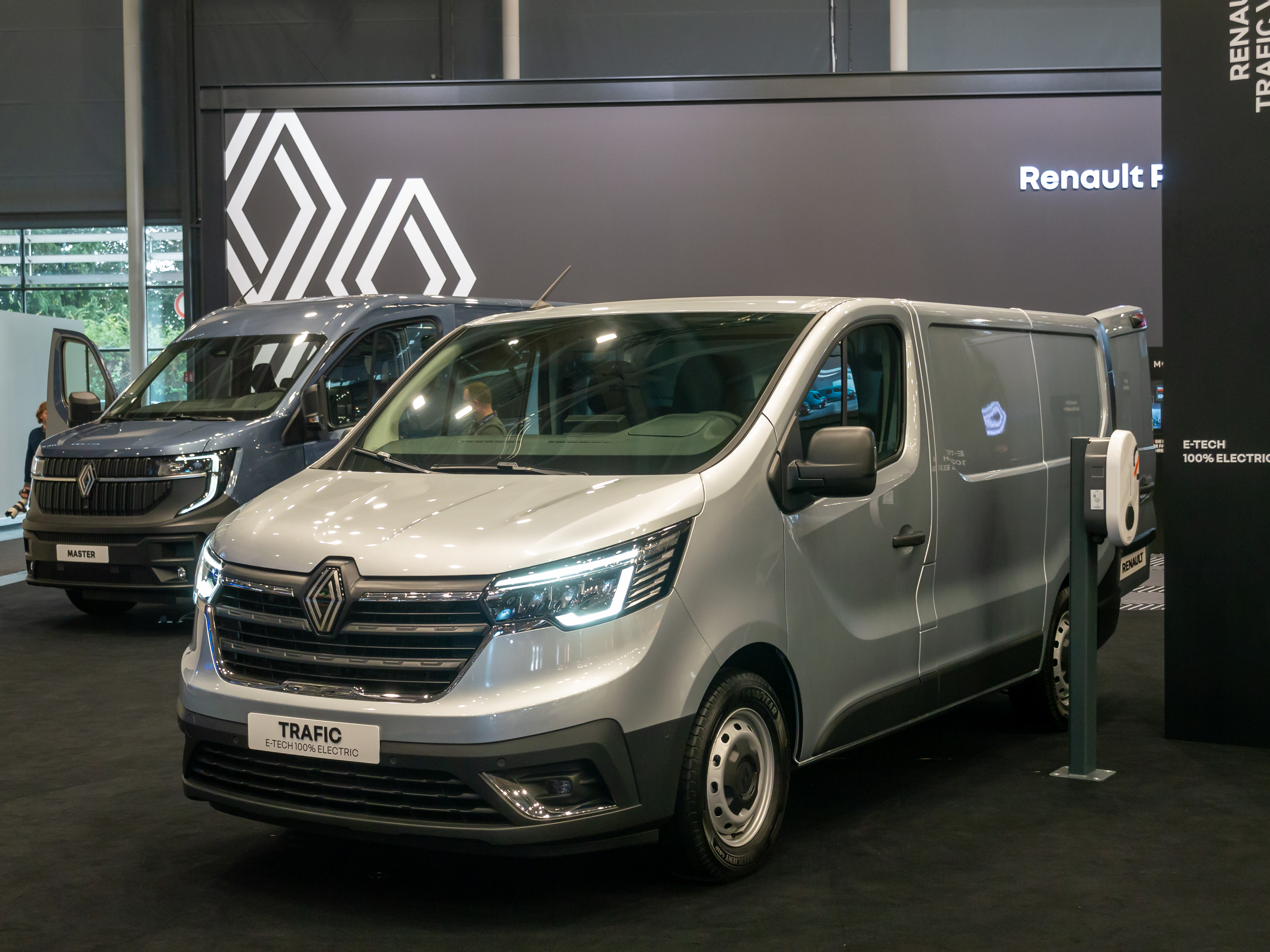
2022 Renault Trafic E-Tech

The 100% electric Trafic was officially presented at the 2022 IAA. It is equipped with a 90 kW (120 hp) electric traction motor drawing from the same 52 kW-hr battery as the larger electric Master E-Tech, giving a WLTP range of 297 km (185 mi). The van can accept charging power of up to 7 kW (single-phase AC) or 22 kW (three-phase AC), and a fast-charging option (50 kW DC) is available. A passenger van variant may be based on the Hippie Caviar Hotel concept shown in 2021.

=== Safety ===
==== ANCAP ====
ANCAP test results Mitsubishi Express all variants (2021, aligned with Euro NCAP)
Test	Points	%
Overall:	0 /5 stars	
Adult occupant:	21.19	55%
Child occupant:	N/A	N/A%
Pedestrian:	22.10	40%
Safety assist:	1.25	7%

ANCAP test results Renault Trafic all variants (2024)
Overall
Grading:	69% (Gold)

ANCAP test results Renault Trafic all variants (2022)
Overall
Grading:	45% (Silver)

==== Euro NCAP ====
Euro NCAP test results Renault Trafic (2025)
Test	Score
Overall:	4 /5 stars
Safe driving	68%
Crash avoidance	61%
Post crash	80%

Euro NCAP test results Nissan Primastar (2025)
Test	Score
Overall:	4 /5 stars
Safe driving	68%
Crash avoidance	61%
Post crash	80%

Euro NCAP test results Opel Vivaro (2025)
Test	Score
Overall:	4 /5 stars
Safe driving	75%
Crash avoidance	52%
Post crash	80%

=== Engines ===
Diesel engines
Model	Engine type	Power	Torque
1.6 dCi	1,598 cc (98 cu in) I4 turbo	95 PS (70 kW; 94 hp)	260 N⋅m (192 lb⋅ft)
1.6 dCi	1,598 cc (98 cu in) I4 turbo	125 PS (92 kW; 123 hp)	320 N⋅m (236 lb⋅ft)
1.6 dCi	1,598 cc (98 cu in) I4 turbo	145 PS (107 kW; 143 hp)	340 N⋅m (251 lb⋅ft)
2.0 dCi	1,997 cc (122 cu in) I4 turbo	120 PS (88 kW; 118 hp)	320 N⋅m (236 lb⋅ft)
2.0 dCi	1,997 cc (122 cu in) I4 turbo	150 PS (110 kW; 148 hp)	350 N⋅m (258 lb⋅ft)
2.0 dCi	1,997 cc (122 cu in) I4 turbo	170 PS (125 kW; 168 hp)	380 N⋅m (280 lb⋅ft)

=== Dimensions ===
Key Trafic III (X82) dimensions
Length Height				L1		L2
Length Height				Exterior	5,080 mm (200.0 in)	5,480 mm (215.7 in)
Length Height				WB	3,098 mm (122.0 in)	3,498 mm (137.7 in)
Length Height				Interior	2,537 mm (99.9 in)	2,937 mm (115.6 in)
H1	Exterior	Interior	Volume	5.8 m^{3} (200 ft^{3})		7.75 m^{3} (274 ft^{3})
H1	1,971 mm (77.6 in)	1,387 mm (54.6 in)	Volume	5.8 m^{3} (200 ft^{3})		7.75 m^{3} (274 ft^{3})
H2	2,498 mm (98.3 in)	1,898 mm (74.7 in)	Volume	6.7 m^{3} (240 ft^{3})		8.9 m^{3} (310 ft^{3})

Notes

- Interior width is 1,662 mm (65.4 in) for all versions, 1,268 mm (49.9 in) between the internal wheel arches.
