= The Grand Tour Game =

2019 video game

- Developer: Amazon Game Studios Seattle (Note: Additional work by Heavy Iron Studios)
- Publisher: Amazon Game Studios
- Engine: Amazon Lumberyard
- Platforms: PlayStation 4, Xbox One
- Release: WW: 15 January 2019
- Genre: Racing game
- Modes: Single-player, Multiplayer

The Grand Tour Game is an episodic racing video game developed and published by Amazon Game Studios with additional support being provided by Heavy Iron Studios. The title was released for the PlayStation 4 and Xbox One. It is based on the reality television series The Grand Tour. It covers the first episode of its first two series, and released a new episode of the game simultaneously with each episode of the third series. It is Amazon's first video game for PS4 and Xbox One.

The game was first announced on 21 August 2018 by Amazon and later on DriveTribe, and over the coming months, several trailers were released. The game was launched on 15 January 2019, three days before the third series was due to start on Amazon Prime.

In June 2020, the game was delisted from the PlayStation Store, Xbox Games Store and Amazon. The reason stated by Amazon was so the developers could 'focus our efforts and resources on other projects.' It was also announced that all bonus content such as the Pre-order and Twitch Prime vehicles would expire on 31 July 2020.

== Gameplay ==
The game allows the player to experience an episode of The Grand Tour, but some sections of the program are replaced with 'Scenes', challenges which the player completes. The aim of the game is to collect medals from the Scenes, awarded based on the performance of the player. These rewards, from best to worst, are the Gold Medal, Silver Medal, Bronze Medal and The 'Toilet Flush', if the game deems the performance particularly poor. Scenes usually involve driving the cars which appear in The Grand Tour's episodes, in doing various challenges (like racing or top speed targets). However, some challenges involve taking a photo, completing a puzzle, or in the episode 'Pick Up Put Downs' the player can control a certain gun. Most episodes have between 14 and 15 Scenes, although this varies dramatically for some episodes.

Most Scenes are similar to what happens in their respective episodes, although some Scenes have been altered or omitted due to licensing restrictions. For example, the segments from Series 3, Episode 10, where James May drives the Toyota Yaris GRMN, or when Jeremy Clarkson drives the McLaren Senna are not available in the game. The Jaguar XE SV Project 8 from Series 4 Episode 6 was replaced by 'The Popmobile', which was supposed to be a Project 8, but wrapped in bubble wrap. This was also due to licensing issues. The game features voice-overs from the presenters Jeremy Clarkson, Richard Hammond and James May, as well as from professional driver Abbie Eaton. Alongside the single-player mode, the game also has a local multiplayer split-screen mode where 1-4 people can race with cars of their choice on the various tracks in the game.

== Episodes ==
=== Series 1 ===
No. overall	No. in series	Title	Vehicles Featured	Scenes	Release Date
1	1	"The Holy Trinity"	Galpin Rocket, Roush Stage 3, Shelby GT350R, McLaren P1, Porsche 918 Spyder, LaFerrari, BMW M2, Ferrari 488 GTB	15	15 January 2019

=== Series 2 ===
No. overall	No. in series	Title	Vehicles Featured	Scenes	Release Date
2	1	"Past, Present, or Future"	Honda NSX, Rimac Concept One, Lamborghini Aventador S	11	15 January 2019

=== Series 3 ===
No. overall	No. in series	Title	Vehicles Featured	Scenes	Release Date
3	1	"Motown Funk"	Dodge Challenger SRT Demon, Hennessey Exorcist, RTR Spec 3, McLaren 720S Coupe (Note: The McLaren Senna was replaced with the McLaren 720S Coupe from Series 2, Episode 4)	16	18 January 2019
4–5	2–3	"Colombia Special Parts 1 & 2"	Chevrolet Silverado 2500, Fiat Panda, Jeep Wrangler Sahara	26	26 January 2019
6	4	"Pick Up Put Downs"	Mercedes X-Class, Ford Ranger, Volkswagen Amarok, 'Popmobile' (Note: The Jaguar XE SV Project 8 was replaced with a car covered in bubble wrap and packing tape, titled the 'Popmobile')	14	1 February 2019
7	5	"An Itchy Urus"	Alpine A110 (Note: The Alpine A110, reviewed by James May, was not present upon release of the episode, but was released on 8 March 2019)Lamborghini Urus, Porsche 911 Turbo S, Ford Cortina Lotus, Lotus Type 38, Lotus Type 25	12	8 February 2019
8	6	"Chinese Food For Thought"	NIO EP9, BMW 750iL, Cadillac Seville STS, Mercedes-Benz W140 600L, Fulu A7	10	15 February 2019
9	7	"Well Aged Scotch"	Alfa Romeo GTV6, Fiat X1/9, Lancia Gamma Coupe, BMW M5, BMW Alpina B5 Birturbo	14	22 February 2019
10	8	"International Buffoons Vacation"	Alumi Craft Class 10 ('Spaniel Jumper'), Jake's Fabworks JF5U ('Jeremy's Jumper'), 'Plastic Pickup', Winnebago Chieftain, National RV Tropical ('May's RV'), Fleetwood Pace Arrow ('Clarkson's RV'), International Harvester S-Series ('International Trucks')	13	1 March 2019
11	9	"Aston, Astronauts and Angelina's Children"	Aston Martin Vantage, Bentley Bentayga, 1962 Chevrolet Corvette, 1967 Chevrolet Corvette, Citroën C3 Aircross, De Tomaso Pantera GTS	15	8 March 2019
12	10	"The Youth Vote"	Ferrari Testarossa, Lamborghini Countach, Ford Fiesta ST, Volkswagen Polo GTI (Note: The Toyota Yaris GRMN, driven by James May, is not available in the game.)	14	15 March 2019
13	11	"Sea to Unsalty Sea"	Aston Martin DBS Superleggera, Bentley Continental GT, BMW M850i, Renault 9	15	22 March 2019
14	12	"Legends and Luggage"	Lancia Delta Futurista, Porsche 911 GT2 RS, Porsche 917K-Chassis 015, electric suitcase	12	29 March 2019
15	13	"Survival of the Fattest"	Flat Pack car/John (Note: In this episode, Clarkson, Hammond and May assemble a car from flat packed parts parachuted from a helicopter, hence the name Flat Pack car.)	17	5 April 2019
16	14	"Funeral for a Ford"	Ford Cortina Mk I, Ford Cortina Mk II, Ford Cortina Mk III, Ford Mondeo ST Estate, Ford Sierra Cosworth RS500, Ford Lotus Cortina Rally	14	12 April 2019

== Reception ==
Reception

Aggregate score
Aggregator	Score
Metacritic	PS4: 52/100; XONE: 52/100

On the review website Metacritic, the game was awarded a score of 52/100 for the PlayStation 4 and the Xbox One, indicating "mixed or average reviews".

The game received praise for the diverse list of vehicles featured, many of which were exclusive to The Grand Tour Game, the track locations, appeal to fans of the show, gadgets available to use and the transitions between the episodes and gameplay. However, the controls and dated graphical appearance were criticised. Despite this, fans of the show gave the game mostly positive reviews.
