= List of The Grand Tour episodes =

The Grand Tour is a British motoring television series that is streaming on Amazon Prime Video, originally presented by Jeremy Clarkson, Richard Hammond, and James May (who also co-created the show along with Andy Wilman). The programme focuses on conducting reviews of various models of car, new models and vintage classics, as well as tackling motoring-styled challenges and races, and features the use of studio segments between pre-recorded films. 46 episodes were released over the six series.

The following is a list of episodes, listed in order of their original air date, along with information regarding featured cars that were reviewed and the main feature of the episode; for the second series only, the list also includes the celebrity guests who appeared on the programme. The Grand Tour conducted its studio segments via a travelling tent for the first series only, information pertaining its location is briefly described within the first sentence of the short summary for each listed episode of the respective series.

== Series overview ==
Series	Episodes	Originally released	
Series	Episodes	First released	Last released
1	13	18 November 2016	3 February 2017
2	11	8 December 2017	16 February 2018
3	14	18 January 2019	12 April 2019
4	4	13 December 2019	17 December 2021
5	3	16 September 2022	16 February 2024
6	1	13 September 2024	

== Episodes ==
=== Series 1 (2016–2017) ===
For the first series, with the exception of the two-part Namibia special, each episode featured studio segments filmed in a makeshift tent hosted across various foreign locales. Of these, two sites were each used for two separate but consecutive episodes. Although the series featured celebrities, most appeared in a minor capacity while others were mentioned or involved a look-alike – these appearances mainly were for a running gag involving them heading to meet the presenters in their tent for an interview, only to "die" in a freak accident.

No. overall	No. in series	Title	Main feature(s)	Vehicles reviewed	Special guest(s)	Tent location	Original release date
1	1	"The Holy Trinity"	Hybrid hypercar "Holy Trinity" comparison: (McLaren P1, Porsche 918 Spyder, LaFerrari)	BMW M2	Jérôme d'Ambrosio, Armie Hammer, Jeremy Renner, Carol Vorderman, Hothouse Flowers	Rabbit Dry Lake, California	18 November 2016 (Note: This episode was made available 20 minutes before it was due to be released on midnight of the advertised date.)
Jeremy Clarkson, Richard Hammond, and James May launch their brand new programme by conducting a comparison review amongst a selection of hybrid hypercars — Clarkson in the McLaren P1, Hammond in the Porsche 918 Spyder, and May in LaFerrari — putting them through their paces at Algarve International Circuit in Portugal with a series of drag races and road tests, before seeing which is the fastest in timed laps. Meanwhile, Clarkson takes a look at the BMW M2 while introducing the programme's own test track nicknamed "The Eboladrome" and their test driver known only as "The American".
2	2	"Operation Desert Stumble"	Training exercise with the SAS, May takes a look at Spinning	Aston Martin Vulcan, Audi S8 Plus	Charlize Theron (Note: This celebrity did not appear as themselves and was portrayed by an uncredited lookalike)	Johannesburg, South Africa	25 November 2016 (Note: This episode was made available one hour before it was due to be released on midnight of the advertised date.)
Clarkson, Hammond and May find themselves in Jordan undertaking a SAS-style military training exercise per their producer's instructions, escorting a "VIP" to an important location while tackling a review of the Audi S8 Plus. Meanwhile, May takes part in the specialised South African motorsport of "Spinning" and finds out how to compete in it, while Clarkson tests the Aston Martin Vulcan at the Eboladrome.
3	3	"Opera, Arts and Donuts"	Grand Tour of North Italy: (Rolls-Royce Dawn, Aston Martin DB11, Dodge Challenger SRT Hellcat), Destroying Clarkson's House	N/A	Simon Pegg	Whitby, United Kingdom	2 December 2016
The presenters take on a tour of Northern Italy, travelling across the country in a car of their choosing — May takes the Rolls-Royce Dawn, Clarkson takes the Aston Martin DB11, and Hammond takes the Dodge Challenger SRT Hellcat. The group begin at the Palio di Siena horse race, exploring art in Florence, racing each other at the Mugello Circuit, visiting the Lamborghini Museum and Piazza dei Signori, Vicenza, and finish off their tour in the city of Venice. Meanwhile Hammond and May fulfil a bet from the first episode during their hypercar reviews, by destroying Clarkson's old home in Chadlington, Oxfordshire, as part of the wager their colleague lost. Note: The demolition of Clarkson's Oxfordshire home was scripted for The Grand Tour, as it was scheduled to be demolished at the time of filming for this episode.
4	4	"Enviro-mental"	Building eco-based cars	Porsche 911 GT3 RS, BMW M4 GTS	Jimmy Carr	Whitby, United Kingdom	9 December 2016
The presenters take on the challenge to make their own environmentally friendly car bodies using the platform of a Land Rover Discovery, before tackling an 11-mile road trip in Wales to a dirt track to race against three normal cars. Meanwhile, Clarkson performs a comparison test between the Porsche 911 GT3 RS and the BMW M4 GTS at the Eboladrome.
5	5	"Moroccan Roll"	Trip of Morocco in roadsters: (Mazda MX-5, Zenos E10S, Alfa Romeo 4C Spider), Playing Car Battleships	N/A	Golden Earring	Rotterdam, Netherlands	16 December 2016
The presenters travel to Morocco with the best affordable roadster they prefer — Hammond favours the Mazda MX-5, May favours the Zenos E10S, and Clarkson favours the Alfa Romeo 4C Spider — in order to find out which is the best, conducting tests that include a drag race, weighing their cars, and performing a timed lap on a specially made circuit at Atlas Corporation Studios in Ouarzazate. Meanwhile, Hammond and May make their own version of Battleships, using old cars as the "ships" and several G-Wizes as "missiles", as they see who has the keenest strategy to win.
6	6	"Happy Finnish Christmas"	LeMans rivalry between Ford and Ferrari	Ford Mustang GT, Ford Focus RS	John Surtees, Bob Geldof, Kimi Räikkönen	Saariselkä, Finland	23 December 2016
Hammond and Clarkson compare the new right-hand-drive Ford Mustang GT to the new Ford Focus RS, driving the car they prefer to see which is the best and the fastest around the Eboladrome. Meanwhile, May looks over the historic Le Mans 24 Hour racing rivalry between Ford and Ferrari, which resulted in the creation of the Ford GT40 and the Ferrari P3, while the presenters take a look at a selection of festive motoring-themed gift ideas.
7	7	"The Beach (Buggy) Boys – Part 1"	Prove that beach buggies are good vehicles	N/A	None	N/A	30 December 2016
The trio find themselves taking on a special challenge arranged by their producer — customising their own beach buggy to their own specification, and them putting them to the test on a one thousand miles (1,600 km) along Namibia's Skeleton Coast. May bases his on the original 1960s buggy design, Clarkson opts for his to be fitted with a V8 engine, while Hammond upgrades his with rally grade suspension and off-road tyres. In the first part, the trio journey towards the shipwreck of Eduard Bohlen, cross the harsh terrain and sand dunes of the Namib Desert, and make for the capital of Windhoek.
8	8	"The Beach (Buggy) Boys – Part 2"	Prove that beach buggies are good vehicles	N/A	None	N/A	31 December 2016
In the second part of their beach buggy journey, the trio drive their modified buggies towards the Namibia-Angola border. Starting out at Windhoek, the group contend with rough roads and harsh off-road terrain, and traverse a crocodile infested river, whereupon they soon come to the conclusion that their producer might have been right about beach buggies, when they find themselves within sight of their goal.
9	9	"Berks to the Future"	Creating a "proper" SUV, Making Post-Apocalyptic Vehicles, Ingenious Charging Methods	Honda NSX	Nena, Chelsea F.C. players including Thibaut Courtois, Michy Batshuayi, Diego Costa and Oscar	Stuttgart, Germany	6 January 2017
Clarkson attempts to make a "proper" car by combining classic car bodies with the chassis of a Land Rover Discovery, whereupon he tries out his creation by taking his fellow presenters for a trip to Chelsea Football Club and later seeing how much it fetches at a car auction in Kensington. Meanwhile, the presenters take a look at ingenious charging methods, May heads for the Eboladrome to review the new Honda NSX, and Hammond tries to make some post-apocalyptic creations that his colleagues soon destroy via different methods.
10	10	"Dumb Fight at the O.K. Coral"	Saving coral reefs with car body shells in Barbados	Alfa Romeo Giulia Quadrifoglio	Brian Johnson	Nashville, Tennessee	13 January 2017
The presenters attempt to take five car bodies to the coral reefs off the coast near Barbados, where they soon face issues along the way that force them to complete the job with one of the shells they possess. Meanwhile, Clarkson conducts an extensive review of the new Alfa Romeo Giulia Quadrifoglio with a journey between Wales and the Eboladrome.
11	11	"Italian Lessons"	Second-hand Maserati challenge: (Biturbo S Coupé, 430 Saloon, Zagato Spyder)	Fiat Abarth 124 Spider	Sir Chris Hoy	Loch Ness, United Kingdom	20 January 2017
The presenters head to France to prove that second-hand Maseratis are a good purchase, each using a specific model - Clarkson buys a Biturbo S Coupé, Hammond buys a 430 Saloon, and May buys a Zagato Spyder. Each vehicles undergoes a series of tests, before the trio embark on a road trip across Northern France, which culminates in a race to the Port of Le Havre. Meanwhile, Hammond heads to the Eboladrome to test out the new Fiat Abarth 124 Spider.
12	12	"[censored] to [censored]" (Note: This episode's title is dictated officially as such by the production team.)	Road trip along the "Romantic Road" in British SUVs: (Bentley Bentayga, Range Rover, Jaguar F-Pace)	Lexus GS-F	Tim Burton	Loch Ness, United Kingdom	27 January 2017
The presenters head for a road trip along the Romantic Road, as part of their review into a selection of British 4x4s — May reviews the Bentley Bentayga, Clarkson reviews the Range Rover, and Hammond reviews the Jaguar F-Pace — beginning in Germany, travelling across Bavaria, and finishing at a quarry in Austria where they conduct timed laps to see which car is the fastest. Meanwhile, Clarkson heads to the Eboladrome to review the new Lexus GS-F.
13	13	"Past v Future"	Porsche 918 Spyder vs. Bugatti Veyron drag race, May takes a look at Off-road Winching, Hammond learns to Drift	Volkswagen Golf GTI, BMW i3	Roger Daltrey, Wilko Johnson, Daniel Ricciardo	Dubai, United Arab Emirates	3 February 2017
A "past versus future" comparison between Clarkson's Volkswagen Golf GTI and May's BMW i3 takes place, putting them through a drag race, and seeing which is best on a road trip from London to Dartmoor. Meanwhile, May takes part in the sport of Off-road Winching, while Hammond drag races the Porsche 918 Spyder against the Bugatti Veyron and later a 1900 horsepower Nissan Patrol, before travelling to Michelin's proving grounds in France to learn how to drift, later competing against professional drifters. The show concludes with outtakes of Clarkson and Hammond demonstrating their skill in drifting cars.

=== Series 2 (2017–2018) ===
From the second series on, the studio tent was set up at a permanent location in the Cotswolds. In addition, unlike the first series, celebrities were more fully involved in the programme, taking part in a feature involving head-to-head timed laps between two guests in each episode, with the exception of the final episode which was a special.

No. overall	No. in series	Title	Main feature(s)	Vehicles reviewed	Special guest(s)	Original release date
14	1	"Past, present or future"	Best powertrain for supercars: (Lamborghini Aventador S, Honda NSX, Rimac Concept One)	N/A	David Hasselhoff, Ricky Wilson	8 December 2017
The presenters head to Switzerland to compare a supercar of the past, present and future to see which is best — Clarkson represents the past with a petrol powered Lamborghini Aventador S, May represents the present with a hybrid powered Honda NSX, and Hammond represents the future with an all-electric powered Rimac Concept One — taking them on a journey across the Swiss Alps, where they check out museums, conduct a drag race, and then put their cars into a hill climbing race at Hemberg. In a new segment entitled "Celebrity Face Off", Ricky Wilson and David Hasselhoff perform a timed lap each to see who is the fastest between them. Note: Richard Hammond was injured in the course of filming for this episode, after his car crashed upon finishing the hill-climbing race (he had broken his leg). Footage of this and Hammond being airlifted to hospital was released on YouTube.
15	2	"The Falls Guys"	Epic race from New York to Niagara Falls: Ford GT vs. public transport	Ford GT, Mercedes AMG GT R	Kevin Pietersen, Brian Wilson	15 December 2017
Clarkson engages in a race with the new Ford GT to see if it can beat May and a still-recovering Hammond using public transport, from New York City to an observation tower overlooking the Niagara Falls. Elsewhere, Clarkson reviews the Mercedes AMG GT R before new test driver Abbie Eaton takes it around the Eboladrome, while Kevin Pietersen competes against Brian Wilson in "Celebrity Face Off".
16	3	"Bah Humbug-atti"	Lunchbreak motorsport racing	Kia Stinger GT, Bugatti Chiron	Hugh Bonneville, Casey Anderson	22 December 2017
Clarkson recreates the lifestyle of a jet set driver in his review of the new Bugatti Chiron, testing it out on a journey from Saint-Tropez to Turin via the Alps, complete with a drag race during the trip, while May heads to Mallorca to test out the Kia Stinger GT before competing against longboard riders on a race along a mountain road. Elsewhere, Hammond and May attempt to invent a new motorsport for bored office workers at lunchtime, the presenters take a look at festive motoring gifts, and Hugh Bonneville and Casey Anderson compete against each other in "Celebrity Face Off".
17	4	"Unscripted"	Doing an unscripted film in Croatia: (Audi TT RS, Ariel Nomad, Lada Riva)	McLaren 720S	Michael Ball, Alfie Boe	29 December 2017
The presenters head to Croatia to create two separate "unscripted" films for The Grand Tour — Clarkson and Hammond conduct a comparison review of the Audi TT RS and the Ariel Nomad with a drag race and a rally race, while May attempts to convert a Lada Riva into a fire engine. Meanwhile, Hammond tests out the McLaren 720S at the Eboladrome, the trio host an awards ceremony for "Conversation Street", and Michael Ball and Alfie Boe compete in "Celebrity Face Off".
18	5	"Up, down and round the farm"	"Farmkhana" film	Ripsaw EV2, Volkswagen up! GTI	Bill Bailey, Dominic Cooper, Mark Higgins	5 January 2018
Hammond travels to Dubai to review the Ripsaw EV2 with tests around the city and the surrounding desert, while May heads to the Eboladrome to review the Volkswagen Up! GTI. Meanwhile, Clarkson creates a Ken Block-styled film entitled "Farmkhana" complete with outtakes and behind-the-scenes footage of the filming, and Bill Bailey and Dominic Cooper compete in "Celebrity Face Off".
19	6	"Jaaaaaaaags"	Second-hand Jaguars across Colorado: (XJR, XK8 convertible, 420G, XJ6, XJ-S)	N/A	Luke Evans, Kiefer Sutherland	12 January 2018
The presenters head to Colorado to prove Jaguar's reputation for reliability with three of its classic cars they have purchased — Clarkson buys the XJR, May buys an XK8 convertible, and Hammond buys a 420G — and putting them through a series of challenges on a road trip from Grand Junction to Telluride. Meanwhile, Kiefer Sutherland and Luke Evans compete in "Celebrity Face Off".
20	7	"It's a gas, gas, gas"	Rally rivalry between Audi and Lancia, Refuelling on the move	Lamborghini Huracán Performante	Anthony Joshua, Bill Goldberg	19 January 2018
Clarkson takes an in-depth look of the rivalry between Audi and Lancia in rallying, with a comparison review of their most renowned cars in rally motorsport history — the Audi Quattro and the Lancia Rally 037, while Hammond and May attempt to come up with new methods for refuelling. Meanwhile, at the Eboladrome, Hammond reviews the Lamborghini Huracán Performanté competing it in a drag race against May's Ferrari 458 Speciale, and Anthony Joshua competes against Bill Goldberg in "Celebrity Face Off".
21	8	"Blasts from the past"	Modernised classics vs. a modern car: (Jaguar XKSS, Aston Martin DB4 GT, Honda Civic Type R)	Ford GT	Stewart Copeland, Nick Mason	26 January 2018
Starting in Pau, Pyrénées-Atlantiques, France and ending in Barcelona, Spain, Hammond and Clarkson attempt to prove that two modernised classics — a Jaguar XK SS and an Aston Martin DB4 GT — are better than a modern Honda Civic Type R driven by May. Meanwhile, Clarkson reviews the Ford GT at the Eboladrome following the Niagara Falls race, while Nick Mason and Stewart Copeland compete in "Celebrity Face Off".
22	9	"Breaking, badly"	Record attempt for fastest speed for a British amphibious vehicle	Jaguar XJ220, Bugatti EB 110 Super Sport	Dynamo, Penn & Teller	2 February 2018
The presenters build two different amphibious vehicle — one based on a Rolls-Royce Spey, and the other using a Bond Bug — to see if they can break the UK speed record for vehicles of this class during the Coniston Power Boat Records Week. Meanwhile, Clarkson conducts a comparison review of the Jaguar XJ220 and the Bugatti EB 110 Super Sport at the Eboladrome, and Penn & Teller compete against Dynamo in "Celebrity Face Off".
23	10	"Oh, Canada"	Uselessness of small SUVs: (Alfa Romeo Stelvio Quadrifoglio, Range Rover Velar P380, Porsche Macan Turbo Performance Pack, Ford F150 Raptor)	Tesla Model X	Rory McIlroy, Paris Hilton	9 February 2018
The presenters head to Canada to with three small SUVs — Clarkson in an Alfa Romeo Stelvio Quadrifoglio, May in a Range Rover Velar P380, and Hammond in a Porsche Macan Turbo Performance Pack — to prove that they are useless in a series of tests that include timed laps, and a towing race up a mountain. Meanwhile, Clarkson reviews the new Tesla Model X at the Eboladrome and on the road, and Rory McIlroy competes against Paris Hilton in the last "Celebrity Face Off".
24	11	"Feed the world"	Delivering fish to a rural village in Mozambique: (Mercedes-Benz 200T, Nissan Hardbody, TVS Star)	N/A	None	16 February 2018
The presenters head to Mozambique on a mission to bring fish from the capital of Maputo to the people of Bingo, using three vehicles they modify for the task — May modifies a Mercedes-Benz 200T Estate with a Perspex tank filled with sea water, Clarkson modifies a Nissan Hardbody truck with an ice machine, and Hammond modifies a TVS Star motorcycle with an attached rack. Along their 200 mile journey, the group endure the terrain and the breakdowns their vehicles face, before facing one more problem when they arrive at their destination.

=== Series 3 (2019) ===
The third series discontinued the involvement of celebrity guests in order to provide more focus on films, and was the last series of regular episodes with studio segments, car reviews and timed laps. In acknowledgement of this format of the programme being brought to a close, the final episode's last segment included a montage of scenes featuring the presenters over the course of their career as a trio – not only from this programme, but also from their time hosting Top Gear.

No. overall	No. in series	Title	Main feature(s)	Vehicles reviewed	Original release date
25	1	"Motown Funk"	Muscle cars in "Motor City": (Ford Mustang RTR Spec 3, Hennessey Exorcist, Dodge Challenger SRT Demon)	McLaren Senna	18 January 2019
The presenters head to Detroit with three American muscle cars — Clarkson in the Ford Mustang RTR Spec 3, May in the Hennessey Exorcist and Hammond in the Dodge Challenger SRT Demon — putting their respective choice through a drag race on a deserted street, conducting a noise test, and racing them around a specially created track in Cadillac's old factory. Meanwhile, Clarkson reviews the McLaren Senna at Thruxton Circuit, before it undergoes a timed lap at the Eboladrome.
26	2	"Colombia Special – Part 1"	Photograph Colombia's wildlife for Amazon's website: (Fiat Panda 4x4 Sisley, Jeep Wrangler, Chevrolet K2500)	N/A	25 January 2019
The presenters undertake a road trip across Colombia, from Cartagena to Santander, to photograph a collection of wildlife in the wild requested for by Amazon as their new screensaver. Each presenter opts for their own vehicle for the task — May brings a Fiat Panda 4x4 Sisley, Clarkson brings a Jeep Wrangler, and Hammond brings a Chevrolet K2500 Monster Truck. In the first part, the group begin their journey by focusing on finding the first animal of their checklist, contending with narrow bridges and jungle terrain along the way.
27	3	"Colombia Special – Part 2"	Photograph Colombia's wildlife for Amazon's website: (Fiat Panda 4x4 Sisley, Jeep Wrangler, Chevrolet K2500)	N/A	26 January 2019
In the second part of their Colombia road trip, the trio make modifications to their vehicles in Bogotá and partake in a football match with their Colombian fixers during the time. As they head southwards for the remaining animals on their list, they find themselves contending with mountains, higher altitudes and severe weather, before their search for the final animal is found to be much easier than expected Notes: All photographs taken in the two-part special were displayed as part of the credits for this episode.
28	4	"Pick Up, Put Downs"	Best European pickups for a third-world country: (Mercedes-Benz X250d, Ford Ranger, Volkswagen Amarok)	Jaguar XE Project 8	1 February 2019
The presenters head to Wales to conduct a comparison review of three European pickups — May uses a Mercedes-Benz X-Class, Hammond the Ford Ranger, and Clarkson the Volkswagen Amarok — in which each presenter's vehicle is tested out with an agriculture challenge and a series of third-world styled challenges. Meanwhile, Clarkson reviews the Jaguar XE Project 8 at the Eboladrome.
29	5	"An Itchy Urus"	Tribute to Jim Clark	Alpine A110, Lamborghini Urus	8 February 2019
Clarkson reviews the Lamborghini Urus in Arjeplog, Sweden, driving it up a ski slope before racing on an ice track against a Porsche 911 Turbo S driven by Eaton. Meanwhile, May reviews the new Alpine A110 at the Eboladrome, and Hammond pays tribute to racing legend Jim Clark.
30	6	"Chinese Food for Thought"	Second-hand western luxury car challenge: (Hongqi L5, Mercedes–Benz S600, Cadillac STS, BMW 750Li)	NIO EP9	15 February 2019
Clarkson travels to Chongqing, China, to review the Hongqi L5, before Hammond and May join him to test out three different second-hand western luxury cars they purchase — May buys a Mercedes–Benz S600, Hammond buys a Cadillac STS, and Clarkson buys a BMW 750iL — putting them through a series of tests regarding handling, luxury, durability and speed. Meanwhile, Hammond reviews the Chinese-built electric NIO EP9 at the Eboladrome (comparing its acceleration to both the Rimac Concept One he crashed filming the first episode of the previous series and the Vampire dragster he crashed filming an episode of Top Gear).
31	7	"Well Aged Scotch"	Scottish road trip in inexpensive rare Italian classics: (Alfa Romeo GTV6, Lancia Gamma Coupe, Fiat X1/9)	BMW M5, Alpina B5	22 February 2019
The presenters visit Inverness with three inexpensive rare Italian classics they like — Clarkson in an Alfa Romeo GTV6, May in a Lancia Gamma Coupe, and Hammond in a Fiat X1/9 — for a road trip around the North Coast 500 to determine which is the best in a comparison test. Meanwhile, Clarkson compares the new BMW M5 to the Alpina B5 at the Eboladrome.
32	8	"International Buffoons' Vacation"	Building RVs for an American holiday: (National RV Tropi-Cal 6350, Fleetwood Pace Arrow, International Harvester S series)	Chevrolet Corvette ZR1, Jeep Grand Cherokee Trackhawk, Cadillac CTS-V	1 March 2019
The presenters head to Nevada for a RV holiday, buying their own and modifying them for a journey across roads and desert terrain, testing them in a series of challenging conditions before racing them in a demolition derby. May converts a National RV Tropi-Cal 6350 into a fully functional English pub, Clarkson transforms a Fleetwood Pace Arrow to appear more yacht-like, complete with a flying bridge on the roof, and Hammond chooses a minimalist approach by installing a tent on an International Harvester flatbed truck. Along the way, the group have a go at dune buggy racing, and conduct a comparison test with three American cars at the Spring Mountain race complex — the Chevrolet Corvette ZR-1 tested by Clarkson, the Jeep Grand Cherokee Trackhawk tested by Hammond and the Cadillac CTS-V tested by May. Notes: Mike Skinner, who had left the show after series 1 ended due to dissatisfaction with his character "The American", makes a one-off return as the character during the RV film. According to the Production notes, this episode served as the prototype for series four, which would move to single-feature adventures.
33	9	"Aston, Astronauts and Angelina's Children"	History of astronauts automobiles	Aston Martin Vantage, Citroën C3 Aircross	8 March 2019
May heads to Florida to look back on the history and events leading up to the Moon Landing Space Mission as he tests out the cars driven by each of the Apollo astronauts. Meanwhile, Hammond reviews the new Aston Martin Vantage at the Eboladrome, while Clarkson extensively reviews the Citroën C3 Aircross with tests across England, France and Italy.
34	10	"The Youth Vote"	Best hot hatches for millennials: (Volkswagen Polo GTI, Ford Fiesta ST, Toyota Yaris GRMN)	Ferrari Testarossa, Lamborghini Countach LP5000	15 March 2019
The presenters see which Hot Hatch they like is the best — Clarkson backs the Volkswagen Polo GTI, Hammond backs the Ford Fiesta ST, and May backs the Toyota Yaris GRMN — by testing them out on the programme's rally track, before conducting campaigns on various social formats to make their choice more appealing to millennials. Meanwhile, May and Hammond head to the Eboladrome to determine which 1980s Italian supercar — the Ferrari Testarossa and the Lamborghini Countach LP5000 — is the best.
35	11	"Sea to Unsalty Sea"	Grand Tour from the Black Sea to the Caspian Sea in GT cars: (Aston Martin DBS Superleggera, Bentley Continental GT, BMW M850i)	N/A	22 March 2019
The presenters conduct a road trip from Georgia to Azerbaijan, to compare three grand tourers — Clarkson uses the Aston Martin DBS Superleggera, Hammond uses the latest Bentley Continental GT, and May uses the BMW M850i. On a journey from the shorelines of the Black Sea to the Caspian Sea, the group take in the scenery of their route while putting their cars through a series of challenges to determine which one is best.
36	12	"Legends and Luggage"	Birthday tribute to the Porsche 917, Speeding up air travel	Lancia Delta Futurista, Lancia Stratos MAT	29 March 2019
May looks over the racing history of the Porsche 917 on its 50th birthday, looking over its performance at the Le Mans 24 Hours with Dickie Attwood, before it is raced at the Circuit of Navarra by Attwood, against a modern Porsche 911 GT2 RS driven by Neel Jani. Meanwhile, two modernised classic Lancias — the Delta Futurista and the Stratos MAT — are reviewed by Clarkson at the Eboladrome, before he and Hammond build their own motorised suitcases to speed up air travel and test them at London Stansted Airport.
37	13	"Survival of the Fattest"	Building and driving a car across Mongolia to civilisation: (Self-constructed vehicle named "John")	N/A	5 April 2019
The presenters take on the difficult challenge of building a kit car in Mongolia, on the border of the Gobi desert, and driving it towards civilization within the city of Mörön. Along with the challenge of making their creation, the group also face the difficulty of limited food and terrain that ranges from deserts, mountains, bogs and rivers, and harsh weather conditions.
38	14	"Funeral for a Ford"	Tribute to the mid-sized Ford saloon: (Ford Cortina, Ford Sierra, Ford Mondeo)	Ford Sierra RS Cosworth	12 April 2019
The presenters pay tribute to the mid-size Ford saloon, with Clarkson and May looking over the history of the Ford Cortina and the generation of cars modelled on the original, while Hammond reviews the Ford Sierra RS Cosworth at the Eboladrome, before joining his colleagues to bid farewell to the Ford Mondeo with a car meet at Lincoln Cathedral. In their final scene, the group pay homage to their involvement in studio based car shows over the last 16 years, since the second series of the reboot of Top Gear. Notes: The episode closes on a montage of memorable moments the presenters were involved in, taken from both Top Gear and The Grand Tour.

=== Series 4 (2019–2021) ===
After the third series the tent format was eliminated and the programme shifted focus entirely onto occasional feature-length specials. Each episode in the series is marketed with the prefix; The Grand Tour Presents...

No. overall	No. in series	Title	Main feature(s)	Original release date
39	1	"Seamen"	Travelling along the Mekong in boats: (Scarab Thunder, PBR (replica), 1939 Wooden Cruiser)	13 December 2019
The presenters travel from Siem Reap along the Tonlé Sap and then Mekong rivers to Vũng Tàu, Vietnam using boats: Hammond pilots a Scarab, Clarkson pilots a custom-made PBR, and May pilots a 1939 Wooden Cruiser.
40	2	"A Massive Hunt"	Travelling across Réunion and Madagascar in modified performance cars: (Bentley Continental GT V8, Ford Focus RS, Caterham 7 310R)	17 December 2020
The presenters head to Réunion in a series of performance cars—Clarkson chooses a Bentley Continental GT V8, Hammond chooses a Ford Focus RS and May chooses a Caterham 7 310R. They are challenged to modify their cars and travel across Madagascar in search of treasure that belonged to the pirate La Buse.
41	3	"Lochdown"	Travelling across Scotland in American Cars: (Lincoln Continental Mark V, Buick Riviera, Cadillac Coupe de Ville, Chrysler Voyager, Chrysler PT Cruiser, Pontiac Aztek, Ford Shelby Mustang GT500, Chevrolet Camaro Z/28, Dodge Charger R/T)	30 July 2021
The trio travel across Scotland, from the English border at Berwick-upon-Tweed to the island of North Uist in the Outer Hebrides, in three large American luxury cars—Clarkson brings a Lincoln Continental Mark V, Hammond brings a Buick Riviera "boattail", and May brings a Cadillac Coupe de Ville—to find out why old American Cars were not popular in Europe. Along the way, the presenters visit Glentruim Castle and drive classic American muscle cars on a shooting trip—Clarkson drives a Ford Shelby Mustang GT500, May drives a Chevrolet Camaro Z/28 and Hammond drives a Dodge Charger R/T—and hold a demolition derby between terrible cars from the United States and ones from the Soviet Union—May drives a Chrysler Voyager, Clarkson uses a Chrysler PT Cruiser and Hammond uses a Pontiac Aztek.
42	4	"Carnage A Trois"	Travelling across England and Wales while analysing French Cars: (Citroën CX Safari, Matra Murena, Renault Avantime, Citroën Berlingo, Renault Scénic, Peugeot 407, Citroën SM)	17 December 2021
The trio drive throughout England and Wales to answer the question: What's the matter with the French? To find out, they test a whole range of French cars including the Citroën SM while also choosing three weird quirky French Cars, Clarkson acquires a Citroën CX Safari, Hammond acquires a Matra Murena and May acquires a Renault Avantime.

=== Series 5 (2022–2024) ===
As with the fourth series, the fifth series continued the focus on feature length specials.

No. overall	No. in series	Title	Main feature(s)	Original release date
43	1	"A Scandi Flick"	Travelling across Scandinavia in Rally-Inspired Saloons: (Subaru Impreza WRX STI, Mitsubishi Lancer Evolution VIII, Audi RS4)	16 September 2022
The trio travel through Norway, Sweden and Finland in three Rally-Inspired Sports Saloons—Hammond purchases a 2004 Subaru Impreza WRX STI, May purchases a 2004 Mitsubishi Lancer Evolution VIII, and Clarkson purchases a 2007 Audi RS4. As they venture across Scandinavia towards the Russian border, they put their cars through their paces in a series of harsh winter tests. During filming, May was injured with a broken rib and bloodied head after he crashed his Evo into a wall at an estimated 65 km/h and was subsequently taken to hospital whilst his co-presenters continued filming until he recovered. The Lancer survived both the crash and an incident where the ice it was on broke partially submerging the front of the car underwater. This special replaced a previously planned episode in northern Russia which was cancelled due to the COVID-19 pandemic.
44	2	"Eurocrash"	Travelling through Central Europe in Weird Cars: (Chevrolet SSR, Mitsuoka Le-Seyde, Crosley CC Convertible, Ford Popular Hot Rod, Škoda 1100 OHC, Praga Bohema, Klein Vision AirCar)	16 June 2023
The trio take a road trip across Central Europe 'that's never been done before' in 'strange cars that nobody buys'—Hammond drives a Chevrolet SSR, Clarkson drives a Mitsuoka Le-Seyde, and May drives a Crosley CC Convertible which proves to be dangerously slow so he temporarily uses the 'Back-up car', a Ford Popular Hot Rod. Starting in Poland—where Hammond takes part in Formula Easter racing—they travel through Slovakia—where Clarkson and May test the Škoda 1100 OHC and Praga Bohema, respectively (also taking observations of the Klein Vision AirCar)—then through Hungary before concluding in Slovenia. Note: Nigel Mansell is credited as a presenter despite only appearing as a wax figure.
45	3	"Sand Job"	Travelling across the Sahara in Modified Exotic GT Convertibles (Maserati GranCabrio, Aston Martin DB9 Volante, Jaguar F-Type)	16 February 2024
The presenters are sent to the Western Sahara Region in a trio of second-hand exotic GT convertibles that they then modify into dune racers—May buys a 2010 Maserati GranCabrio, Hammond buys a 2005 Aston Martin DB9 Volante and Clarkson buys a 2013 Jaguar F-Type. Starting in Mauritania, they travel towards the west coast of Senegal in an attempt to replicate the final leg of the legendary Paris-Dakar Rally. The special ends abruptly due to rioting in Dakar.

=== Series 6 (2024) ===
The sixth series consists of a single feature length episode acting as the finale of the era starring Clarkson, Hammond and May. "One for the Road" was initially intended to be released as the fourth and final episode of the fifth series, but was released as the first and only episode of the sixth series on Amazon Prime Video.

No. overall	No. in series	Title	Main feature(s)	Original release date
46	1	"One for the Road"	Travelling across Zimbabwe in cars they always wanted to own (Triumph Stag, Ford Capri GXL, Lancia Montecarlo)	13 September 2024
For their final ever adventure, Jeremy Clarkson, Richard Hammond, and James May ditch instructions set by Andy Wilman and plan their own adventure. They head to Zimbabwe in cars they've always wanted to own—May brings a Triumph Stag, Hammond brings a Ford Capri GXL and Clarkson brings a Lancia Montecarlo. A red Volkswagen New Beetle was initially presented as the back-up car, which the presenters destroy and replace with their own back-up car, a Rover SD1, echoing back to their first-ever back-up car in the Top Gear: Botswana Special, a white Volkswagen Beetle. The trio travels from the Eastern Highlands through Harare before ending their trip in the border town of Kandalunga and crossing into Botswana. After arriving in Maun, Botswana, Clarkson and May are reunited with the Lancia Beta Coupé and Mercedes-Benz 230E from the Botswana Special while Hammond's Opel Kadett had previously been shipped back to the United Kingdom for restoration. As a call back to the route taken during the Botswana Special, the presenters once again trek the Makgadikgadi Pan before finishing on Kubu Island. Note: This episode marks the end of the 22-year-long collaboration of Clarkson, Hammond, and May across both Top Gear and The Grand Tour. The end credits feature a collection of soundbites from the presenters across their collaborations and a series of photographs of the cast and crew.
