= Tom Davin =

American businessman (1957–2025)

- Born: October 4, 1957; New York City, U.S.
- Died: September 1, 2025 (aged 67); Newport Beach, California, U.S.
- Education: Duke University; Harvard Business School
- Occupation: Businessman
- Known for: CEO of Black Rifle Coffee Company, President & CEO of Panda Restaurant Group, COO of Taco Bell Corporation

Tom Davin (October 4, 1957 – September 1, 2025) was an American businessman who was CEO of Black Rifle Coffee Company in his later years, President & CEO of Panda Restaurant Group from 2004 to 2009, and COO of Taco Bell Corporation from 1996 to 2000.

== Background ==
Davin graduated from Duke University Trinity in 1979, where he played lacrosse and was a member of the Sigma Chi fraternity. He then joined the military where he served four years of infantry command assignments including roles as a company commander in 1st Recon Battalion and 3rd Recon Battalion, followed by selection to become an infantry tactics instructor at the USMC officer course, The Basic School, in Quantico VA. Davin obtained the rank of captain. He then attended Harvard Business School, graduating in 1987 with an MBA.

Davin was based in Newport Beach, California. He died on September 1, 2025, at the age of 67, from ALS.

== Career ==
Davin began his business career in the mergers group of Goldman Sachs and PepsiCo. He served as Chief Operating Officer of Taco Bell Corporation from 1996 to 2000. From August 2004 to November 2009, Davin served as the CEO of Panda Restaurant Group. Later, in 2010, he became the CEO of 5.11 Tactical until his retirement on 4 September 2018. Tom Davin was working with Black Rifle Coffee Company as Co-CEO alongside former Green Beret and founding CEO Evan Hafer until his death.
