= Ross Patterson =

American actor, podcaster, and author

- Born: February 25, 1977 (age 49); Alpharetta, Georgia, United States
- Occupations: Actor; author; podcaster
- Spouse: Jessie Wiseman

Ross Patterson is an American actor and author. He has appeared in over 20 films, including the comedies The New Guy (2002), Accepted, and The Darwin Awards (both 2006). Ross has also written, starred in, and produced six films: 7-Ten Split (2007), Screwball: The Ted Whitfield Story, Darnell Dawkins: Mouth Guitar Legend (both 2010), Poolboy: Drowning Out the Fury (2011), $50K and a Call Girl: A Love Story (2014), and FDR: American Badass! (2012). He is currently the co-host of the Drinkin' Bros podcast with Dan Holloway.

Along with Mat Best and Nils Parker, Patterson co-authored the 2019 book Thank You for My Service, which appeared on the New York Times Best Seller list.

== Podcasts ==
Ross Patterson hosts the Drinkin' Bros. podcast alongside U.S. Military veterans Dan "Danthony" Hollaway and Jarred "Cat Puke" Taylor, and the Ross Patterson Revolution podcast with his wife, Jessie Wiseman.

== Novel ==
Ross Patterson's first novel, At Night She Cries, While He Rides His Steed was released by Regan Arts on June 9, 2015. The novel is billed as the first ever "romance novel for dudes".

== Film ==
Ross Patterson can be seen as the fast talking Hollywood music producer Joey Zane in the 2008 film Garden Party which opened on July 11, 2008, in Los Angeles, New York, Portland, and Seattle.

Patterson was nominated for an MTV Movies Award for Best Spoof in 2008.

Patterson finished filming Darnell Dawkins: Mouth Guitar Legend in January 2010. The film is based on the popular YouTube short film of the same name that has garnered over 800,000 views. He wrote, starred, and produced this film.

Poolboy: Drowning Out the Fury starring opposite Danny Trejo, Jason Mewes, and Kevin Sorbo, was supposedly made in 1990, but only released to the public in 2013.

Screwball: The Ted Whitfield Story was released, October 1, 2010. The plot involves a major-league baseball strike in 1994 which gives the sport of Wiffle Ball a chance to take the spotlight. Ted Whitfield, a star player, is played by Patterson.

Patterson wrote and produced FDR: American Badass! playing a role opposite Barry Bostwick (FDR) and Bruce McGill. Production started December 6, 2010 in Los Angeles and features the 32nd president of the United States riding a "wheelchair of death" to stop the world from werewolves who carry the polio virus, including werewolf versions of Hitler, Mussolini, and Emperor Hirohito.FDR: American Badass! was designated, "One of the 25 Weirdest Films Streaming on Netflix Right Now", by critics in 2013.

Ross Patterson's pilot St. James St. James Presents: Delirium Cinema earned the "Out of the Box" award in the 2011 New York Television Festival. The IFC (U.S. TV channel) sponsored the category and the prize was a development deal with the network. Patterson created, wrote, starred, and produced the show which features a director looking back at the 200 worst films ever made.

$50K and a Call Girl: A Love Story is in post-production. Patterson stars with actress Jessie Wiseman and rapper Asher Roth. Patterson writes, stars, and produces in this film as well. The film is directed by Seth Grossman.

Ross Patterson wrote, produced, and directed the action comedy film Helen Keller vs. Nightwolves, which was released on October 31, 2015. This film depicts a fictional account of how Helen Keller lost her hearing and sight due to night wolves that terrorized her town, and she decides to fight back. The film stars actress Jessie Wiseman, actress Lin Shaye, and actor Barry Bostwick.

In 2015, he produced and directed, as well as starred in Range 15, in collaboration with the apparel companies, Ranger Up and Article 15 Clothing. Financing for the film was generated through an Indiegogo campaign started by the two apparel companies; over $1 million was raised. The movie was released in June 2016.
