= Range 15 =

- Poster
- Directed by: Ross Patterson
- Written by: Billy Jay; Nick Palmisciano; Ross Patterson
- Produced by: Ross Patterson
- Starring: Mat Best; Ross Patterson; Nick Palmisciano; Jarred Taylor; Jack Mandaville; Vincent Vargas
- Cinematography: Jesus Hernandez
- Edited by: Adam Beamer
- Music by: Peter Bateman
- Production company: Street Justice Films
- Release date: June 15, 2016
- Running time: 92 min
- Country: United States
- Language: English
- Budget: US$1.5 million

Range 15 is a zombie comedy film. Released on June 15, 2016, the movie is a collaboration between the veteran-run, military-themed apparel companies Ranger Up and Article 15 Clothing, and stars many of their staff members. The movie was produced and directed by Ross Patterson.

== Plot ==
After a night of debauchery, five military comrades (Mat Best, Nick Palmisciano, Jarred Taylor, Jack Mandaville, and Vincent “Rocco” Vargas) wake up in a drunk tank after assaulting a transgender woman, only to find out that while they were passed out in their cell, a zombie apocalypse has begun and they realize that when they see a zombified Richard Chindler (William Shatner) who tries to attack Rocco, though Rocco quickly kills him with a hit to the head. Instead of panicking, the group is ecstatic and thrilled about the zombie apocalypse. After killing the zombified transgender woman and seeing the events currently going on outside such as Marcus Luttrell being attacked and devoured by zombies, the group then prepares by arming themselves with batons acquired from the police station in which they were being held. As they make their way, they find a mortally wounded soldier who tells them that they need to get to Range 15 but before they can get more information from the soldier, he starts turning into a zombie almost biting Jack, but Mat sees this and hits him in the head with a baton killing him.

After a series of encounters with zombies, the group makes it to the police armory where Heather (Jessie Wiseman) and Eliza (Mindy Robinson) have taken the building, lock the doors and refuse them entry. In an exchange in words, Heather eventually lets them inside where they find that she has Evan Hafer cuffed to a chair for not sharing weapons. The group gathers around a map, studying it, when they discover from Heather that Range 15 is a fallback point for an ELE (Extinction-Level Event). The group, now armed with rifles and sidearms they got from the police armory, begin their journey to Range 15 with Heather and Eliza joining them. In need of transportation, the group heads to the impound lot where they then decide to take Jarred's "whiskey truck" that was confiscated the night he was arrested that he uses to move distilled whiskey. Before they depart, Evan, while urinating has his penis ripped off by Zombie Klebba (Martin Klebba) and Mat then shoots Evan in the head. While on the road, the group has another encounter with zombies where they discover that a bad batch of distilled whiskey (it was mixed with Viper semen) is actually the cure for the infected after Rocco tries using a bottle as a Molotov cocktail to incinerate the zombies, but instead it reverts them back to normal. After making this discovery, Nick suggests that Mat take the whiskey over to Colonel Holloway (Keith David), Mat's former Commanding officer, to have it be studied, tested and start mass distribution. Once the group makes it to Holloway with the whiskey, Holloway then has his best man take it over to Range 15 to be tested. Sergeant Major Gene Vandenham (Ross Patterson), an extremely cocky Army Special Forces Soldier who is loved by everyone except Mat, who strongly dislikes him for his high ego.

While en route to Range 15, Vandenham informs the group that Holloway has notified him that the zombies are becoming much faster, stronger, and could possibly overtake their vehicles at any given point, to which end the Colonel has arranged for helicopter transportation to avoid the roads. After engaging more zombies near the helipad, Vandenham decides to stay back and fight off the remaining zombies, trusting the group to get the whiskey to Range 15. Once airborne, it becomes obvious that Pilot Grigsby (Sean Astin) is infected, after which he decides to jump to his death, leaving Jarred to try to land the helicopter. Now on foot to Range 15, a zombie attacks Mat but before it is killed, it manages to bite Mat in the leg. The infection starts spreading faster than usual. Nick and Rocco suggest Mat take the cure anally since the alcohol is absorbed directly into the bloodstream thus taking effect faster than drinking it. Once Mat is cured, the group continues toward their destination and eventually arrive at a Silo which is also the entrance to Range 15 and with no way of knowing how to get in, and zombies closing in, Mat decides to lure the zombies away from his comrades by having them chase him instead, leaving his fate unknown. The remaining group members eventually find a way in (a very obvious button that Jack failed to see next to him). Once inside they then hand the whiskey over to Scientist Hathaway (Jim O'Heir) who then pours some of the distilled whiskey on a zombie he has restrained to a bed to test it but nothing happens. Confused, the group is trying to figure out why it did not work until Eliza pours Kill Cliff on the zombie reverting him back to normal and then goes on to explain the whiskey is the primary element needed but to work it needs an adequate delivery system and Kill Cliff is that delivery system which explains why in every event where the infected are reverted there has been a Kill Cliff attribution. Hathaway then has the whiskey taken to the lab to be replicated as fast as possible to begin distribution.

Mat, who was presumed dead arrives at Range 15 and then explains that he was saved by "The Zombie Slaying Dream Team" which consist of Leroy Petry, Clint Romesha, Tim Kennedy, and Tom Amenta. 2LT Chandler then informs them that the zombies are breaching in and that the doors would not hold them back. They then head to fight the zombies but not before Tom Amenta shoots Eliza in the head for not knowing who Leroy Petry and Clint Romesha (Both Medal of Honor recipients) are and why they are heroes. After stopping various waves of zombies, a zombified Randy Couture appears who they dubbed Zombie Couture to which Tim Kennedy takes it upon himself to take on Couture with him being Victorious in the end. In the final battle the group take on Zombie Trejo (Danny Trejo) who single-handedly overpowers every one of them until Mat eventually manages to slice his throat, killing him. After the events at Range 15, the group returns to Colonel Holloway who then tells them that they are to be honored by the president. At the ceremony, President Mattis (Dale Dye) is about to acknowledge the man who saved mankind with Mat and his comrades thinking it is him only to be revealed that president was talking about Sergeant Major Gene Vandenham, much to Mat's frustration. In the last scene Rocco is seen returning to a gas station they stopped by earlier in the film while on their way to meet Colonel Holloway. He is then greeted by a zombie he fell in love with after they had a sexual encounter at the gas station diner. They share a kiss and he then picks her up and walks into the sunset.

== Cast ==
=== Veterans ===
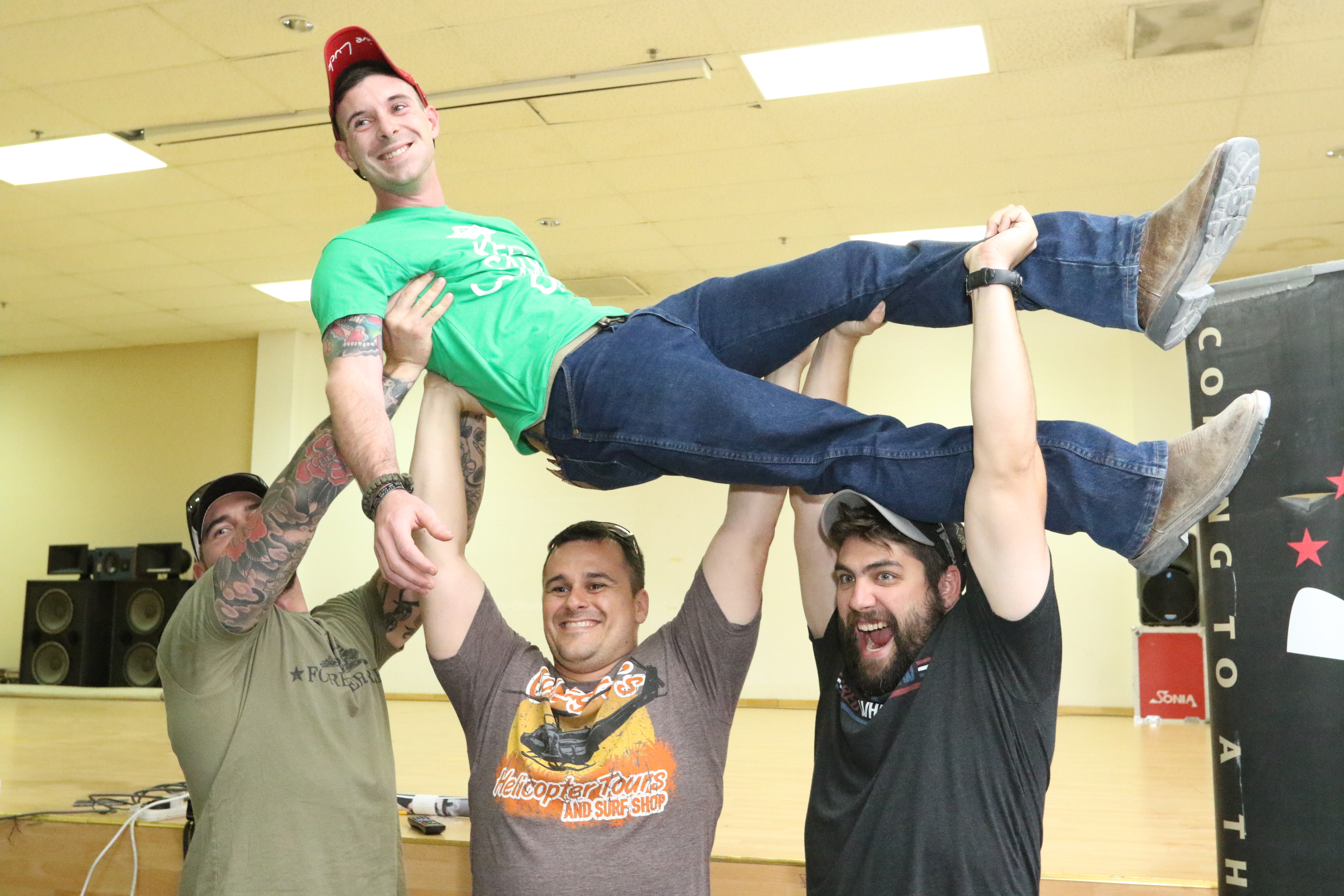
- Range 15 actors and veterans Matt Best, left, Nick Palmisciano and Jarred “J.T.” Taylor hoist Sgt. Kurtis Cheatham, 530th MP Company, into the air during a screening July 14 at Camp Arifjan, Kuwait.
- Mat Best (Internet personality, Actor, Entrepreneur, and Co-Founder of Article 15 Clothing and, Black Rifle Coffee Company) as Himself
- Nick Palmisciano (Ranger Up Founder) as Himself
- Jarred Taylor (Co-Founder of Article 15 Clothing) as Himself
- Jack Mandaville (Writer, Actor, and Producer) as Himself
- Vincent “Rocco” Vargas (Actor, Writer and Producer) as Himself
- Tim Kennedy (Retired MMA Fighter) as Himself
- Randy Couture (Actor, and Retired MMA Fighter) as Zombie Couture
- Marcus Luttrell (Navy Cross Recipient, and author of Lone Survivor) as Himself
- Leroy Petry (Medal of Honor Recipient) as Himself
- Clinton Romesha (Medal of Honor Recipient) as Himself
- Dale Dye (Actor, Technical Advisor, Radio Personality, and Writer) as President Mattis
- Evan Hafer (Black Rifle Coffee Company Co-Founder) as Himself
- Brian Stann (Silver Star Recipient, and retired MMA Fighter) as Himself
- Spencer Stone (Airman's Medal Recipient) as Himself
- Alek Skarlatos (Soldier's Medal Recipient) as Himself
- Rob Vardaro (Actor) as Fatally Wounded Stolen Valor Man
- Tom Amenta (Businessman, and Actor) as Himself
- Mary Dague (Iraq War Veteran, Double Amputee, and Actress) as Herself

=== Miscellaneous ===
- Mindy Robinson as Eliza
- Jessie Wiseman as Heather
- Ross Patterson as Sergeant Major Gene Vandenham
- Sean Astin as Pilot Grigsby
- Danny Trejo as Zombie Trejo
- Keith David as Colonel Holloway
- William Shatner as Richard Chindler
- Bryan Callen as Guard Callen
- Martin Klebba as Zombie Klebba
- Jim O'Heir as Scientist Hathaway
- Brendan Schaub as Patrick "Fat Patrick"
- Richard Riehle as Sheriff's Deputy
- Mike Goldberg as Himself
- Jesse Merlin as 2LT Chandler

== Production ==
The inspiration for making Range 15 was dissatisfaction with the way military are portrayed in many Hollywood movies including characterization of servicemembers and inaccuracies in uniforms and use of weapons.

Dakota Meyer, Leroy Petry (both Medal of Honor recipients) and Army Green Beret and UFC fighter, Tim Kennedy participated in the launch video, with Former Navy SEAL Marcus Luttrell and Clint Romesha joining the film's cast. Meyer would later drop out of the film Additional actors signed on included Danny Trejo, Keith David, Dale Dye, Jim O'Heir and William Shatner eventually joined the cast.

Ranger Up and Article 15 Clothing launched a crowd-sourcing campaign for Range 15 on Indiegogo in May 2015. The initial goal of the campaign was set at US$325,000, which was needed to move forward with production of the film. This was in addition to the US$250,000 that each company had already committed to the film. The two companies utilized social media and a large assortment of perk packages to garner support for the film. Perks ranged from digital downloads of the film, executive producer credit, being an extra in the film and being the film's ultimate hero. Within the first 24 hours, the campaign raised over US$120,000 and within a week, reached the initial goal.

In June 2015, Range 15 was the 5th highest crowd sourced film on Indiegogo. The campaign eventually exceeded US$1 million, making it the 4th largest campaign ever on Indiegogo.

Principal photography began on October 5, 2015. Filming was completed in two weeks and wrapped in mid-October 2015.

== Release ==
The Range 15 world premiere was held on May 27, 2016, at the GI Film Festival in Washington, D.C., where the film received the 2016 GI Choice Film Award. The public release was scheduled for June 15, 2016, in select theaters across the country. The list of theaters showing Range 15 was released on April 15, 2016. Advanced screenings were conducted at Fort Bragg, North Carolina and Fort Hood, Texas.

During the premier release in Hollywood June 3, 2016 leading actor Mat Best fell and severely injured his left hand.

=== Marketing ===
The red band trailer for the movie debuted at the Sundance Film Festival on January 25, 2016, and was released to the public via Facebook and YouTube on January 26, 2016. Range 15 grossed a total of $463,397.
