= The Grand Tour =

British motoring television series

- Genre: Motoring; Entertainment
- Created by: Jeremy Clarkson; Richard Hammond; James May; Andy Wilman
- Written by: Jeremy Clarkson; Richard Hammond; James May; Richard Porter
- Directed by: Phil Churchward; Brian Klein; Kit Lynch-Robinson; Gavin Whitehead
- Presented by: Jeremy Clarkson; Richard Hammond; James May
- Starring: Mike Skinner; Abbie Eaton
- Theme music composer: Matt Clifford
- Composer: Paul Leonard-Morgan
- Country of origin: United Kingdom
- Original language: English
- No. of series: 6
- No. of episodes: 46 (list of episodes)

Production
- Executive producer: Andy Wilman
- Producers: Chris Hale; Greg Vince; Richard Evans; Ronan Browne
- Cinematography: Ben Joiner
- Editors: James Hart; Dan James; Chris Denton; Joe Orr
- Camera setup: Multi-camera
- Running time: 44–135 minutes
- Production companies: W. Chump & Sons Ltd; Expectation Entertainment (2019–2023); Grand Tour Productions Ltd (2019–2023); Flat Four Films Ltd (2024)

Original release
- Network: Amazon Prime Video
- Release: 18 November 2016 – 13 September 2024

Related
- Top Gear (2002 series); The Grand Tour (2026)

The Grand Tour

YouTube information
- Channel: The Grand Tour
- Subscribers: 2.71 million
- Views: 1.35 billion
- Last updated: 10 September 2026

The Grand Tour is a British motoring television series, created by Jeremy Clarkson, Richard Hammond, James May, and Andy Wilman, for Amazon Prime Video, and premiered on 18 November 2016. The programme was devised in the wake of the departure of Clarkson, Hammond, May, and Wilman from the BBC television series Top Gear with an initial order of 36 episodes that were released over three years.

The show initially followed a format similar to Top Gear, including car reviews and timed laps, motoring challenges and races, studio segments, and celebrity guests, with the team using a studio within a large tent during this time; in its first series, the tent was located at different locations across the globe before taking a fixed site within the Cotswolds. Segments and road trip specials have been filmed in various locations worldwide, including across Europe, Africa, the Americas, and Asia. After the conclusion of the third series, the production team switched out of this format, and towards a focus on producing special motoring films for future series, with individual episodes released at select intervals.

The Grand Tour has received generally positive reviews from critics, with praise for the chemistry of its original presenters and strong production values. It is one of Prime Video's most viewed original series, setting viewership records with several of its episodes. It is also one of its most expensive series by production budget. A video game based on the programme, The Grand Tour Game, was released on 15 January 2019.

The final episode featuring Clarkson, Hammond, and May as presenters was released on 13 September 2024, ending the trio’s 22-year-long partnership. The show was rebooted in 2026 with a new presenting line-up.

== Format ==
=== Series 1–3 (2016–2019): Studio format ===
Throughout the first three series of the programme, the format was focused on a similar arrangement to that of Top Gear, involving a mixture of pre-recording television films – a mixture of single or multi-part films – and live-audience studio segments, though for legal reasons it was designed with significant differences to avoid clashing with the BBC's motoring series. Films focused primarily on car review, motoring challenges, and road trip journeys, often in similar mould to those seen in Top Gear, such as a challenge in which the presenters have to purchase a class of a vehicle and see which is the best through a series of tests given through text messages from the show's producer. Alongside these episodes, the programme's format between 2016 and 2019 also included special episodes in similar format to Top Gear specials, focused on the presenters on journeys in a specific type of vehicle or class all over the planet.

Timed Lap Board
Car (track condition): 1st-13th	Time	Car (track condition): 14th-26th	Time	Car (track condition): 27th-39th	Time
McLaren Senna	1:12.9	Nissan GT-R	1:21.2	Honda Civic Type R	1:28.2
NIO EP9	1:15.0	Porsche 911 C2S	1:21.4	Ford Focus RS	1:28.4
Aston Martin Vulcan	1:15.5	Alpina B5	1:21.6	Lexus GS-F (damp)	1:29.6
Lamborghini Huracán Performante	1:16.8	MAT Stratos	1:21.6	Ford Mustang GT	1:29.6
Ford GT	1:17.6	BMW M4 GTS	1:22.4	Tesla Model X	1:29.6
McLaren 650S	1:17.9	Porsche 718 Boxster S	1:23.4	Ford Sierra Cosworth RS500	1:31.3
McLaren 720S	1:17.9	Alpine A110	1:23.7	Lamborghini Countach (wet)	1:31.8
Mercedes AMG GT R	1:18.7	BMW M5	1:24.2	Ford Fiesta ST200	1:32.8
Audi R8 V10 Plus	1:19.2	BMW M3	1:24.3	Bugatti EB 110 Super Sport (wet)	1:32.8
Jaguar XE Project 8	1:19.3	Honda NSX (wet)	1:26.0	Fiat Abarth 124 Spider (wet)	1:33.7
Aston Martin V8 Vantage	1:20.4	BMW M2	1:26.2	Jaguar XJ220 (wet)	1:35.1
BMW M5	1:20.4	Delta Futurista	1:26.8	Ferrari Testarossa (wet)	1:37.4
Porsche 911 GT3 RS	1:20.4	Alfa Romeo Giulia Quadrifoglio (wet)	1:27.1	Volkswagen Up! GTI (wet)	1:39.7

Celebrity Timed Lap board
Celebrity	Time	Condition	Episode
(England) Kevin Pietersen	1:17.2	Dry	15
(United States) Brian Wilson	1:17.5	Dry	15
(Canada) Kiefer Sutherland	1:17.8	Dry	19
(United States) Casey Anderson	1:18.6	Dry	16
(England) Anthony Joshua	1:18.7	Dry	20
(England) Ricky Wilson	1:20.1	Dry	14
(United States) Bill Goldberg	1:20.4	Dry	20
(Wales) Luke Evans	1:21.3	Dry	19
(England) Nick Mason	1:21.3	Dry	21
(Northern Ireland) Rory McIlroy	1:21.9	Wet	23
(England) Hugh Bonneville	1:22.2	Dry	16
(England) Michael Ball	1:23.3	Damp	17
(England) Dominic Cooper	1:23.6	Wet	18
(United States) David Hasselhoff	1:24.1	Dry	14
(United States) Stewart Copeland	1:24.2	Dry	21
(England) Alfie Boe	1:24.4	Damp	17
(England) Bill Bailey	1:25.1	Wet	18
(United States) Paris Hilton	1:25.8	Wet	23
(United States) Penn & Teller	1:33.8	Snow	22
(England) Dynamo	1:39.3	Snow	22

Like Top Gear, car reviews on The Grand Tour functioned in a similar manner in which the presenters, either on their own or with their colleagues, take a look at various cars and test them out on various aspects such as performance, handling, and quality. Reviews are conducted in varying locales abroad, or within the United Kingdom, including a specially designed racetrack, parallel to the Top Gear Test Track, called the "Eboladrome". The track was not only used for reviews, but also for conducting timed laps of vehicles that are reviewed, except for ten cars which were timed outside of filming before the launch of the first series. Timed laps are conducted by a professional driver assigned to the programme – while the first series involved former NASCAR driver Mike Skinner, who was contracted to operate under the name "The American" and portray a stereotypical redneck accent and viewpoints alongside scripted character traits, the poor reception to his involvement led to him being replaced by British racing driver Abbie Eaton for the second and third series.

Studio segments were primarily filmed within a large studio tent that could house an audience of around 300, with the presenters sat around a trestle table and the audience seated in front of them. Initially, the first series involved these segments being filmed within a travelling tent that was set up in various countries, with audiences acquired from the local population at the site as part of an emphasis that the programme was on a "grand tour" around the world. However, Hammond's crash in Switzerland and Clarkson's pneumonia prior to the second series, led to the use of a travelling tent being dropped in favour of a more fixed location, resulting in studio segments being filmed on the outskirts of Chipping Norton for the second and third series. These live-audience segments act as breaks between pre-recorded films, much like in Top Gear, and operated on a similar format. Throughout all three series, the presenters often used a discussion period on various topics within a segment entitled "Conversation Street", which had a running gag of opening with an intro of the presenters in silhouette doing something comedic and/or unusual.

Celebrities were not initially part of the programme to begin with, due to concerns over legal issues that the BBC could raise if it competed against the celebrity format used in Top Gear. As such, the programme created a humorous segment for the first series entitled "Celebrity Brain Crash", which involved celebrities being "killed" in an accident while making their way to the presenter's tent - the segment was done for comedic effect, and either involved an actual celebrity who was filmed briefly for the segment before their death is staged outside the tent's location or with a look-alike, or involving someone representing them, despite not being clearly identifiable. This segment was later dropped leading to the decision that celebrities would be a part of the programme for the second series in a new segment entitled "Celebrity Face Off". Much like Top Gear's "Star in a Reasonably Priced Car", the segment involved two celebrities, who shared similar backgrounds or connections to certain elements (e.g. magicians) who competed against each other on a separate race track, to see who was the fastest, alongside conducting interviews with the presenters. The timed laps for this segment not only involved a different track, but also used a Jaguar F-Type R-Dynamic coupe to create the lap time. The use of celebrities was later dropped prior to filming of the third series, to dedicate more time to films.

==== The Grand Tour race tracks ====
The "Eboladrome" test track at RAF Wroughton, used on The Grand Tour between 2016 and 2019 for timed laps of reviewed cars.

The gravel course at Enstone Airfield, used on The Grand Tour for "Celebrity Face Off", but only for the second series.

When the programme was first conceived and created, the production team opted for the creation of a dedicated test track for the purpose of being used for reviews of testing of vehicles by presenters, alongside the establishment of lap times by cars that are reviewed. The track was eventually sited at the former RAF Wroughton airbase, with its layout consisting of two loops - one large and one small - connected by a single stretch of tarmac between them and christened as the "Eboladrome", due to the design of the track resembling the structure of the Ebola virus. The track was designed to "trip cars up" and included sections devised under a humorous arrangement, such as "Isn't Straight", "Your Name Here", "Old Lady's House", "Substation" and "Field of Sheep". The track was dropped from use from the programme after the third series.

For the second series, the production team decided to create a second track for the specific purpose of being used in the newly created celebrity segment "Celebrity Face Off". They eventually decided to situate the new track at Enstone Airfield, close to the fixed studio tent location - a site originally planned for use with Top Gear. The track was mostly designed as an oval, with half of it involving a gravel track. The track was dropped from use after the second series, although was briefly involved in a motoring challenge during the third series.

=== Series 4–6 (2019–2024): Roadtrip specials ===
On 13 December 2018, Amazon announced that The Grand Tour had been renewed for a fourth series. With this, Amazon and the production team retired the studio and audience format in favour of films dedicated to road trips and adventure specials. The new format focuses on these individual adventures which see the presenters travelling from one location to another in a selection of vehicles they have chosen for the task, in a similar manner to the feature-length specials of Top Gear, though expanding beyond cars, as did Top Gear on occasion.

The first episode, titled "Seamen", was filmed on the Mekong Delta in Cambodia and Vietnam and released on 13 December 2019. A second episode, titled "A Massive Hunt", was filmed in Réunion and Madagascar. It was originally set to be released on 18 December 2020 but was released a day ahead of schedule on 17 December 2020. A third episode, titled "Lochdown", was filmed in Scotland in October 2020 and was released on 30 July 2021. A fourth episode, titled "Carnage A Trois", was filmed in the United Kingdom in early 2021 and was released on 17 December 2021 as the final episode of the fourth series.

A fifth episode was originally scheduled to be filmed outside of the United Kingdom in mid-2021; however, due to the COVID-19 pandemic, travel restrictions meant this could not happen until March 2022, when filming for the fifth episode began in Norway before travelling through Sweden and concluding in Finland. Titled "A Scandi Flick", it was released on 16 September 2022, as the first episode of the fifth series. In June 2022, filming for the sixth episode began in Poland before travelling through Czech Republic, Slovakia, Hungary and concluding in Slovenia. Titled "Eurocrash", it was released on 16 June 2023. In May 2023, filming for a seventh episode began in Mauritania and concluded in Senegal. Titled "Sand Job", it was released on 16 February 2024 as the final episode of the fifth series.

In September 2023, filming for an eighth episode began in Zimbabwe, which concluded in Botswana. Titled "One for the Road", it was released on 13 September 2024 as the only episode of the sixth series. The episode marks the end of Clarkson, Hammond, and May's working collaboration after 22 years.

== Episodes ==
Series	Episodes	Originally released	
Series	Episodes	First released	Last released
1	13	18 November 2016	3 February 2017
2	11	8 December 2017	16 February 2018
3	14	18 January 2019	12 April 2019
4	4	13 December 2019	17 December 2021
5	3	16 September 2022	16 February 2024
6	1	13 September 2024	

== Production ==
=== History ===
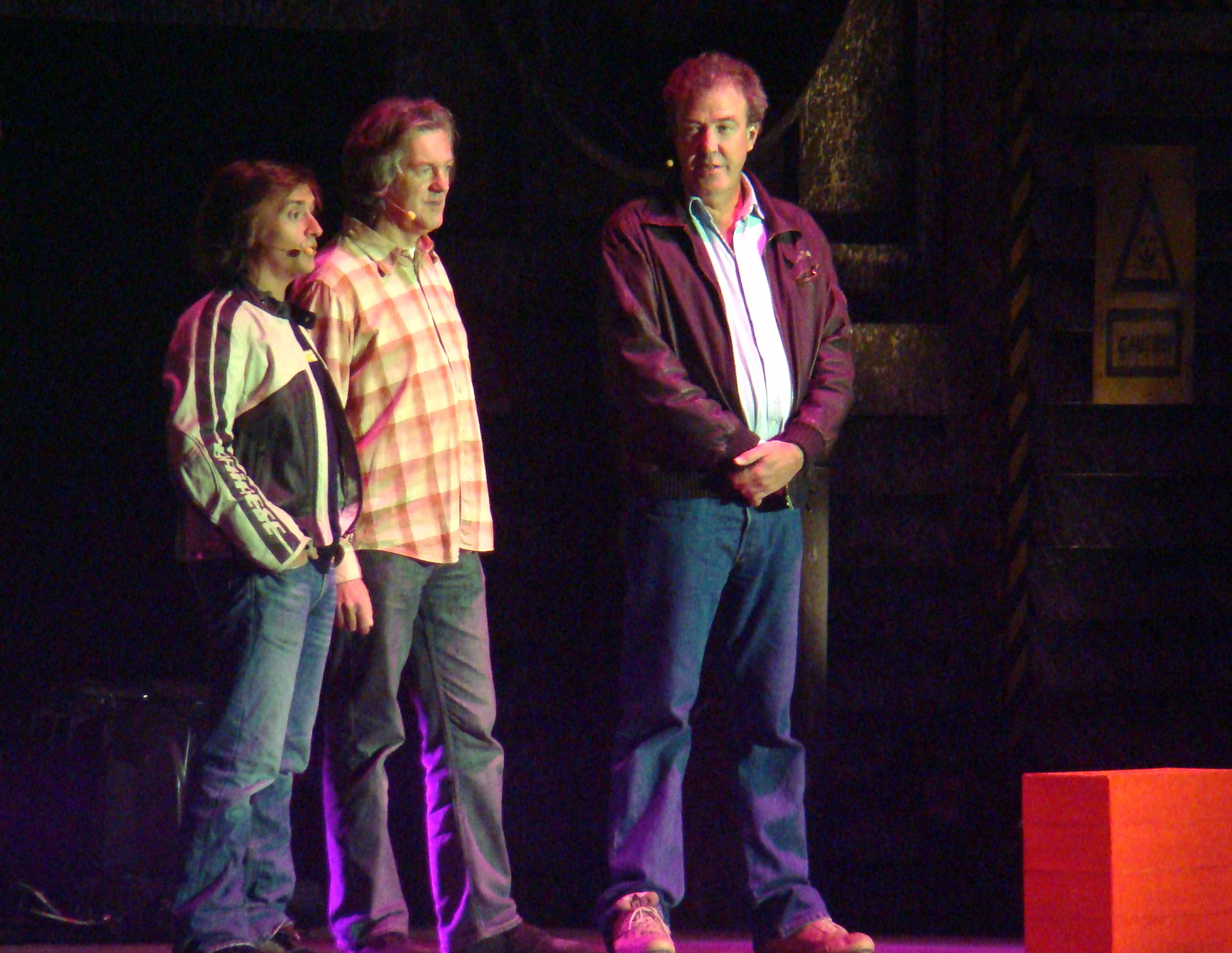
The presenting line-up originally consisted of Richard Hammond, James May and Jeremy Clarkson.

Clarkson, Hammond and May had been presenters on BBC's Top Gear. In May and Clarkson's case they had served as part of the rotating hosts of the original Top Gear, with all three including Hammond being permanent hosts for the 2002 rebooted series from the second series in 2003 (Jason Dawe having presented series one of the rebooted show alongside Clarkson and Hammond instead of May) up to the twenty second series in 2015. Under them, the show had an estimated worldwide audience of 350 million, and listed by Guinness World Records as the highest-viewed factual television programme. Due to several incidents involving Clarkson, the BBC chose not to renew Clarkson's contract with the show in March 2015. Both May and Hammond affirmed they would not return to Top Gear without Clarkson, even though the BBC offered them lucrative salaries to remain on for additional series. Along with their departure, their long-time producer and Clarkson's classmate Andy Wilman also opted to leave at this time. BBC retooled the show for 2016, bringing in a new line up of hosts.

Shortly after his separation from the BBC, Clarkson stated his intent to start a new car show, saying "I have lost my baby but I shall create another. I don't know who the other parent will be or what the baby will be like." Rumours that Clarkson, Hammond, and May were developing a new show through discreet meetings with various networks emerged starting in April 2015. These rumours pointed to a potential American broadcaster, as the terms of Clarkson's non-compete clause with the BBC stipulated he could not make a rival car show with a BBC competitor, such as ITV. Among those that had been approached included Netflix, who felt Clarkson's team wanted too much money for what they were worth, and BT Sport, believing this show would be a better fit on a network with a more global reach.

In July 2015, Clarkson announced he had signed a deal with Amazon to develop a new car show that followed a similar format to Top Gear, with both Hammond and May joining him as co-hosts, and Wilman producing. Other personnel from Top Gear going to the new show included director Phil Churchward, the husband of Fifth Gear's Vicki Butler-Henderson. The deal included 36 episodes across three series which would be available to Amazon Prime members starting in 2016. Wilman stated that Amazon promised them to have the freedom they wanted to make the show how they wanted along with the necessary budget. Additionally, by using a subscription-based service over an advert-based network, they would not be beholden to commercial pressure from their advertisers. Jeff Bezos, CEO of Amazon, said he was "very excited" about bringing this programme to Amazon, and that producing the show would be "very, very, very expensive", but added, "[Clarkson, Hammond and May are] worth a lot and they know it." According to insider information reported by The Daily Mirror, Amazon paid £160 million for all three series. Wilman denied the show cost this much, but did admit the show was costly, partially due to Amazon's intent to have it filmed in 4K resolutions. The production of this show would be based in the United Kingdom, and done by W Chump & Sons, a company set up by Wilman, Clarkson, Hammond and May.

The show's name, The Grand Tour, was revealed in May 2016. Clarkson said the name brought to mind the tradition of Grand Tours, and reflected how the show would travel to several different countries to film. There was speculation that the show could be called Gear Knobs after a trademark application was made for that name by an associated company, but Clarkson stated in October 2015 that this would not be the title. He explained in April 2016 that the word "Gear" could not be used for legal reasons.

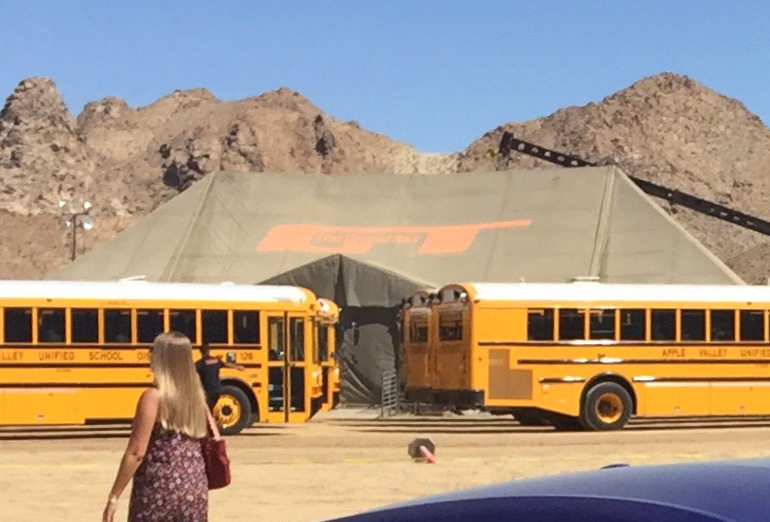
The Grand Tour tent behind school buses in Lucerne Valley, California for the first episode of series 1

Initially, the show's format was to present individual television films, using location shooting without studio segments. They later came up with the idea of using a travelling tent to provide a mobile "studio", to go along with The Grand Tour name. They would be able to use local audience members, and would give the hosts the opportunity to explore the local culture around cars. According to Wilman, the idea to film audience segments in a tent came from Clarkson, who had seen an episode of True Detective that took place at a Baptist revival ceremony.

On 13 December 2018, while shooting the final episode for Series 3, it was announced that the show had been renewed for a fourth series. However they would retire the tent format and instead focus on large budget car specials, on staggered dates rather than regular episodes.

=== Legal issues ===
Wilman said that lawyers for Amazon were very mindful of any perceived similarities in segments to Top Gear, requiring changes to the format and regular segments. Named elements from Top Gear like The Star in a Reasonably Priced Car, the Cool Wall, and the Stig could not be used at all, but they also had to clear other legal concerns. For example, the lawyers said they could test cars on a test track, but they could not post the times using hand-written signs as they had done on Top Gear; instead, they used a digital leaderboard. Wilman said that some of the lawyers' concerns "got funnier and funnier", such as whether May could say "cock", or whether during one of their exotic roadtrips, if they could stop and admire the scenery by saying "it's beautiful" as they frequently did on Top Gear.

Many outlets falsely reported that the BBC had explicitly told the crew they could not have celebrities come on the show and race around a track. This was later confirmed to be false, with the crew admitting that the real reason for the nature of the segment was a last-minute panic.

"Celebrity Brain Crash" was replaced in series two by "Celebrity Face Off" where two celebrities compete to be the fastest around a track, avoiding legal complications with the BBC.

An episode was censored by Amazon Prime Video in India because it included footage that could have been construed as offensive by the Indian audience. The footage showed a car with a body frame that was made of a cow's bones and organs; removal of the footage resulted in a significant reduction in the length of an episode.

=== Filming ===
During the first series, the studio segments were filmed in various locations around the world. Studio recording for the first series began in Johannesburg, South Africa on 17 July 2016. Recording in the United States took place on 25 September 2016 in Southern California, with further recording taking place in Nashville on 21 November 2016. Studio recording in the United Kingdom took place in Whitby on 13 October 2016, with further recordings taking place at Loch Ness in December 2016. Further studio recording took place in Rotterdam on 22 October 2016 and Lapland on 3 November 2016. Stuttgart (Ludwigsburg) was also a filming location. The final studio filming took place in Dubai in December 2016.

For the second series, following Clarkson's pneumonia and Hammond's car crash, the producers decided that there would no longer be a travelling tent. Instead the tent would be in one location near Clarkson's home in the Cotswolds as this would be more convenient for the crew to operate. It also would be useful for new features such as Celebrity Face Off. In September 2017, West Oxfordshire District Council gave planning permission for three months of filming from a fixed tent location on the Great Tew Estate, near Chipping Norton. Two hundred parking spaces already used for hosting the Cornbury Music Festival on the same site would be used to accommodate 350 guests per week, plus 80 members of staff. The time window allowed for the series 2 filming was between October and December 2017. For the third series, the tent was allowed to remain at the Great Tew Estate, with filming taking place between October and December 2018.

Filming for the fourth series began in June 2019. Clarkson made the announcement on Instagram. By mid-June, filming had taken place in Cambodia. Later that month, Clarkson, Hammond, and May were spotted filming in Vietnam. Another fourth series special was shot in Madagascar around November 2019, though its post-production to a final product was delayed due to the COVID-19 pandemic. There were plans to film in north Russia in March 2020, but those were delayed for at least a year due to the pandemic.

The final episode featuring Clarkson, Hammond and May was filmed in September 2023 and aired on 13 September 2024 on Amazon Prime Video.

=== Promotion ===
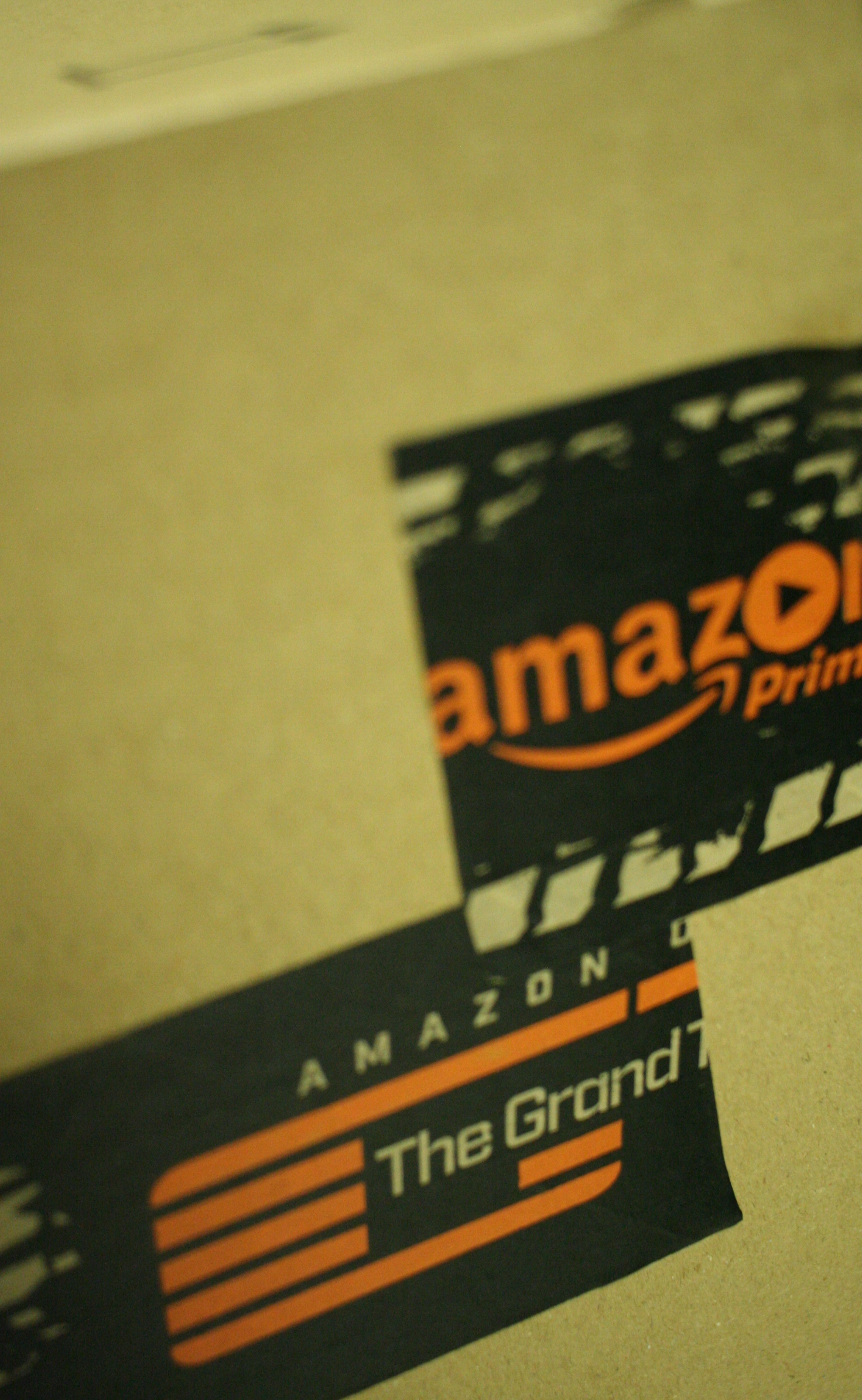
The Grand Tour parcel tape used for orders in November 2016

Following the public naming of the show, Amazon offered new customers a £20 discount for their first year on Amazon Prime during 14–16 May 2016. A trailer announcing the release date of the show as 18 November 2016 was posted on the show's YouTube channel on 15 September 2016. A second, full-length trailer, was released on 6 October 2016. Trailers for series one have used the music "Come with Me Now" by Kongos, while series two trailers have used "Live and Let Die" by Wings.

As part of their marketing campaign, Amazon placed crashed Toyota Prius cars at Hackescher Markt in Berlin, in front of London King's Cross railway station, and on the Hollywood Walk of Fame outside the Dolby Theatre in Los Angeles.

=== Sponsorship ===
In mid-2016 DHL began sponsoring the transport costs of the tent and mobile studio. In June 2016, in connection with the sponsorship deal, the presenters had uploaded videos of themselves attempting to assemble DHL-branded shipping boxes. The first episode stated that "promotional consideration" had been given by the Breitling Jet Team, DHL and Samsung. Eight of the Breitling Jet aircraft took part in the opening sequence flyovers. For episode 2, the list included 5.11 Tactical. A DHL Boeing 757 was featured in the opening sequence of episode 5, the tent was located in Rotterdam and the DHL logo is featured on part of the crash barrier at the Eboladrome.

== Reception ==
As of November 2016 the show has received positive reviews from critics, with The Guardian saying "Jeremy Clarkson and co leave the BBC in their dust". On the review aggregation website Rotten Tomatoes, the first series of The Grand Tour has a "fresh" rating of 86%, based on 7 reviews, with an average rating of 8.0/10. The Grand Tour received a nomination in the Original OTT Streamed category at the 2017 Television and Radio Industries Club Awards.

However, BBC Arts Editor, Will Gompertz said of the opening that "there is no irony. It feels uncomfortably hubristic" but once the presenters were in the tent "Normal service has been resumed" and that "It seemed to me that Grand Tour is a TV show that wants to be – and quite possibly should be – a movie". The Independent described The Grand Tour as "the best of Top Gear but with a greater budget". TheWrap reported an estimate by Symphony Advanced Media that the opening weekend viewer count for The Grand Tour was three times the size of the opening weekend of The Man in the High Castle.

Episode 2 was somewhat less favourably received by fans and critics. The Telegraph wrote about the Jordan segment: "[...] a tedious action movie segment suggested that they were in danger of losing the run of themselves slightly and that Amazon's hands-off policy towards the production had potential downsides." Radio Times said that "many of the viewers were disgruntled to say the least, branding the show as dull and not funny."

Kevin Yeoman of Screen Rant gave the show a positive review, stating "Fans can rest assured Top Gear hasn't gone anywhere, it's just hiding out at Amazon under a different name." Sonia Saraiya of Variety was also positive of the show, stating "When it comes to the cars, The Grand Tour delivers gearhead porn in spades... Clarkson, Hammond, and May's love for machinery... is still present, pure, and appealing, even with the shift in networks and formats."

Conversely, in April 2017 Brad Anderson of CarScoops stated that he prefers Top Gear to The Grand Tour. According to Anderson, Top Gear had "become even better", whereas The Grand Tour "seemed more scripted, less natural and at stages, forced... attention is often skewed away from the cars as the presenters, namely Clarkson, seemed to chase controversy and headlines". Anderson continues that in-studio segments became repetitive quickly, particularly "Celebrity Brain Crash", also noting that all three hosts seem to spend far too much time needling each other, and test driver Mike Skinner offers no worthwhile commentary.

Digital Spy was positive of series 2, episode 1, calling it "An understated premiere for a show that feels like it's finding its feet." The Times was also positive, giving the show 4 out of 5 stars, stating "Some parts of the show are flat but mostly it works, the production values remain high and it has clearly been hit with a juggernaut of money." The Daily Telegraph, while not as positive, still approved of the episode, stating "The writing is still rather ropey. Clarkson's suggestion of a new nickname for May – "Dingleberry Handpump" – failed to raise a titter even among the super-fans gathered for the London premiere" but also said that "for each wobble, there are just as many moments when The Grand Tour manages the clever trick Top Gear could pull off at its best: raising a chuckle while sneaking in a bit of serious journalism at the same time." and ultimately gave the episode 3 out of 5 stars. Jeremy Clarkson himself believed that they had "hit the ground running with series 2 of the Grand Tour".

=== Controversies ===
Richard Hammond was criticised by Stonewall and Peter Tatchell for a comment he made in the sixth episode of the first series where he implied that men who eat ice cream and people who like grilling outside are homosexual. It was later revealed that the comment may have been an in-joke for the Finnish audience as a reference to a controversial TV commercial that aired in Finland many years earlier.

Radio Times criticised the gender balance of guests on the "Celebrity Face Off" segment during an episode, with Paris Hilton as the only female guest.

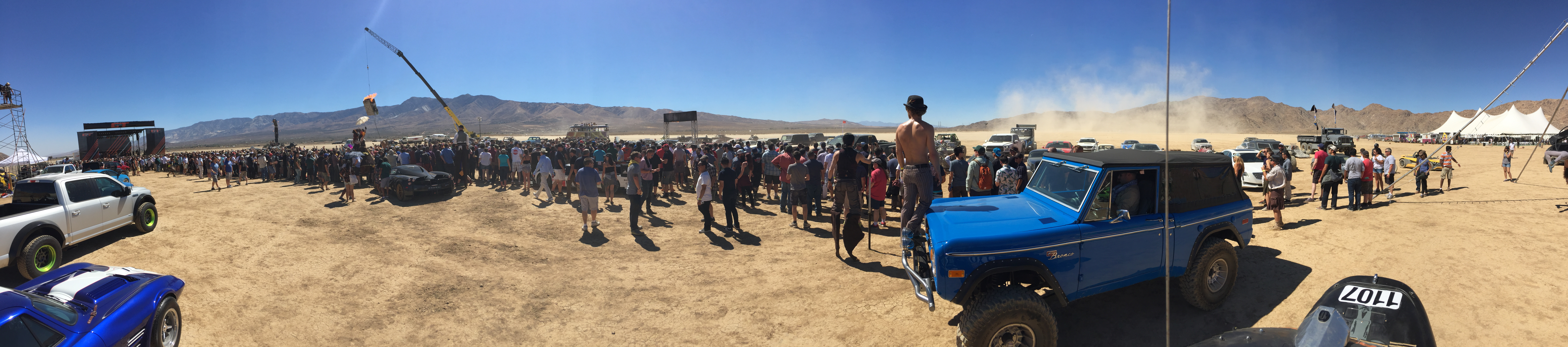
A panoramic view of Hothouse Flowers playing for the opening sequence of "The Holy Trinity" episode in the Lucerne Valley, California

== Broadcast ==
The Grand Tour is released to viewers across more than 195 countries and territories. attracting favourable viewing figures since its premiere episode,

Australian free-to-air network Seven Network started broadcasting the first series of The Grand Tour in mid-October 2017. Series 2 and 3 have not been broadcast.

French channel RMC Découverte started broadcasting the first series with the Namibian special episodes on 29 November 2017 and L'Équipe (TV channel) broadcast episodes 1 and 13 on 15 January 2018.

At the start of 2018, high-speed Eurostar train services between Paris or Brussels and London began to feature The Grand Tour as part of the available on board entertainment package.

Since September 14, 2024, The Grand Tour airs in syndication on local stations across the United States.

== Other media ==
=== Video game ===
On 15 January 2019, Amazon Game Studios released a companion video game for PlayStation 4 and Xbox One, to coincide with the third series of the programme, entitled The Grand Tour Game. Designed as an episodic, casual racing game, players take on a series of challenges based upon those from the series and using the same cars involved - for each new episode of the series, an episode of the game is simultaneously released with approximately 15 new challenges for the player to undertake. The game includes single player mode alongside local split-screen multiplayer for several of the challenges, with footage from the programme included in each episode's release. The presenters Clarkson, May, and Hammond provided voice-overs for the game. Since the game's release it has been met with mixed reviews from critics and positive reviews from fans of the show.

=== The Not Very Grand Tour and The Grand-ish Tour ===
In March 2025, a series of retrospective specials was announced, which revisit moments from The Grand Tour. The first special was released under the show name The Not Very Grand Tour and was titled The Glory and The Power. It premiered on 18 April 2025, with Hammond and May providing commentary.

The remaining three specials were released weekly in May 2026 (May 1, 8 and 15) under the show name The Grand-ish Tour, with episode titles A Trip Down Memory Lane, A Bit Further Down Memory Lane, and Completely Lost Down Memory Lane, respectively. The specials feature the trio on a set resembling a retirement home, a reference to Hammond's joke in the final special.

=== Reboot ===
In May 2025, The Sun newspaper reported that YouTubers James Engelsman and Thomas Holland, and social media personality Francis Bourgeois were the show's new presenting line-up. The new line-up was officially confirmed on 5 February 2026 in a video by Clarkson. Amazon formally announced the reboot on 14 July with the six-episode series released on 4 September, listed as its own show on Prime Video.

== See also ==
- List of Amazon Prime Video original programming
- DriveTribe, an automotive enthusiast website by Clarkson, Hammond and May.
