= 5-11 =

5-11 can refer to:

- May 11 (month-day date notation)
- 5 November (day-month date notation)
- 5th Battalion 11th Marines
- 5.11, an American apparel brand
