= Mat Best =

American internet personality, and entrepreneur

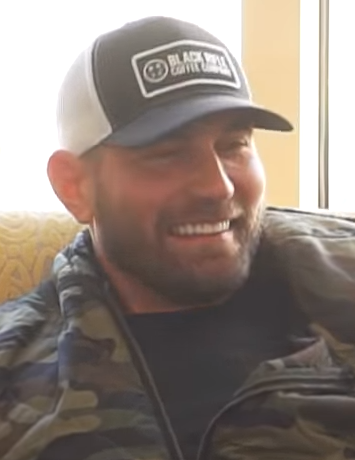
- Best in 2020
- Born: Mathew Alfred Best c. 1987 (age 38–39)
- Occupations: Internet personality Entrepreneur; Actor; Soldier (formerly)
- Years active: 2012–present
- Military career
- Allegiance: United States
- Branch: United States Army
- Service years: 2004–2008
- Rank: Sergeant
- Units: 2nd Ranger Battalion; 75th Ranger Regiment
- Conflicts: Iraq War; War in Afghanistan

Mathew Alfred Best is an American internet personality, entrepreneur, and a former United States Army Ranger. Best joined the United States Army shortly after graduating high school, eventually serving five deployments with the 2nd Ranger Battalion, before working as a private contractor for the Central Intelligence Agency. He operates a popular comedy-centric YouTube channel, has starred in a self-made movie, and published a best-selling book, a memoir of his military service written with two other authors. Best is also a co-founder of Black Rifle Coffee Company.

== Early life ==
Best enlisted in the U.S. Army in 2004 at 17, three months after graduating high school. His father is a U.S. Marine who served in the Vietnam War, while both of his brothers served in the U.S. Marine Corps during the Iraq War.

He served five tours with the 2nd Ranger Battalion, four in the Iraq War, and one in Afghanistan. After leaving the military he worked as a contractor for the Central Intelligence Agency.

== Career ==
He operates a popular satirical channel on the online video platform YouTube, where he produces content aimed at an audience of military service members, veterans, and the firearms community. Best began making videos in El Paso with then United States Air Force member Jarred Taylor, when Best would return during breaks from contracting tours overseas.

The channel has also released a number of music videos, including "Bitch I Operate", which peaked on the Billboard charts at 36.

=== Article 15 Clothing ===
In 2016, Article 15 partnered with another clothing company, Ranger Up, to produce a crowd-funded movie entitled Range 15. The film starred Best along with an ensemble of other veterans, including three Medal of Honor recipients, as well as Marcus Luttrell, best known as author of Lone Survivor, adapted into a film by the same name. The film won Best Film at the GI Film Festival. In the US military, Article 15 is a Non-judicial punishment.

=== Black Rifle Coffee Company ===
After a successful test roasting coffee under Article 15 Clothing with "Freedom Roast," Best formed Black Rifle Coffee Company in 2014, alongside Evan Hafer, Jarred Taylor and Richard Ryan. They promoted the company with provocative videos posted to YouTube, that Best described to CBS News as "way over the top". The company gained notoriety for the following two 2017 incidents: an endorsement from Donald Trump Jr., and again when the company pledged to hire 10,000 veterans after coffee chain Starbucks pledged to hire 10,000 refugees in the wake of travel restrictions enacted by US president Donald Trump.

== Thank You for My Service ==
In 2019 Best published Thank You for My Service, co-authored with Ross Patterson and Nils Parker. Written as a memoir, the book recounts Best's service in Afghanistan and Iraq.

Thank You for My Service reached number one for non-fiction on the Wall Street Journal and the Publishers Weekly best seller lists, and debuted at number five in non-fiction on The New York Times Best Seller list.
