= Black Rifle Coffee Company =

U.S. coffee company (founded 2014)

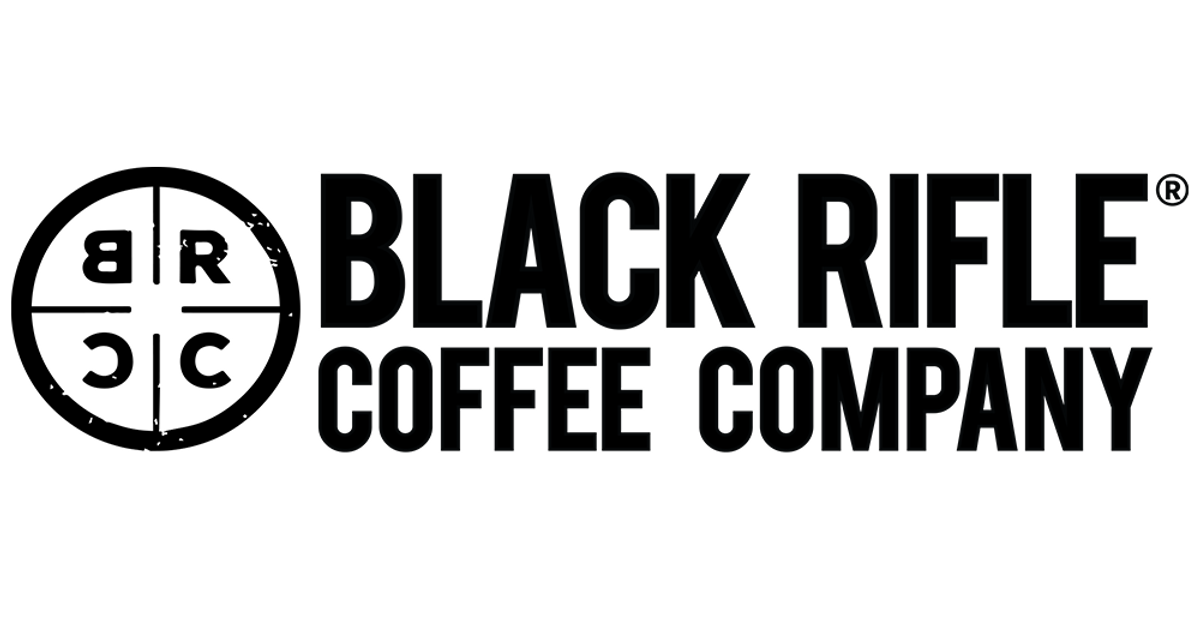
- Type: Public
- Traded as: NYSE: BRCC
- Industry: Retail
- Founded: 2014; 12 years ago
- Headquarters: West Valley City, Utah, United States
- Key people: Evan Hafer, Mat Best, Tom Davin, Richard Ryan, Jarred Taylor, Andy Stumpf, Dennis Adams, Chris Mondzelewski
- Products: Coffee, clothing, mugs
- Website: www.blackriflecoffee.com

Black Rifle Coffee Company (BRCC) is a coffee company based in West Valley City, Utah, United States. Founded in 2014 by former U.S. Army Green Beret Evan Hafer, it gained national attention in 2017 after pledging to hire 10,000 veterans in response to Starbucks's pledge to hire 10,000 refugees. Their SEC filings at the end of 2025 show they have just under 500 total employees with about 150 being veterans or military spouses.

== History ==
The company was founded in December 2014 by former Green Beret Evan Hafer. He began by selling a small volume of his "Freedom Roast" coffee through a friend's apparel website. The coffee sold well, so Hafer launched his own brand and website through which to sell his coffee and branded accessories. The company specializes in its online, direct-to-consumer coffee subscription service, which had over 100,000 subscribers as of 2020. In addition to online sales, Black Rifle Coffee Company has physical coffee shops in Utah, Texas, Florida, Oklahoma, Georgia, Montana, Virginia, and Tennessee. The coffee is also distributed at some firing ranges, 5.11 Tactical stores, and Bass Pro Shops.

In 2017, BRCC expanded into Canada with a division based in Alberta and led by CEO Darren Weeks.

In 2018, BRCC opened a new coffee roasting facility in Manchester, Tennessee, as part of a $6 million investment in the state. It also launched Coffee or Die Magazine, an online news and lifestyle publication that reports on military, veteran, law enforcement, and coffee topics. In 2018, the company's gross revenue totaled $30 million. In 2019, BRCC employed more than 200 people—40 percent of them veterans of the U.S. military. At the time of reporting, their products were available at 1,700 retail locations across the country. On September 29, 2019, BRCC opened its first stand-alone licensed coffee shop in Boerne, Texas. According to the Washington Examiner, circa 2021 they employed approximately 550 people, half of whom were veterans, military spouses or reservists.

The company expanded in 2020 with the release of ready-to-drink canned iced coffee. In March 2020, BRCC launched a coffee-donation campaign to support medical and emergency workers, quarantined military personnel and their families, and others working to mitigate the national and global impact of the COVID-19 pandemic. In May, a Canadian gun ban enacted following the 2020 Nova Scotia attacks was mistakenly thought to include a ban on the coffee company, but further inspection revealed that the ban was actually applied to a similarly named Arizona-based "BlackRifle Company".

A July 2021 article in The New York Times, Hafer describes his vision for growth of the physical franchised stores using retired military non-commissioned officers (NCOs). He sees Navy petty officers and Army staff sergeants joining the company and running a franchise of their own rather than joining the local police force in their hometowns.

=== SPAC ===
In November 2021, Black Rifle Coffee Company merged with SilverBox Engaged Merger Corporation via a special-purpose acquisition company in an effort to raise funds for expansion and to go public. The company had a valuation of approximately $1.7 billion at the time of the merger. The merger completed in February 2022.

== Politics ==
Black Rifle Coffee Company's corporate image is built on its conservative politics and support for veterans. In 2018, over half of its staff were former military.

The company maintains a pro-military, pro-gun, pro-police image and has publicly supported the politics of US President Donald Trump through actions such as publishing a since-deleted blog post that supported Trump's then-current proposal of an immigration ban from Muslim-majority countries. Its political stance has attracted attention from Fox News, and the company has been endorsed by conservative broadcast personality Sean Hannity and Donald Trump Jr.

A 2021 Salon.com article reported that BRCC is trying to draw a line and distance itself from "the far-right" after BRCC logos and gear appeared on Kyle Rittenhouse, a teen who was acquitted due to a finding of self defense after killing two people and injuring another during a Black Lives Matter protest in Kenosha, Wisconsin. Black Rifle Coffee's symbols were also present on people who stormed the United States Capitol on January 6, 2021.

== Marketing ==
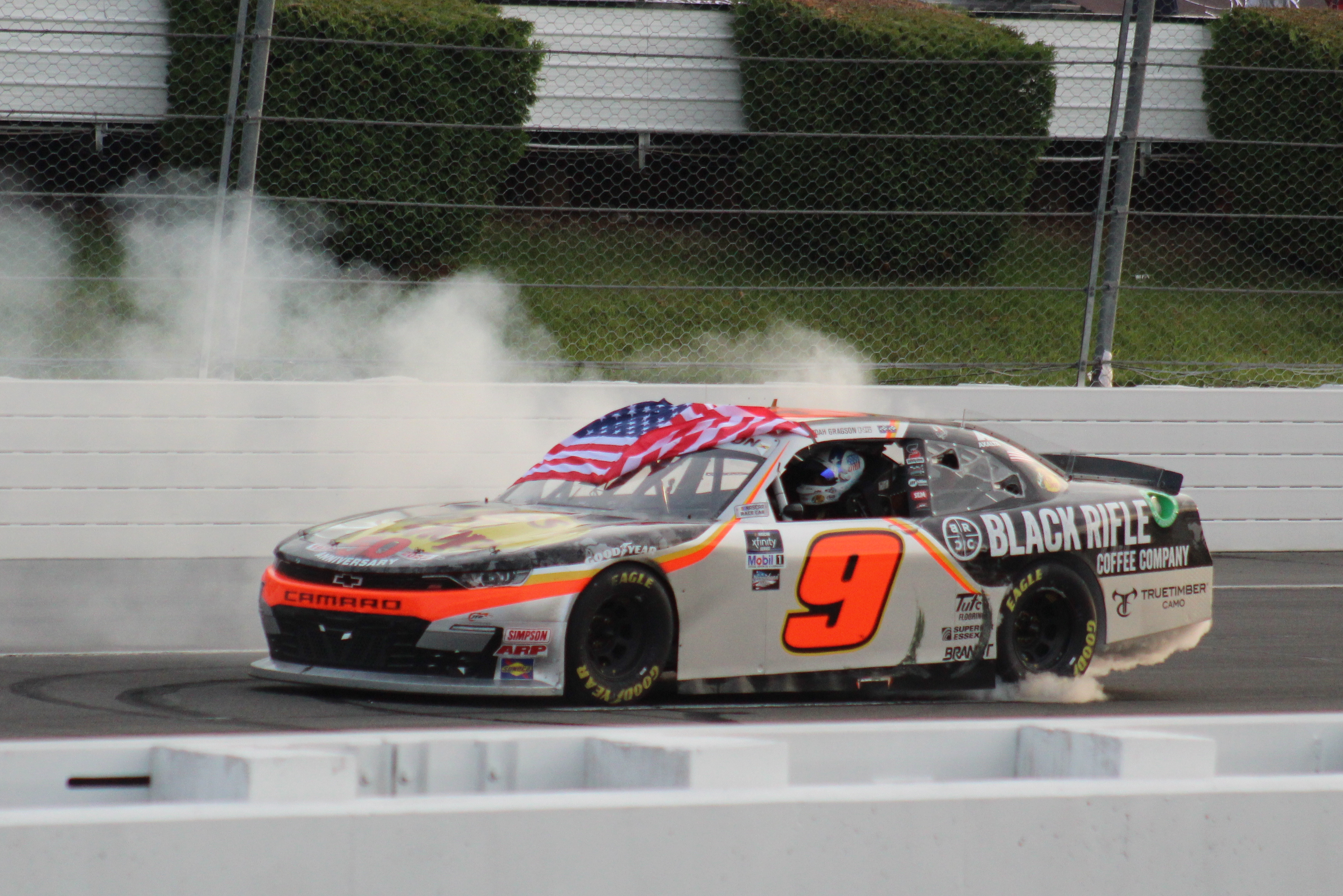
Noah Gragson's NASCAR Xfinity Series car with Black Rifle sponsorship in 2022

The company's brand is tied closely to its pro-gun and socially conservative image as well as close links with American military and law enforcement.

In 2017, BRCC launched an advertising campaign based on their plan to hire 10,000 veterans. While it was conceived previously, BRCC launched the campaign after coffee retailer Starbucks Corporation launched an advertising campaign centered around their plan to hire 10,000 refugees. BRCC released a meme on social media that juxtaposed an image of ISIS fighters photoshopped with Starbucks cups next to an image of American soldiers in combat, which read: "Starbucks vows to hire 10,000 refugees," and "Black Rifle Coffee Company vows to hire 10,000 veterans." Company posts associated with the ad campaign labelled Starbucks "Hipsterbucks." While Hafer criticized what he saw as a publicity stunt by Starbucks, BRCC also received similar criticism around their ad campaign, especially because of the size disparity between BRCC and Starbucks as well as the suggestion in BRCC's ad campaign that Starbucks doesn't hire veterans. In 2013, Starbucks CEO Howard Schultz and former Secretary of Defense Robert Gates had launched a similar program to hire 10,000 veterans in the next five years and by 2017 had hired 8,000 of them. As of February 2017, BRCC employed 52 people in total, 75% of whom are veterans. Hafer responded that BRCC and Starbucks are very different companies, and that their size disparity meant that BRCC's proposal was a much more ambitious plan. In a 2017 interview with Vice News, founder Hafer commended Starbucks' veteran hiring program and clarified that he supports all hiring pushes as long as the message is a positive one.

For a campaign in July 2019, BRCC donated a bag of coffee to a police officer for every bag purchased, in response to a story that six Tempe, Arizona police officers had been asked to leave a branch of Starbucks.

BRCC rejected a potential logo for one of their coffee bags featuring a Renaissance-style rendering of Saint Michael the Archangel, a patron saint of military personnel, shooting a short-barreled rifle. The design was rejected when Hafer was informed by a friend at the Pentagon that the image of Saint Michael standing on the neck of Satan was being used by white supremacists because of the resemblance to George Floyd's murder.

The company sponsors NASCAR drivers Ty Dillon, Noah Gragson, Chase Briscoe, and Matt Crafton. In the American Rally Association, BRCC-sponsored drivers like Travis Pastrana and Dave Carapetyan compete under the Black Rifle Coffee Motor Sports Team name. Pastrana, whose family is closely tied to the military, also has a personal endorsement deal with BRCC that began in 2022 after ending his partnership with longtime sponsor Red Bull; the two parties first collaborated for a rally car helicopter jump stunt in 2018.

In July 2022, the Dallas Cowboys were criticized for announcing a new partnership with BRCC a day after the Highland Park parade shooting on Independence Day. Black Rifle subsequently released a statement explaining the news was "timed to coincide with the Independence Day holiday" and that the partnership had been discussed long before the date.

== See also ==
- List of coffee companies
