= FDR: American Badass! =

- Film poster
- Directed by: Garrett Brawith
- Written by: Ross Patterson
- Starring: Barry Bostwick; Lin Shaye; Bruce McGill
- Edited by: Adam Beamer
- Music by: Peter Bateman; Shay Raviv
- Production companies: A Common Thread; Street Justice Films
- Distributed by: Screen Media Films
- Release dates: March 30, 2012 (Phoenix); September 24, 2012
- Running time: 93 minutes
- Country: United States
- Language: English

FDR: American Badass! is a 2012 American comedy film spoofing the life and presidency of Franklin Delano Roosevelt. In this version of his life, FDR's polio is caused by werewolves. Werewolves are also behind the Axis powers, and it is up to President Roosevelt to stop them and their plans for world domination. The film stars Barry Bostwick, Lin Shaye, and Bruce McGill.

The film premiered at the 2012 Phoenix Film Festival.

== Cast ==
- Barry Bostwick as Franklin Delano Roosevelt
- Lin Shaye as Eleanor Roosevelt
- Bruce McGill as Louis
- Kevin Sorbo as Abraham Lincoln
- Ray Wise as Douglas MacArthur / Dougie Mac
- Ross Patterson as Cleavon Buford
- Richard Riehle as Senator Bronson
- Paul Ben-Victor as Mussolini
- Paul Willson as Winston Churchill
- Keri Lynn Pratt as Marietta Buford
- Deon Richmond as George
- William Mapother as Dr. Ellington
- Ahmed Best as Curtis

== See also ==
- Abraham Lincoln: Vampire Hunter
