= Shay Raviv =

Israeli musical artist

Yishay Raviv ישאי רביב
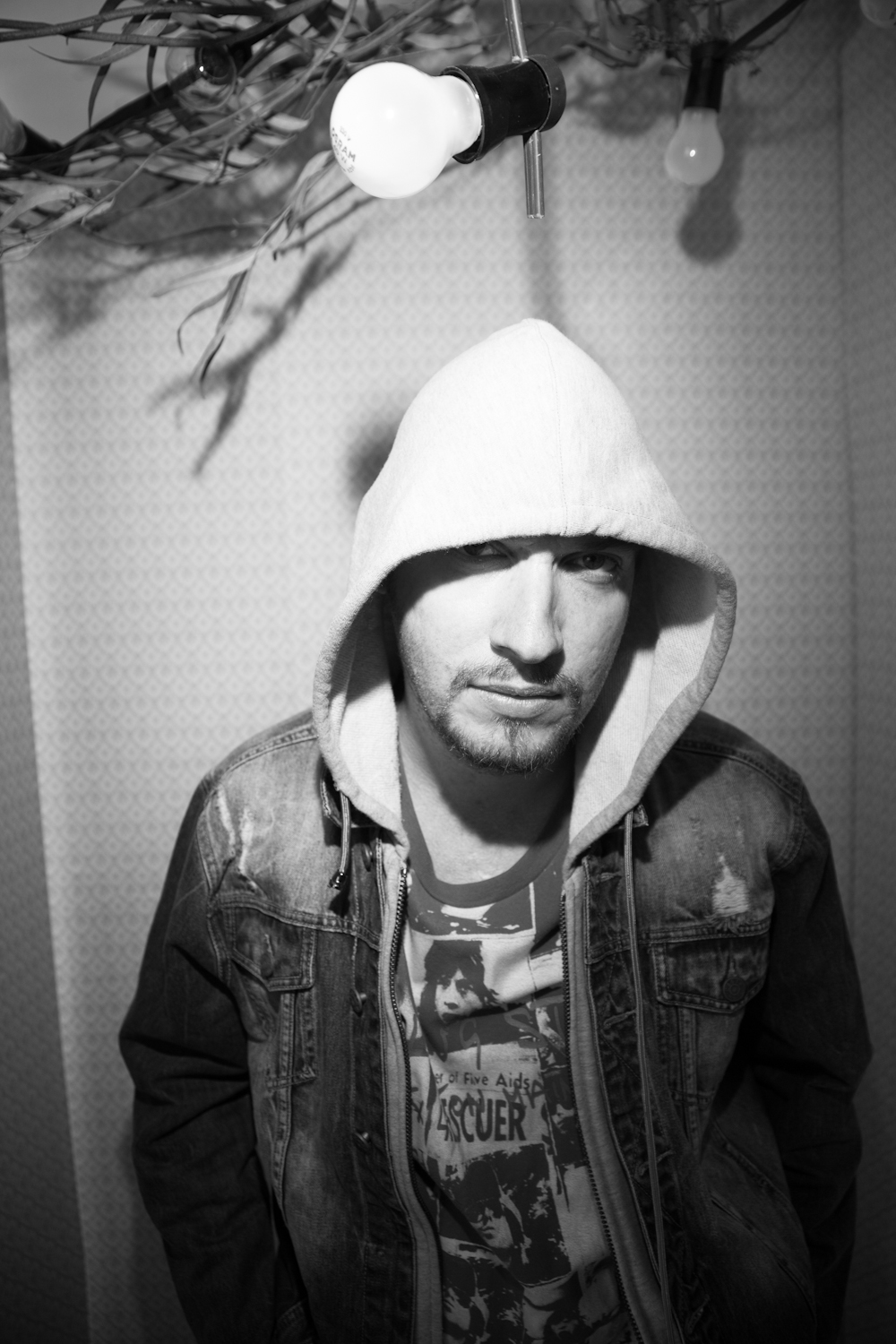

Background information
- Born: Yishay Rabinowicz; May 10, 1982 (age 44)
- Genres: electronic
- Occupations: songwriter, record producer, composer
- Instruments: Vocals, guitar, piano, synthesizer, keyboards
- Website: www.vvmusic.biz

Yishay Raviv (Hebrew: ישאי רביב) is a Tel-Aviv based record producer and songwriter.

== History ==
Yishay Raviv is an Israeli-born songwriter, producer, and pioneering force in the world of electronic music. After shaping the Israeli electronic music scene, he moved to Los Angeles, where he expanded his creative horizons and delved deeper into diverse musical genres. Yishay’s work has been in TV shows like House of Lies (Showtime) and Eastwick (ABC), as well as in films such as The Chicago 8.

Known for his remixes, Yishay has remained at the forefront of electronic music culture, collaborating with high-profile artists like Infected Mushroom and Jonathan Davis. His recent projects include collaborations with Miranda Lee Richards (known for her work with The Brian Jonestown Massacre and The Jesus and Mary Chain) and new material with the electro-pop group Terry Poison.

== Discography (partial) ==
This discography includes Shay Raviv's songwriting, composition, performance, production, music supervision, and remixes.

=== Remixes ===
Year	Artist	Song(s)	Label	Also On
2013	Infected Mushroom	Wanted To (Violet Vision Remix)	White Label	
2013	Incubus	Stellar (Violet Vision Remix)		
2008	Jonathan Davis and the SFA	Got Money (Violet Vision Remix)	The Firm Music	
2005	Infected Mushroom	Cities of The Future (Violet Vision Remix)	BNE Records, Resist Music UK	Assault and Battery (System Recordings, 2005)

=== Commercial Music ===
2015	Britney Spears: The Elvira Collection

=== Film & TV Music ===
Year	Title
2016	CBS Sports Spectacular
2016	Dateline Saturday Nigh Mystery (NBC)
2016	E! E news Live
2016	Id Kill For You (Season 2 & 3)
2016	Meredith Viereia Show
2014	$50 and A Call Girl: A Love Story
2013	Chicago 8
2012	Poolboy Drowning Out The Fury
2012	FDR: American Badass!
2012	House Of Lies
2011	Darnell Dawkins: Mouth Guitar Legend
2010	Eastwick

=== Music Supervision ===
Year	Title
2016	Range 15
2014	$50K and A Call Girl: A Love Story
2013	Chicago 8
2012	Poolboy Drowning Out The Fury
2012	FDR: American Badass!
2011	Darnell Dawkins: Mouth Guitar Legend
