= Mercedes-Benz X-Class =

Pickup truck

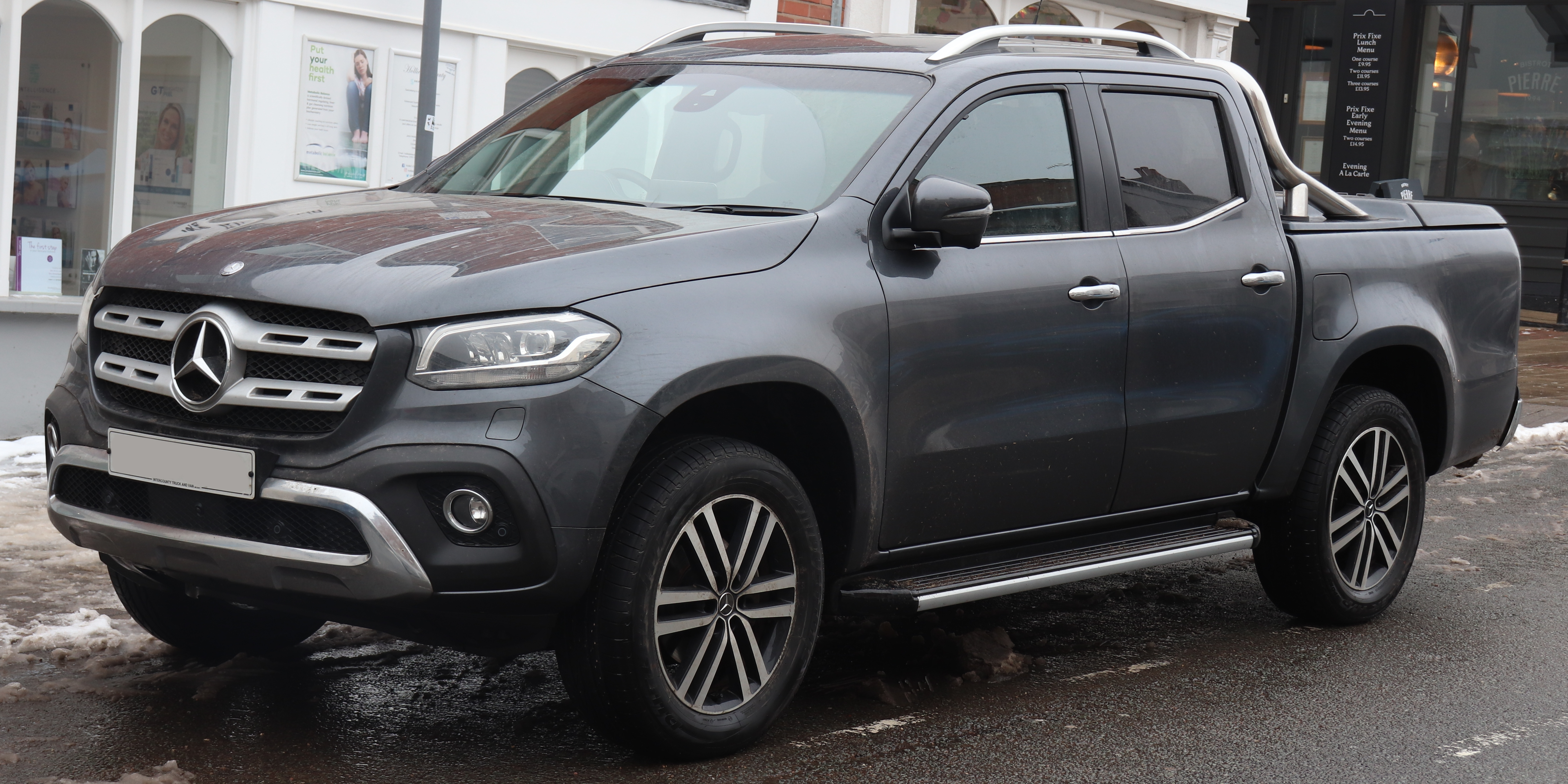

Overview
- Manufacturer: Daimler AG; Nissan
- Model code: W470
- Production: November 2017 – May 2020
- Assembly: Spain: Barcelona (Nissan Motor Ibérica)
- Designer: Wini Camacho

Body and chassis
- Class: Mid-size pickup truck
- Layout: Front-engine, rear-wheel-drive; Front-engine, four-wheel-drive
- Platform: Nissan F-Alpha platform
- Related: Nissan Navara; Renault Alaskan

Powertrain
- Engine: Diesel: 2.3 L OM699 I4 turbo (X220d); 2.3 L OM699 I4 twin-turbo (X250d); 3.0 L OM642 V6 turbo; (X350d)
- Transmission: 6-speed manual (X220d and X250d); 7-speed automatic (X250d and X350d)

Dimensions
- Wheelbase: 3,150 mm (124.0 in)
- Length: 5,340 mm (210.2 in)
- Width: 1,920 mm (75.6 in)
- Height: 1,819 mm (71.6 in)

Chronology
- Predecessor: Mercedes-Benz Musso Sports

The Mercedes-Benz X-Class (W470) is a mid-size pickup truck sold by the German automaker Mercedes-Benz from 2017 to 2020. It was based on the D23 Nissan Navara, it featured Mercedes-specific features and technologies. It was unveiled at a world premiere in Cape Town, South Africa, in July 2017, and first went on sale later that year. After slow sales and public perception that the X-Class was an expensive rebadge of a Navara, Mercedes-Benz discontinued it in 2020.

== Development ==
In 2015, Mercedes-Benz announced that development of a pickup truck was in the works. The new vehicle, developed in conjunction with the Renault-Nissan-Mitsubishi Alliance, was to be assembled at Nissan and Renault plants in Europe and South America.

On 25 October 2016, Mercedes-Benz announced a concept class called the X-Class Concept. Dieter Zetsche, Daimler Chairman and head of Mercedes-Benz cars, said it would help a growing segment. It was slated to be only available in Australia, New Zealand, Europe, Latin America, and Africa. The top-of-the-range engine was the turbocharged diesel V6 paired with a 4Matic permanent all-wheel drive system.

Production started in 2017 at the Nissan factory in Spain. Plans to produce the pickup at the Renault plant in Santa Isabel, Argentina were cancelled due to alleged contractual disputes between executives from both marques.

== Overview ==
According to Mercedes, the X-Class was the world's first true "premium" pick-up truck, although it followed the discontinued Lincoln Blackwood and Lincoln Mark LT, along with the also-discontinued Cadillac Escalade EXT.

Global sales of the X-Class in 2018, its first full year on the market, were just 16,700 in Europe, New Zealand, Australia, South America, and South Africa. It further decreased to around 15,300 in 2019, with 2,186 sold in Australia alone. Production of the X-Class was halted in May 2020 due to slow sales. The slow sales are primarily attributed to a negative perception of the vehicle's platform. It was argued that many customers expected an entirely new vehicle designed and built by Mercedes and were disappointed when it was instead presented as a joint-venture with Nissan/Renault. This issue was further compounded with the use of Nissan/Renault engines in lower end trim levels. Despite the X350 sharing the same V6 diesel engine platform as the G-Class and other Mercedes models, public perception was that the X-Class was an expensive rebrand of a Nissan Navara, an image it struggled to shake throughout its short production run.

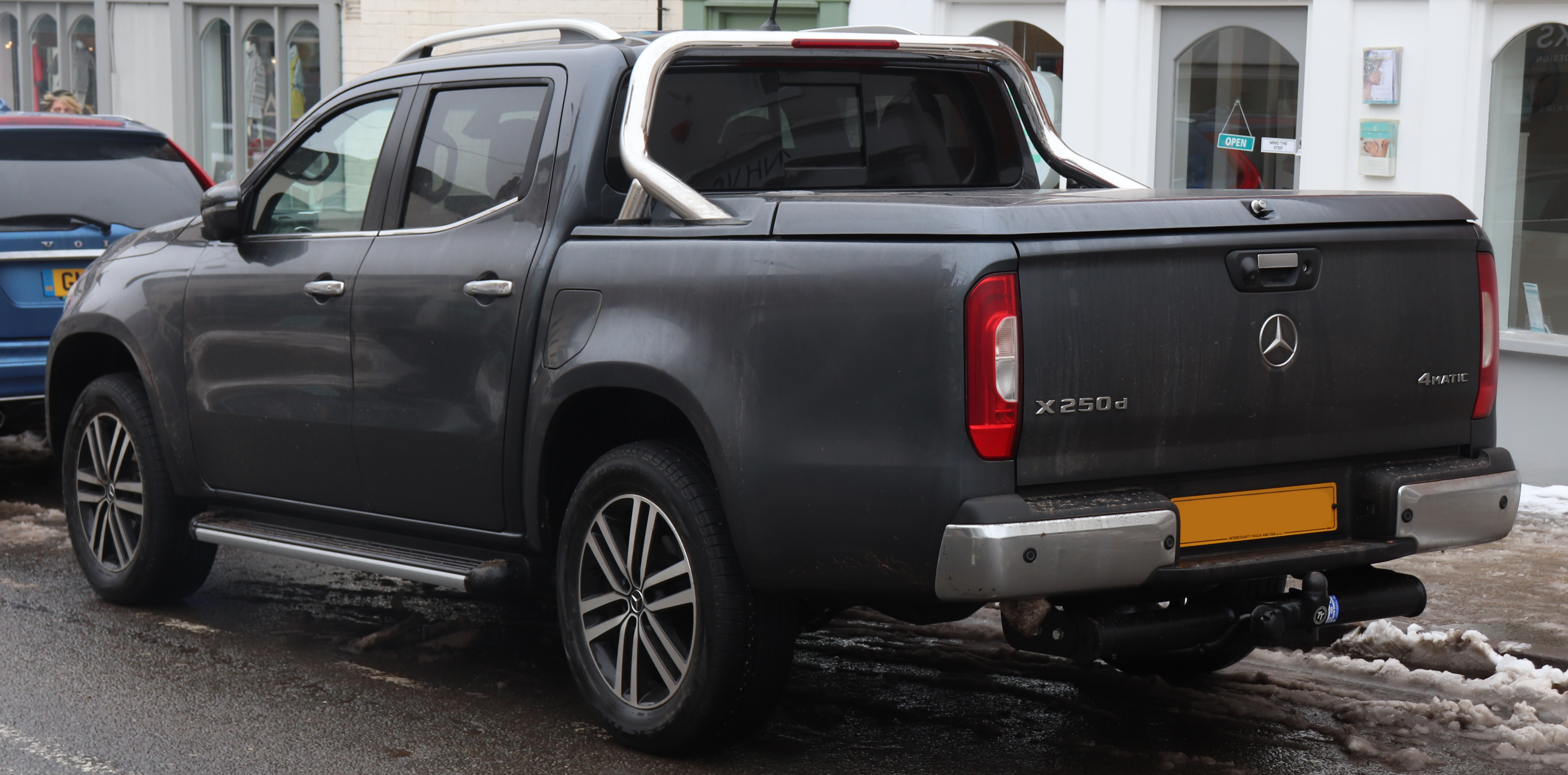
Rear View

== Models ==
The X-class launched with three trim levels: Pure, Progressive and Power.

== Safety ==
Euro NCAP test results Mercedes-Benz X-Class (2017)
| Test | Points | % |
|---|---|---|
| Overall: | 5 /5 stars | |
| Adult occupant: | 34.4 | 90% |
| Child occupant: | 43.0 | 87% |
| Pedestrian: | 34.0 | 80% |
| Safety assist: | 9.3 | 77% |

ANCAP test results Mercedes-Benz X-Class (2017, aligned with Euro NCAP)
| Test | Points | % |
|---|---|---|
| Overall: | 5 /5 stars | |
| Adult occupant: | 34.4 | 99% |
| Child occupant: | 43 | 87% |
| Pedestrian: | 33.9 | 80% |
| Safety assist: | 8.7 | 72% |

== Powertrains ==
Diesel engines
| Model | Years | Type/code | Power at rpm, Torque at rpm | Transmissions |
|---|---|---|---|---|
| X220d | 2017–2020 | 2,298 cc (140.2 cu in) I4 turbo OM699 DE23 LA R | 120 kW (163 PS; 161 hp) at 3,750; 403 N⋅m (297 lbf⋅ft) at 1,500–2,500 | 6-speed manual |
| X250d | 2017–2020 | 2,298 cc (140.2 cu in) I4 turbo OM699 DE23 LA | 140 kW (190 PS; 188 hp) at 3,750; 450 N⋅m (332 lbf⋅ft) at 1,500–2,500 | 6-speed manual 7-speed automatic |
| X350d | 2018–2020 | 2,998 cc (182.9 cu in) V6 turbo Diesel OM642 | 190 kW (258 PS; 255 hp) at 3,600; 550 N⋅m (406 lbf⋅ft) at 1,600 | 7-speed automatic |

== Promotion ==
On 19 July 2017, the promotional video/advertising spot "Mercedes-Benz X-Class: Pickup Meets Lifestyle – Trailer" was released, with "We Are Young" song by Blues Saraceno as soundtrack.
