= The Holy Trinity (The Grand Tour) =

Coordinates: 34.4580°N 117.0234°W

- The Grand Tour episode
- Clarkson, Hammond, and May take the stage for the first time in the series' airing.
- Episode no.: Series 1 Episode 1
- Directed by: Phil Churchward; Brian Klein; Kit Lynch-Robinson
- Presented by: Jeremy Clarkson; Richard Hammond; James May
- Original release date: 17 November 2016
- Running time: 71 minutes

Guest appearances
- Jérôme d'Ambrosio – during film; Chris Goodwin – during film; Hothouse Flowers – performed in intro; Celebrity Brain Crash appearances: Armie Hammer; Jeremy Renner; Carol Vorderman

Episode chronology
← Previous —	Next → "Operation Desert Stumble"

"The Holy Trinity" is the first episode of British motoring series The Grand Tour. It was made available exclusively through the Amazon Video streaming service, first on 17 November 2016. Jeremy Clarkson, Richard Hammond, and James May, who previously presented as a trio on BBC Two motoring programme Top Gear, present the show.

Prior to filming, Clarkson's contract was not renewed by the BBC after he was involved in an altercation with a Top Gear producer in March 2015, leaving Hammond, May, and Wilman to follow him in departing the show following the end of the series. Later in 2015, they signed a deal with Amazon to create an original series. Filming for the introduction and tent scenes took place in Los Angeles, California in September 2016. The episode features the trio introducing the new bits of the show, as well as their film. For the film, the trio traveled in three supercars to the Algarve International Circuit in Portugal, where they had timed laps performed by race car driver Jérôme d'Ambrosio.

The episode received very positive reviews from critics upon its release. Critics noted similarities between the episode and Top Gear in their reviews. It attracted nearly two million viewers in its first weekend of release and was eventually made available to non-Amazon Prime members for free viewing from 23 to 26 December 2016.

== Summary ==
Clarkson, Hammond and May launch their new series with a film showing Clarkson leaving London to fly to Los Angeles where he meets Hammond and May (both of whom, along with Andy Wilman, left Top Gear to stick with Clarkson). Irish rock band Hothouse Flowers plays "I Can See Clearly Now" as the trio drive modified Ford Mustangs (Clarkson in blue, Hammond in red, and May in white) through the California desert to Rabbit Dry Lake, while being accompanied by a range of cars and a fly-over by the Breitling Jet Team. The trio greet the audience and viewers and also introduce the show's tent.

The film presented in the episode shows Clarkson, Hammond and May testing three hybrid hypercars; the McLaren P1, Porsche 918 and LaFerrari at the Algarve International Circuit in Portugal. After the first portion of the film, Clarkson, back at the tent, introduces the "Conversation Street" segment, where the trio talk about a speeding ticket that May received for driving a mere 37 miles per hour (60 km/h) (which to the trio is ironic as they had long nicknamed May as 'Captain Slow'). Then the show's new test track, the "Eboladrome" at RAF Wroughton, is revealed, where after a Ferrari 488 is driven, Clarkson test drives a BMW M2, which is then taken around the "Eboladrome" by their new driver, former NASCAR champion Mike Skinner (billed as 'The American' as their new show's equivalent to The Stig). Afterward, the "Celebrity Brain Crash" segment is introduced, featuring celebrities who are scheduled to appear on the show, but are all humorously "killed" before being able to take part. Jeremy Renner, Armie Hammer and Carol Vorderman all appear individually during this segment.

Returning to Portugal, Belgian race car driver Jérôme d'Ambrosio performs timed laps in the hypercars. Clarkson makes a bet with Hammond and May that they will be able to demolish his house, if the McLaren P1 is not the fastest in a timed lap. The episode ends with the lap times being revealed back in the tent, showing that the P1 did not have the fastest lap. Clarkson's house would later be destroyed in "Opera, Arts and Donuts", the third episode of the first season.

== Filming and production ==
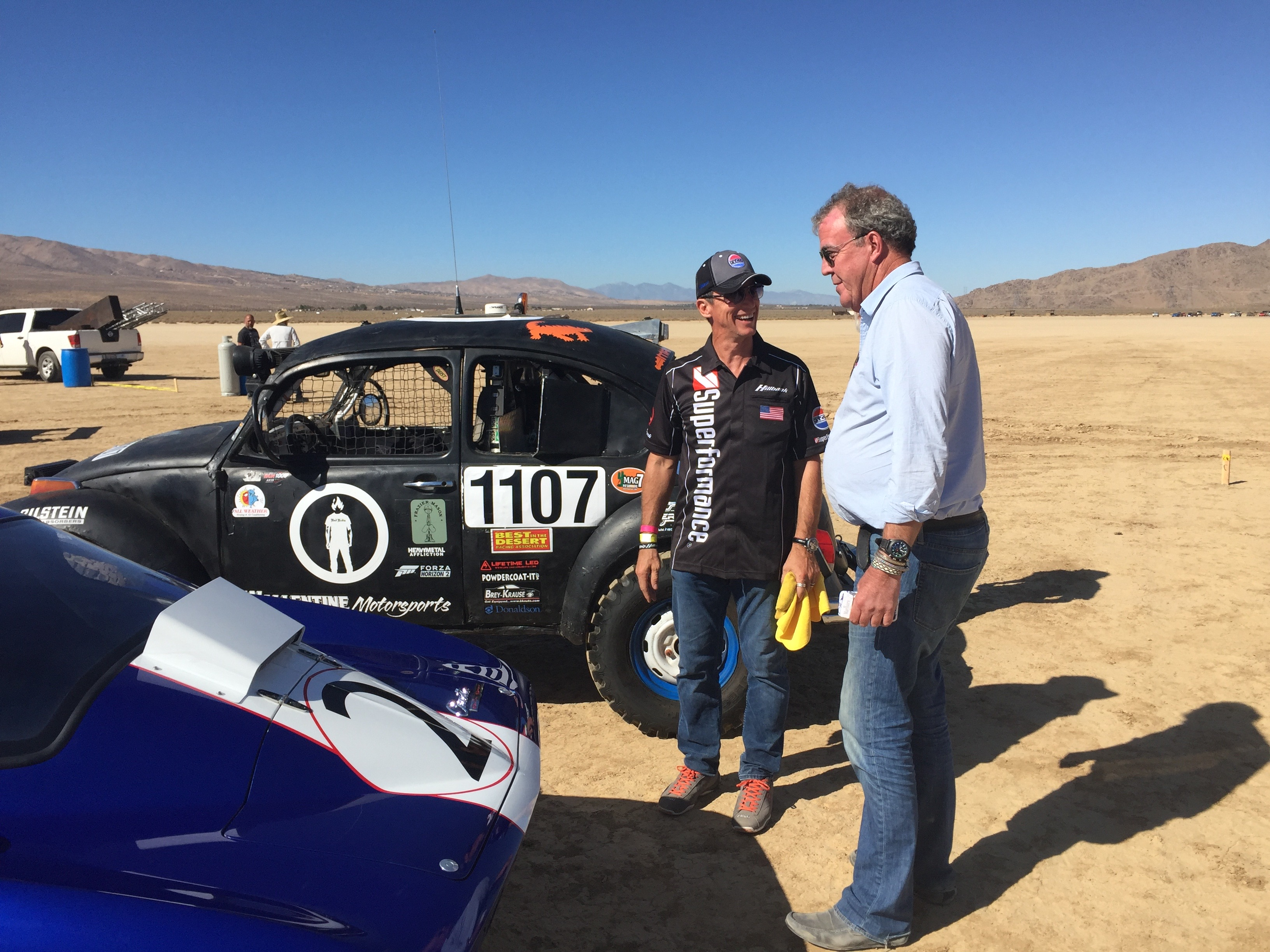
Jeremy Clarkson during filming for the opening sequence in Lucerne Valley, California

Prior to the filming of The Grand Tour, Clarkson, Hammond, and May presented BBC Two motoring programme Top Gear, with Wilman handling the executive production. In March 2015, it was reported that Clarkson had come under fire by the BBC for entering an altercation with Top Gear producer Oisin Tymon while filming for the show. The BBC chose not to renew Clarkson's contract after news of the altercation came to light. Hammond, May, and Wilman also left the programme afterward. Later in the year, the four signed a deal with Amazon to have an Amazon Video original series. Amazon CEO Jeff Bezos had described the deal as "very, very, very expensive" during an interview with The Daily Telegraph. After the deal was made, the four also created their own production company, named W. Chump and Sons.

"The Holy Trinity" marked Jeremy Clarkson's return to presenting since his departure from the BBC. Filming for the arrival in California and the studio recordings took place on 25 September 2016. Amazon had enabled a sweepstakes in July for customers to enter in order to get tickets for the tent recording of the episode. Though acting as the show's first episode to be aired, it was the second episode to have its studio recordings filmed; studio recordings for "Operation Desert Stumble", the second episode, were filmed in Johannesburg, South Africa earlier on 25 July. In October, it was revealed that the opening scene for the episode cost £2.5 million (equivalent to $3.2 million) to make, making it the most expensive scene made in television history. Production of the episode was handled by Clarkson, Hammond, May, and Wilman's independent production company W. Chump & Sons. Similar to Top Gear, Wilman served as the executive producer. The episode is presented, at maximum, in 4K Ultra HD, running at 23.98 frames per second with HDR.

== Release and reception ==
The Grand Tour is an Amazon Video original series and is exclusive to Amazon Prime members. It was scheduled for an 18 November 2016 release at 00:01 GMT, but was released an hour earlier on 17 November at 23:00 GMT instead. The opening weekend for the episode attracted about 1,954,000 viewers in the 18–49 age range, tripling that of The Man in the High Castle, another show on Amazon Video. Non-Prime members were able to watch the episode for free from 23 to 26 December.

"The Holy Trinity" received very positive reviews from critics upon its release. Comparisons were often drawn to Top Gear by critics. Luke Reilly of IGN awarded the episode a score of 8.0/10, stating that the show had gotten off to a "confident start" with the episode and that it "doesn't reinvent the Top Gear formula, but rather refines it." Neela Debnath of Daily Express complimented the episode's similarities with Top Gear, feeling as though it was "basically like Top Gear on steroids." Jack Shepherd of The Independent had a similar feeling about the episode, labeling it as "the best of Top Gear but with a much bigger budget" in his review headline. For The Guardian, Sam Wollaston wrote that the trio "leave the BBC in their dust" and that they are sure to please fans of Top Gear due to the similarities between the two.
