= Ranger Up =

American apparel company

Ranger Up is an American apparel company that is owned and operated by military veterans. Their T-shirt designs typically involve themes from the armed forces, mixed martial arts, and historical figures.

== History ==
The company was founded in 2006 by Nick Palmisciano, a former US Army infantry officer and Tim Kennedy an Army Special Forces veteran. While working on his MBA at Duke University, Palmisciano began making T-shirts for ROTC students and selling them to military personnel as a way to stay connected to the community. In 2014, the brand was among the top 1,000 internet vendors and has since utilized its success to run various programs for other veteran entrepreneurs.

According to its founders, one of the goals of Ranger Up is to empower and encourage other veterans to share their skills and talent with the private sector. They launched their line of Ranger Up Jeans in 2013 with the help of celebrity veterans like Brian Stann. The company had stopped selling jeans by 2017.

In 2014, the company started a "vetrepreneur" program that entailed hiring veterans for one year, and then backing their start-up venture for another six months.

In 2016, the company was worth $20 million.

== The Rhino Den ==
Ranger Up started a website called The Rhino Den as a place for the staff to share stories about their military experience. It has covered topics such as the United States federal government shutdown of 2013 and how it affected military families to United States military veteran suicides. As of July 2021, the website has been offline.

== Range 15 ==
In 2015, Ranger Up collaborated with another veteran-run apparel company, Article 15 Clothing (now out of business), to produce the feature-length indie film, Range 15. The movie cost $1.8 million to make, with $1.1 million raised via crowdfunding on Indiegogo. Range 15 premiered at the GI Film Festival in Washington, D.C., where it took the GI Choice Film Award. It later opened to the public at more than 350 theatres nationwide.

== Links ==
- Caron, Nick. "MMA Interview with Ranger Up Apparel CEO Nick Palmisciano, and T-shirt Giveaway!", Bleacher Report, 24 March 2011. Retrieved on 25 October 2013.
