= 5.11 =

American apparel brand

Coordinates: 37°42.1′N 121°0′W

- Type: Privately held company
- Industry: Clothing
- Founded: Modesto, California, U.S. (1992; 34 years ago)
- Founder: Dan Costa
- Headquarters: Costa Mesa, California
- Key people: Francisco Morales, CEO
- Products: Uniforms, tactical and professional apparel, outdoor and lifestyle clothing, footwear, backpacks, bags and accessories
- Revenue: ▲US$551.8 million (2025)
- Number of employees: 1,288 (2025)
- Parent: Compass Diversified Holdings
- Website: www.fiveeleven.com

5.11 (formerly 5.11 Tactical) is an American apparel brand of outdoor clothing, footwear, uniforms and tactical equipment, primarily targeting the market of military, law enforcement and public safety personnel. The company is based in Irvine, California, and operates a chain of retail stores with over 100 locations as of August 2023.

== History ==
5.11 started in Modesto, California, as a clothing line created by rock climber Royal Robbins. After reaching the top of a climb in Yosemite National Park, Robbins noticed the pants he was wearing weren't suited for climbing and decided he needed to design something more durable and functional. He and his wife, Liz Robbins, owned a boot and clothing company, Royal Robbins LLC, and began manufacturing specialty pants by the name of "5.11" in 1968, which had a trademarked strap-and-slash pocket design.

The name "5.11" comes from a high level of climbing technical grade difficulty used by the American Yosemite Decimal System, which Robbins helped develop in the 1950s. The difficulty level is somewhat jokingly defined as "after thorough inspection, you conclude this move is obviously impossible; however, occasionally someone actually accomplishes it".

Robbins sold a 51% stake in his company to Dan Costa in 1999, who, after much streamlining, noticed that 5.11 pants were becoming popular at the FBI Academy in Quantico, Virginia. Costa bought the entire company in 2002 and sold Royal Robbins Clothing back to Robbins in 2003, but kept the 5.11 brand and spun off a whole new company called 511 Inc. or 5.11 Tactical. Partnering with the FBI, Dan Costa and his co-partner, Francisco Morales, began creating additional tactical apparel and improving the existing product line.

In 2006, Inc. magazine ranked 5.11 #211 on its list of the 500 fastest-growing companies in the nation. In 2007, TA Associates, a Boston private equity firm, bought a majority stake in 5.11 for $305 million.

In 2012, 5.11 purchased Seattle-based custom outdoor apparel brand Beyond Clothing LLC, for an undisclosed amount. An April Fools' joke that same year resulted in the production of the Tactical Duty contemporary kilt. Also in 2012, the company announced it was moving development jobs to Irvine, California, while leaving some functions in Modesto.

In 2014, the company expanded into retail. It opened pilot locations in Riverside and Las Vegas, and over the next two years, it opened stores in California, Colorado, Texas, Florida, Utah and Australia.

In 2016, Compass Diversified Holdings acquired the company for US$401 million.

In 2022, 5.11 moved its headquarters from Irvine to Costa Mesa, California. At the time, 5.11 had 100 employees in Orange County.

=== Russo-Ukrainian war ===
In March 2022, Ukrainian President Volodymyr Zelenskyy wore a 5.11 shirt while addressing media.

Despite sanctions due to the Russo-Ukrainian war (2022–present), 5.11 is widely available in military stores in Russia. Video of Wagner group leader Yevgeny Prigozhin wearing a 5.11 plate carrier was shared before his death. According to customs data, The Insider found that tactical gear was being procured for Russian military personnel via firms in Latvia, Poland and Hong-Kong.

== Retail stores ==
As of August 2023, 5.11 operated a chain of over 100 retail stores across 34 states in the United States, as well as overseas branches in Australia, Bahrain, China, Germany, Indonesia, Ireland, Japan, Mexico, the Philippines, Portugal and Taiwan. Additionally, the flagship store was established in Finland in August 2020.

In 2023, they continued their plan to open new stores with multiple locations under development.

== In popular culture ==
Characters in films like John Wick, Deadpool and Rambo have worn 5.11.

Actress Jennifer Garner and her co-stars wore 5.11 watches in the 2007 film The Kingdom.

In the episode "The Truth Has a Ring to It" from season 2 of the HBO series Barry, Monroe Fuches (portrayed by Stephen Root) wears a 5.11 backpack.

Table of 5.11 products featured in various video games:

5.11 products featured in video games
Game title	Gear	Developer
Tom Clancy's Ghost Recon Wildlands	TacTec Plate Carrier, RUSH backpacks and Apex™ pants	Ubisoft
Far Cry 5	Sidewinder Flannel Shirt, Stryke™ Long Sleeve Shirt, H.R.T.® Titanium Watch, Station Grip Gloves, Sabre Jacket 2.0™, Cable Hiker Boot, Rapid Half Zip, Multicam® Flag Bearer Cap, All Hazards Nitro Backpack, Men’s Taclite® M-65 Jacket, Men’s Sierra Softshell	Ubisoft
Tom Clancy's The Division 2	Apex™ Pant, AMP24™, RUSH12™ Backpack, RUSH24™ Backpack, RUSH72™ Backpack, All Hazards Backpack, 5.11 All Hazards Nitro Backpack, 5.11 Stryke® Long Sleeve Shirt, 5.11 H.R.T.® Titanium Watch, 5.11 Speed 3.0 Boot, 5.11 Cable Hiker Boot, Flag Bearer Cap, 5.11 Flag Bearer Cap in MultiCam®, TacLite® Plate Carrier, 5.11 Station Grip Gloves, USA Patch, One X One Scope TPR Patch and BEAST Tactical Unit	Ubisoft
Tom Clancy's Ghost Recon Breakpoint	Apex Pant, RUSH 12, 24, 72 backpacks, AMP Bag, All Hazards Pack, Tac Tec Plate Carrier	Ubisoft
Escape From Tarkov	Tactical TacTec Plate Carrier, Tactical Hexgrid Plate Carrier	BattleState Games
Call of Duty: Warzone Mobile	Meridian Pant, TacTec® Plate Carrier, EVO 2.0 8" AR 670-1 Boot, 5.11® A/T 8" Non-Zip Boot, Flex-Tac® TDU® Ripstop Long Sleeve Shirt, Cold Weather Rapid Ops Shirt, Maverick Battle Belt, RUSH® 24 2.0 Backpack 37L, Field Watch 2.0, Station Grip 3.0 Glove, RAPID PL 1AA Flashlight, 5.11 Scope Cap, Flex Vertical GP Pouch, Flex Double Pistol Mag Cover Pouch, Flex Double AR Mag Pouch 2.0, Flex Single AR Mag Cover Pouch, Flex Flashlight Pouch, EXO.K Gel Knee Pads	Activision
