= List of foreign recipients of the Légion d'Honneur by decade =

The Legion of Honour (Note: The full official name is National Order of the Legion of Honour (French: Ordre national de la Légion d'honneur), formerly the Royal Order of the Legion of Honour (Ordre royal de la Légion d'honneur).) (French: Légion d'honneur) is the highest decoration in France and is divided into five degrees in ascending order: Chevalier (Knight), Officier (Officer), Commandeur (Commander), Grand Officier (Grand Officer) and Grand Croix (Grand Cross). (Note: The Grand Croix was issued as Grand Aigle (Grand Eagle) until 1814 and Grand Cordon until 1816.)

Membership in the Legion is restricted to French nationals. Foreign citizens who have served France or the ideals it upholds may, however, receive a distinction of the Legion, which is broadly equivalent to membership, and can be awarded at any of the ranks. Foreign nationals who live in France are submitted to the same requirements as French nationals.

A complete list of the members of the Legion from 1802, when the award was established, does not exist. The number of awards is estimated at one million. Approximately 3,000 of these were awarded at the most senior rank of Grand Cross (including 1,200 French nationals).

== List of some recipients ==
=== Before 1880 ===
- Prince Augustus Ferdinand of Prussia (1805), member of the Prussian royal family (Grand Aigle)
- Carel Hendrik Ver Huell (1806), Dutch (and later French) admiral who served in the Napoleonic Wars (Grand Aigle)
- Alessandro Volta (1806), Italian physicist and chemist who was a pioneer of electricity (Chevalier)
- Maximilian von Montgelas (1810), Bavarian statesman (Grand Aigle)
- Thomas Jones Barker, British artist; painter to Louis Philippe I.
- Patrick James Smyth, Irish revolutionary and politician. Smyth was made a Chevalier in recognition of his efforts organising an Irish ambulance service who serviced the French Army during the Franco-Prussian War of 1870.
- Louis von Blanc, Prussian naval officer who assisted with the recovery of the corvette Roland in 1867

=== 1880 to 1889 ===
- Joseph O'Kelly (1881), French-born Irish composer and pianist
- Sir Francis Dillon Bell KCMG CB MLC (1889), New Zealand politician and representative at the 1889 Paris World fair and exhibition
- The Honourable Thomas William Hislop (1889), New Zealand politician and representative at the 1889 Paris World fair and exhibition
- Sir Walter Lawry Buller KCMG (1889), New Zealand politician, naturalist and ornithologist who displayed at the 1889 Paris World fair and exhibition

=== 1900 to 1909 ===
- Abdessalem ben Mohamed Gaoied El Ferchichi El Aloui El Mohammedi (1877–1919) Leader & Caid of the Fraichiche tribe, Thala, Tunisia, Knight of the Order of Glory, Tunisia, 1901, Knight of the National Order of the Legion of Honor, France, 1907, Knight of the Order of Glory, Tunisia, 1910.
- Dr. Carlos Finlay (1908), Cuban physician and scientist
- Dr Richard Strauss (1907), German composer and conductor
- Navrotskiy Sergey Sergeevich(1862-1924) General, commander of the 3rd Battalion of the Life Guards Preobrazhensky Regiment, general for assignments at the Ministry of Internal Affairs. He was wounded during the assassination attempt on P.A.Stolypin on Aptekarsky Island. Order of St. Stanislaus, 3rd class; Order of St. Anna, 3rd class; Order of St. Stanislaus, 2rd class; Order of St. Vladimir, 3rd class; Order of St. Stanislaus, 1rd class; Order of St. Anna, 1st class; Order of the Montenegrin Prince Daniel I, 4th Class. He resigned after the February Revolution. He died in the custody of the Communist Revolutionaries.

=== 1910 to 1919 ===
- Annie Mistrick (née Brewer). Nurse who served in a French hospital and ambulance group in Europe throughout World War I, often near the front line. Also awarded the Croix de Guerre.
- Lieutenant Colonel William Joseph Robert Cheeseman (1917). Awarded for gallantry during World War I while serving in France in the 53rd Battalion, AIF. Also awarded the MC and DSO
- Lieutenant Colonel James Waddell (1915), New Zealand born officer in the French Foreign Legion during World War I (Chevalier 1915, Officier 1917. Commandeur 1920)
- Major General Robert Young CB CMG DSO (1916), New Zealand Army officer in recognition of services on Gallipoli
- Major Norman Frederick Hastings DSO (1916), New Zealand Army officer in recognition of services on Gallipoli
- Major General Sir George Spafford Richardson KBE (1916), New Zealand Army officer attached to the Royal Navy Division on Gallipoli
- Brigadier General Robert O'Hara Livesay CMG DSO (1917), British Army officer attached to the New Zealand Division on the Western Front during World War I
- Major General George Napier Johnston CB, CMG, DSO (1917), New Zealand Army officer and Commander New Zealand Division Artillery in France during World War I
- Major General Sir William Sinclair-Burgess KBE, CB, CMG, DSO (1917), a New Zealand Army Officer attached to the Australian Army Artillery in France during World War I
- Colonel, later Brigadier General Douglas MacArthur (1918, Commander) (US), Chief of Staff of the 42nd (Rainbow) Division and later the commander of the 84th Brigade of the 42nd Division. Awarded by Général d'Armée Henri Gouraud for his leadership and bravery in the Second Battle of the Marne. Upgraded to Grand Cross in 1946 for his performance in World War II.
- Lieutenant Colonel William Avery Bishop VC, DSO, MC, DFC (1918), (Canada), Air Marshal and highest scoring Canadian ace of the First World War; appointed Chevalier de la Légion d'Honneur
- Lieutenant Colonel Charles Hellier Davies Evans DSO (1919), Commander of the New Zealand Cyclist Corps on the Western Front during World War I
- Brigadier James Hargest CBE DSO (and two bars) MC ED MP (1919), New Zealand Army officer on the Western Front during World War I
- William B. Greeley (1919) for commanding U.S. Forestry troops in France during World War I; appointed Chevalier de la Légion d'Honneur
- Major Henry Whitehorn (1919), New Zealand Army officer who served in the Sinai during World War I
- Major General Sir Andrew Hamilton Russell KCB KCMG (1919), New Zealand Army officer and Commander of the New Zealand Division on the Western Front during World War I
- Colonel Robert Logan CB (1919), New Zealand Army officer and Administrator of Samoa during World War I in "recognition of valuable services"
- Edith Mary Pye Légion d'honneur (1919) for running maternity hospital in Châlons-sur-Marne for duration of WW I, OBE Officer of the British Empire – for services to Obstetrics & Gynecology as president of the Royal College of Obs & Gyny 1929–1949

=== 1920 to 1929 ===
- The Right Honourable William Fergusson Massey (1921), Prime Minister of New Zealand from 1912 to 1925, appointed Grand Officier in recognition of New Zealand's contribution during World War I
- Colonel the Honourable Sir James Allen GCMG KCB (1922) New Zealand Minister of Defence during World War I
- Colonel the Honourable Sir Robert Heaton Rhodes KCVO KBE VD (1920), New Zealand politician and special commissioner to the Red Cross during World War I
- Major General Alfred William Robin KCMG CB (1922), Commandant of New Zealand Military Forces during World War I
- Victor-Joseph-Adrien Boutilly (1925), Officer rank for service as Inspector, Head of the Technical Department for Water and Forests to the General Government of Algeria
- Karen Bramson (1927), a Danish author who lived in France and wrote plays and novels in French was appointed the Chevalier of the Légion d'honneur

=== 1930 to 1939 ===
- Henri O'Kelly (1931), Franco-Irish composer and church musician
- Reverend Hadden Kingston Vickery (1934), head of the Auckland Flying Angel Mission to Seaman and host of French Naval visits to Auckland
- The Honourable John Alexander (1934), President of the Auckland Branch of the Navy League and host of French Warship visits to Auckland
- George William Hutchison (1934), Mayor of Auckland City and host to French Naval visits to Auckland
- Bishop Francis William Mary Redwood (1934), Roman Catholic Archbishop of Wellington, Metropolitan of New Zealand
- Mary Ryan (1873–1961, academic) (15 July 1935), Professor of French at University College Cork, first woman professor on island of Ireland. Awarded the Légion d'honneur for services to the French language.
- Miss Jean Gardner Batten CBE OSC (1936), New Zealand aviator
- Mohamed Haniff (1937), a Tamil born in Pondicherry of French India was accorded the Chevalier de la Légion d'honneur. He was also the Deputy Mayor of Pondicherry during the French rule in India
- John Thomas Taylor (1937), American soldier during World War I (and later World War II) who was a lobbyist for the American Legion.
- Commander Charles Henry Tarr Palmer (1938), President of the Auckland Branch of the Navy League of New Zealand and host to French Warship visits
- Sir Ernest Hyam Davies (1938), Mayor of Auckland City and host to French Naval visits to Auckland
- Bishop James Michael Liston CMG (1938) Roman Catholic Bishop of Auckland during the centenary of the Catholic Church in New Zealand
- Sir Carrick Hey Robertson (1938), Chief Medical Officer of the Mater Misericordiae Hospital of Auckland during the centenary of the Catholic Church in New Zealand
- Doctor William Marshall MacDonald CBE (1939), President of the Wellington French Club (subsequently the Alliance Française)

=== 1940 to 1949 ===
- Marshal of the Soviet Union Rodion Malinovsky, a Soviet military commander in World War II and Defense Minister of the Soviet Union in the 1950s and 1960s (1945, Grand Officer)
- Field Marshal Sir Bernard Law Montgomery (1945, Grand Cross) (UK), Commander of the 21st Army Group.
- Air Marshal Sir Arthur "Mary" Coningham (1945) New Zealander serving in France during World War II
- Air Marshal Sir Charles Roderick Carr (1945), New Zealander serving in France during World War II
- Sir Archibald McIndoe (1946) pioneering New Zealand plastic surgeon who worked for the Royal Air Force rehabilitating badly burned aircrew during World War II
- General of the Army George C. Marshall (1945, Grand Cross) (US), U.S. Army Chief of Staff in World War II.
- General of the Army Douglas MacArthur (1946, Grand Cross) (US), Supreme Commander for the Allied Powers.
- General of the Army Dwight Eisenhower (1945, Grand Cross) (US), Supreme Allied Commander of the Allied Expeditionary Force in the European Theater.
- General of the Army Henry H. Arnold (1945, Grand Cross) (US), Commander of the U.S. Army Air Forces.
- Fleet Admiral Ernest King (1945, Grand Cross) (US), Chief of Naval Operations for the U.S. Navy.
- Fleet Admiral Chester Nimitz (1945, Grand Officer) (US), Commander-in-Chief of Pacific Ocean Areas.
- General Omar Bradley (1945, Grand Officer) (US), Commander of 12th Army Group.
- General George S. Patton (1945, Grand Officer) (US), Commander of U.S. Third Army.
- Wing Commander E.D.Skepper (1945, Officer) (UK), British liaison to General de Gaulle and the Free French
- John Nicholas Brown II (c. 1946, Officer) (US), Assisted in the identification and recovery of works of art stolen from France by Nazi Germany as one of the Monuments Men.
- General Ludvík Svoboda (1947, Grand Officer) (Czechoslovakia)
- General Omar Bradley (1948, Grand Cross) (US), U.S. Army Chief of Staff.
- Stanley Marcus (1949) (US), retailer of Neiman Marcus

=== 1950 to 1959 ===
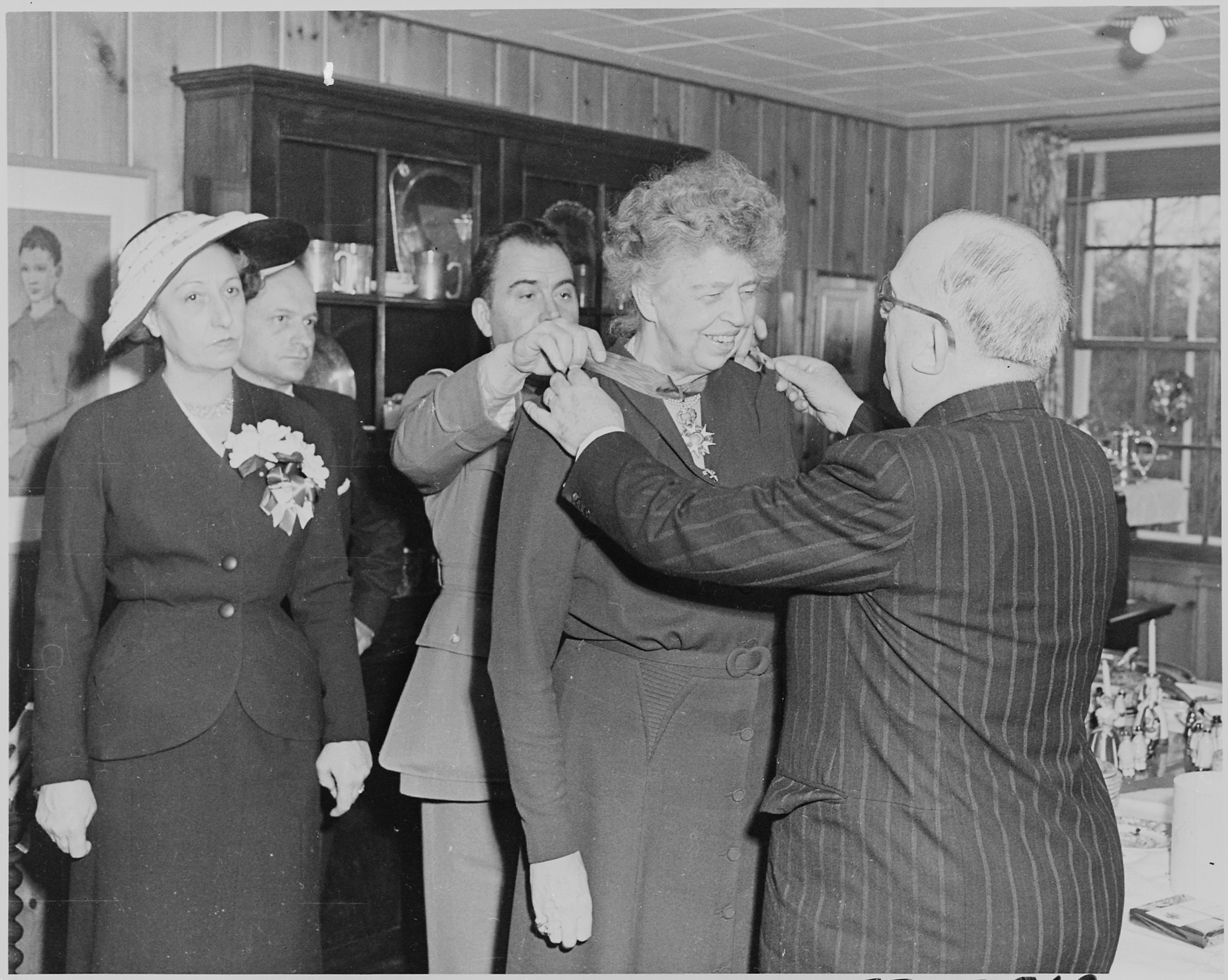
French President Vincent Auriol presenting Eleanor Roosevelt with the Legion of Honor during his visit to the Roosevelt estate at Hyde Park, New York (April 4, 1951)

- Jack B. Yeats (1950) (Ireland), artist, invested Chevalier de la Légion d'honneur
- Eleanor Roosevelt (1951, Commander), (US), Former First Lady of the United States.
- Jean Robertson McKenzie CBE (1956), New Zealand diplomat and first chargé d'affaires to the newly opened New Zealand diplomatic post in Paris
- Air Chief Marshal Sir Denis Hensley Fulton Barnett GCB CBE DFC (1958), for service as Commander of the Allied Air Task Force for Operation Musketeer during the 1956 Suez Crisis
- Shimon Peres (1957, Commander) for similar service during the same crisis
- Josip Broz Tito (1957, Grand Cross) for extraordinary contributions in the struggle for peace.
- General Alfred H. Noble, United States Marine Corps (1958), for service to the Allied Cause during two World Wars and for his sympathy to France and its people
- Otto Hahn (1959), Germany, chemist, discoverer of nuclear fission, Nobel prize winner 1944, first president of the Max Planck Society, appointed Officier by president Charles de Gaulle.
- Charles Tudor Leber (1959) Officier, General Secretary, Board of Foreign Missions, Presbyterian Church of The United States of America

=== 1960 to 1969 ===
- Víctor Manuel Villaseñor (1962), (México), politician and industrialist, received Commandeur 1962
- Varian Fry (1967), (United States), operated a refugee network from Marseille which helped over 2,000 people escape the Holocaust in 1940–41. Chevalier.
- Shinzo Hamai (1967), (Japan), for his promotion of world peace during and between his two terms as mayor of Hiroshima. Chevalier.

=== 1970 to 1979 ===
- May Arida (1978) (Lebanon), supporter of the arts and international exchange.
- David Marshall (1978) (Singapore), politician and diplomat, first chief minister of Singapore (1955–1956), first Singaporean ambassador to France (1978–1993)

=== 1980 to 1989 ===
- Orson Welles (1982, Commandeur) (US), actor, writer, director and producer
- Jannie Brombacher (1984), (the Netherlands), major in Royal Netherlands Army.
- Marechal Francisco da Costa Gomes (1984) (Portugal), Grã-Cruz da Ordre National de la Légion d'honneur.
- Raj Reddy (1984), (US), Carnegie Mellon professor and computer scientist
- Bette Davis (US), film actress.
- Rand Araskog (1987), (US), manufacturing executive
- Manuel Noriega (1987), (Panama), General commander of the Panamanian Defense Force
- Marion Wiesel (1987) (US), Holocaust survivor, translator, and philanthropist; Commandeur.

=== 1990 to 1999 ===
- Arturo Uslar Pietri (1990), (Venezuela), intellectual, lawyer, journalist, writer, television producer and politician. He won the Prince of Asturias Award (1990)
- Douglas Johnson (1990, 1997), (UK), British historian of France
- General Norman Schwarzkopf Jr. (1991, Grand Officer), (US), Commander of Operation Desert Storm.
- Garo Vanian (1993), (Sudan), awarded Chevalier as President Director General of Ararat International for grand merits
- Ivan Ceresnjes (1994), head of the Jewish community of Bosnia and Hercegovina, for non-sectarian humanitarian relief work during the Bosnian War.
- Jeremy Brett (1933-1995), (UK), Actor, for his performance as the definitive Sherlock Holmes, awarded at 1994
- Richard Jenrette (1996), (US) investment banker
- Ross Steele (1996), (Australia), author and academic, received the title of Chevalier
- Pete Goss (1997), (UK), MBE, yachtsman who rescued fellow competitor Raphaël Dinelli in the 1996 Vendée Globe sailing race
- Pamela Harriman (1997, Grand Cross), (US) United States Ambassador to France.
- Harry Patch (1998), (UK) Britain's last surviving First World War veteran. Appointed Officer in 2009
- Fairuz (1998), (Lebanon), singer, awarded the Légion d'honneur by President Jacques Chirac.
- Arthur James Jerram awarded the Lègion d'honneur at 103 years in 1998 for service in WW1 campaign – Egyptian & Egyptian EF & Western European.
- Frederick John Harris (1999) (UK), was awarded the Légion d'honneur at 102 years old for his service in the Royal Horse Artillery during the First World War.
- Odile Schweisguth (1999), French physician and pioneer of cancer center devoted to children.
- Frank MacDonald awarded the Lègion d'honneur at 102 years in 1998 for service in 40th Battalion WW1 campaign – The French ambassador to Australia Dominique Girard flew to Tasmania on November 19th, 1998, to personally present Frank with the Legion of Honour.

=== 2000 to 2009 ===
- Marion Wiesel (2000) (US), Holocaust survivor, translator, and philanthropist; Officier
- Ara Güler (2000), Turkish photojournalist, appointed Officier des Arts et des Lettres
- Toomas Hendrik Ilves (2001) (Estonia), President; Commandeur of the Légion d'honneur
- Quincy Jones (2001) (US), record producer and musician
- Beatrice Rangoni Machiavelli (2001) (Italy), Officier of the Légion d'honneur. Service to the European Union.
- Guadalupe Loaeza (2003) (Mexico), writer, received the title of Chevalier
- Henry Allingham (2003) (UK), world's oldest man and oldest British First World War veteran at the time of his death (appointed Chevalier in 2003 and promoted to Officier in 2009)
- Vahid Halilhodžić (2004), former Bosnian football player, now successful football manager, received his Légion d'honneur on 23 July 2004, during his tenure as manager of PSG
- Martin Scorsese (2005) (US), film director and advocate of film preservation
- Dominique Warluzel (2005), Swiss lawyer, playwright, and television producer
- George W. Lawn (2005) (US), Pharmacist's Mate 1st Class, US Navy, World War II. George was presented the Légion d'honneur on June 30, 2005, by Ambassador Jean David Levitte.
- Cedric Prakash (2006) (India) ("Chevalier de la Legion d'Honneur") Catholic priest, human rights activist, peace activist, and journalist
- Vladimir Putin (2006) (Russia), President of Russian Federation
- Sabah Al-Ahmad Al-Jaber Al-Sabah (2006) (Kuwait)
- Lt. Col. Herbert E. Carter (2006) (US), Tuskegee Airman, for his outstanding service during the liberation of France during World War II; presented by President Jacques Chirac
- Valentino Garavani (2006) (Italy), Italian fashion designer
- Lata Mangeshkar (2007) (India), singer
- HRH Galyani Vadhana (2007) (Thailand), was decorated with the Grand Officer
- Kent L Andersen (2007), chef, philanthropist feeding children in need
- Amitabh Bachchan (2007) (India), actor and Bollywood star
- Rogerio Walter Carreira (2007) (Portugal), President de Societe, was awarded the Chevalier of the Légion d'honneur by French President Jacques Chirac
- John Dunmore CMNZ (2007), New Zealand professor, author on French history in the Pacific and long-time president of the New Zealand Federation des Alliances Françaises
- Clint Eastwood (2007) (US), film actor and director
- Im Kwon-taek (2007) (South Korea), film director
- David Lynch (2007) (US), film director
- Festus Mogae (2008) (Botswana), the President
- Barbra Streisand (2007, Officier) (US) singer and actress.
- Marion Wiesel (2007) (US), Holocaust survivor, translator, and philanthropist; Commandeur.
- Íngrid Betancourt (2008) (Colombia), Colombian-French politician, released after six years of captivity under the Revolutionary Armed Forces of Colombia (FARC)
- Freddy Padilla de Leon (2008) (Colombia), Colombian Armed Forces Chief of Staff, Leading the Operation Jaque with success leaving in liberty Colombian-French politician Ingrid Betancourt
- Shimon Peres (2008) (Israel), the President
- Giorgio Armani (2008) (Italy), internationally renowned Italian fashion, furniture, and accessories designer
- Kutateladze Samson (2008) (Georgia), Brigade General Member of Parliament
- Miriam Were (2008) (Kenya), health advocate
- Randa Habib (2008) (Lebanon), Lebanese-French director of Agence France-Presse's office in Amman, Jordan
- Dame Ellen MacArthur (2008) (UK), sailor who previously held the record for the fastest solo circumnavigation of the globe in a yacht
- Charles Durning (2008) (US), actor, in recognition of his service with distinction during World War II in France
- Alain Frecon (2008) (US), honorary consul of France, Minnesota
- Steven Spielberg (2008) (US), film director, studio executive, and producer
- David Cronenberg (2009) (Canada), film director whose credits include Crash and The Fly; appointed Chevalier de l'Ordre des Arts et des Lettres
- Milva (Maria Ilva Biolcati) (2009) (Italy), Italian singer and actress, received the title of Chevalier of the Légion of Honour on 11 September 2009 for her contributions to French culture
- William G. Dabney (2009) (US), U.S. Army Corporal, 320th Barrage Balloon Battalion, the only all-black unit in the World War II D-Day landing
- Dame Carol Kidu (2009) (Papua New Guinea), received the title of Chevalier, for her efforts in promoting human rights. She was the first Papua New Guinean citizen to receive the award
- Veran Matić (2009) (Serbia), journalist and editor-in-chief of B92 "for the fight he has always led for independence and freedom of the media"
- Ružica Đinđić (2009) (Serbia), humanitarian, widow of Prime Minister of Serbia Zoran Đinđić "because of her active work at the foundation she heads"
- John Galliano (2009) (UK), Gibraltarian British couture designer, creative director of Christian Dior
- Ralph L. Bourgeois MD (2009) (US), Captain US Army 91st Medical Gas Treatment Battalion & Mobile Field Surgical Hospital, WW II D-Day at Utah Beach contributions to the liberation of the French Republic; and French language preservation via 'Council for Development of French in Louisiana' (CODOFIL)
- James T. Conway (2009) (US), General, United States Marine Corps Commandant
- William "Bill" Bruce Overstreet, Jr. (2009) (US), USAAF, WW II fighter pilot, with the 357th FG, 363rd FS. The "Yoxford Boys". Flew a P-51 "Mustang", named "Berlin Express". Only known Allied fighter pilot to turn in a kill while flying under the "Eiffel Tower" in Paris chasing a German Me-109. Chevalier medal, presented by Ambassador to the US Pierre Vimont at the D-Day Memorial 8 December 2009, Bedford, VA US. Vimont said of Bill Overstreet in his speech that the Legion of Honour is "The sign of my country's exceptional recognition of Captain Overstreet's heroic contribution to the liberation of France."
- Robert O. Paxton (2009) (US), Historian recognised for his expertise on the Vichy regime in France during World War II
- Steve Pisanos (2009) (US), Colonel, World War II fighter pilot who, after he was shot down, participated with the French Resistance
- Colonel Frederick C. Clinton, 2009, decorated World War II Army veteran recognized for his combat actions in the Colmar Pocket battles of January–February 1945 as a member of D Company, 254th Infantry Regiment attached to the 3rd Infantry Division.
- Francis Culotta (2009) (US), decorated Second Lieutenant Army veteran of World War II – Recognized for "Operation Dragoon", the invasion of southern France on Aug. 15, 1944, called the "forgotten D-Day." As Platoon Leader in Cannon Company, 143d Infantry Regiment, 36th Infantry Division, Mr. Culotta was wounded four times in France, but he and his unit pushed on through the Siegfried Line, a massive defensive wall on the German border.
- J. K. Rowling (2009) (UK), British author, writer of the Harry Potter series
- Peter Sloboda (2009) (US), Army veteran of World War II – for valour and bravery during the D-Day landings, Chevalier of the Legion of Honour 2009
- Settimeo Tiberio (2009) (US), decorated World War II veteran recognised for his valour during the D-Day invasion

=== 2010 to 2019 ===
- Ruth Simmons (2013), educator and administrator, first African-American president of an Ivy-League institution, "for a life dedicated to the power of intelligence and education to transform lives, to a career dedicated to being a visionary leader in academia." Chevalier in the French National Order of the Legion of Honor
- Lulwah Al-Qatami, educator and activist, first woman from Kuwait to attend university overseas, Nobel Peace Prize nominee, former Director of the Women's College of Kuwait University.
- Roy Alan McWilliams (born 1924) (2012) US WW II Battle of the Bulge for saving the lives of French villagers.
- Marie Chatardová (born 1963). Czech Ambassador to France (2010–2016). Commander.
- Orlow "Buzz" Freeman Garrett (2010), American graphic artist; U.S. Army, 3rd Infantry Division, I Company, 30th Regiment (WW II) Chevalier of the Légion d'honneur.
- Toni Morrison (2010), "the greatest American woman novelist of her time" -Mitterrand 2010
- Mehriban Aliyeva (2010), Azerbaijan's first lady
- Nigeria-Sunny A. Oluseyi Jegede (2010), past chairman of the Franco-Nigerian Chamber of Commerce & Industry,
- Vladimir Spivakov (2011) (Russia), violinist and conductor
- Joseph Brodsky (2011) (Russia/US), poet and essayist; won 1987 Nobel Prize in Literature
- Aleksey Venediktov (2011) (Russia), editor-in-chief of Echo of Moscow radio station
- Sergey Yastrzhembsky (2011) (Russia), diplomat and politician
- Emir Kusturica (2011), Serbian filmmaker
- Ambiga Sreenevasan (2011), "for her work in human rights advocacy"
- Iñaki Azkuna (2011) (Spain), Mayor of the city of Bilbao.
- Same Ekobo Albert (2011) (Cameroun), "Professor of Medecine. Malaria Specialist"
- Eddy Merckx (2011) (Belgium), most decorated professional cyclist of all time- Comandeur of the Légion d'honneur
- Aung San Suu Kyi (2012) (Myanmar), politician, Pro-democracy leader; won 1991 Nobel Peace Prize laureate. Awarded the honor by French Foreign Minister Alain Juppé on 16 January 2012
- Jacinto Convit (2011) (Venezuela), physician and scientist, known for developing a vaccine in an attempt to fight leprosy and his studies to cure different types of cancer. He was nominated for a Nobel Prize in Medicine for his experimental anti-leprosy vaccine.
- Nasrine Seraji (2011) (Iran / UK), Architect, Professor of Architecture, Dean of ENSA Paris-Malaquais from 2006 to 2016. Chevalier de l'Ordre National de la Légion d'honneur (14 July 2011)
- Carlos Cruz-Diez (2012) (Venezuela), kinetic and op artist. He lives in Paris. He has spent his professional career working and teaching between both Paris and Caracas. His work is represented in museums and public art sites internationally
- Georg Baselitz (2012), German artist. Chevalier of the Légion d'honneur.
- Monique F. Leroux (2012) Canadian business woman. Knight of the Legion of Honour.
- Vinton Cerf (2013), American computer scientist, for the invention of the Internet, Officer of the Légion d'honneur.
- Malvin E. Walker, American Army officer for his service in France in WW II.
- Nicholas Lamia, United States Navy for his service in France in WW II. He was in the first wave on Omaha Beach. Chevalier of the Légion d'honneur (13 February 2013)
- Jonathan Fenby, historian and journalist who wrote The General: Charles de Gaulle and the France He Saved
- Victor Erofeyev, Russian writer (3 October 2013)
- Gennady Timchenko, Russian-Finnish businessmen (12 October 2013)
- George Lizanich, American Army staff sergeant for his service in France in WW II
- Frances "Rusty" Rice, b. 1920, American, US Army Nurse in the Battle of the Bulge, Bastogne, France WW II, Chevalier presented 27 December 2014
- Johnie V. Arnold (2015), US Coast Guard, USS Bayfield (WW II), Normandy, Iwo Jima, Okinawa; Chevalier of the Légion d'honneur, presented in January 2015 at the Arkansas State Capitol by Sujiro Seam, the consul general of France in Houston
- Joseph Richard Burke, WO2 (ret'd), Canadian Army, WW II veteran, dispatch rider with the Toronto Scottish Regiment. Received award in the rank of Chevalier, 8 August 2015 at Royal Canadian Legion Grandona Branch 124 Iona, Nova Scotia
- Jeanne Gang (2015), American architect
- Tommy Gooch (2015), US Army, 90th Infantry Division (WW II), Normandy; Chevalier of the Légion d'honneur, presented in January 2015 at the Arkansas State Capitol by Sujiro Seam, the consul general of France in Houston
- Greggory Swarz (2015) (US) USAF Staff Sgt. of the 492nd Aircraft Maintenance Unit, for saving three French Airmen from a fiery crash by pulling them from the wreckage and using a tourniquet to save the third airman whose hand was lost in the crash during a NATO training exercise at Los Llanos Air Base, Spain, where he also earned the USAF Airman's Medal.
- Chris Norman (UK), Anthony Sadler, Alek Skarlatos and Spencer Stone (US) (2015), one Briton and three American travelers who subdued a gunman attacking the occupants of a Thalys train on its way from Amsterdam to Paris.
- Yang Ho Cho chairman, Hanjin Group (South Korea), Grand Officier of the Légion d'honneur, presented in November 2015
- Ronald Oxley (2015) (UK), b. 1923, former Petty Officer in the Royal Navy, for his role delivering ambulances to Omaha Beach on D-Day, in landing craft LCT 727.
- Cedrik Wasser, a British veteran, was awarded Chevalier de la Légion d'honneur in 2015 by President François Hollande for taking part in the Battle of Normandy and helping the liberation of France.
- Alan King, a British veteran, had been appointed to the rank of Chevalier in the Ordre National de la Légion d'Honneur in 2015 by President François Hollande in recognition of his involvement in the liberation of France during the Second World War.
- Robert Vincent Eley was appointed Chevalier in the Ordre national de la Légion d'honneur in November 2015 in recognition of his acknowledged military engagement and steadfast involvement in the Liberation of France during the Second World War.
- Robert M Gardner (awarded December 2015) for "Invaluable contribution to the liberation of France." Gardner landed on Gold beach during the Normandy Invasion as part of the 49th West Riding Infantry Division. (Polar Bear) and went on to Fontenay-Le-Pesnel where he was involved in a heavy battle with the 12th SS Panzer Division. During this battle he was badly wounded. During his recovery he was nursed by Q.A. Sister Mary, whom later became his wife, and was with him when he received his medal 71 years later. Died 27 December 2020 age 96
- Lance Corporal William Sutherland (born 1921, died 2015) (awarded December 2015) For his contribution to the liberation of France. Posted with the Seaforth Highlanders (51st Division, 2nd Battalion) he was part of the invading forces at Normandy and saw action in Italy and Africa. Sutherland died before he could be presented with his award.
- Frank Edward Whalley QPM (Queen's Police Medal), retired chief superintendent with Staffordshire Police and former commandant of Eynsham Hall Police Training Centre. A corporal in the Royal Irish Fusiliers during WW II, awarded the Légion d'honneur in 2015, aged 91, in recognition for his part in the D-Day Normandy Landings (Gold Beach).
- Derrick Dighton, a British veteran, was awarded Chevalier de la Légion d'honneur in 2016 for his efforts during the D-Day landings.
- Nasser D. Khalili, British-Iranian scholar, collector and philanthropist awarded Officier 11 April 2016 for his work in the pursuit of peace, education and culture among nations
- John Mierzejewski, Chevalier, (awarded May 2016), Private 1st Class (US Army), 29th infantry division, 16th infantry regiment, Heavy artillery gunner. Landed on Omaha Beach as part of the second wave of the invasion of Normandy.
- Lionel Barber, Chevalier de la Légion d'honneur, for European journalism
- Peter Chesney, Gunner, 109 Battery, 33 Field Regiment The Royal Artillery, Battle of Caen in the summer of 1944. Awarded Légion d'honneur at Hillingdon Hospital's Beaconsfield East Ward on Thursday, 3 November 2016, aged 92.
- James Edward Clarke (19/01/1925-13/04/2020), Chevalier de la Légion d'honneur, awarded 25 August 2016 for his part in the liberation of France on D-Day 6 June 1944, Royal Marine. Landing Craft. Juno Beach.
- Frederick Ernest Hart (11 November 2016), from Surrey, aged 92 years, Signalman in the Royal Navy
- Allan Norman (30 November 2016) from Sussex, aged 95 in recognition of his service during the liberation of France as a member of RAF Bomber Command Squadron
- Geoffrey William Penn, appointed Chevalier on 18 November 2016 in recognition of his service during the liberation of France as an officer in the Royal Signals during the Normandy Landings.
- Monica Bellucci (24 November 2016, Knight of the Legion of Honour), Italian actress and model, awarded by François Hollande.
- Yiannis Boutaris, Chevalier de la Légion d'honneur, Mayor of Thessaloniki, Greece. Awarded 5 December 2016
- Bill Gates and Melinda Gates in April 2017 for their charity effort.
- Max S. Eagelfeld (30 March 2018) 12th Armored Division, 82nd Armored Medical Battalion, for service during the liberation of Alsace during World War II.
- Gordon Victor Fells Powell, Royal Navy, was appointed Chevalier in the Ordre National de la Légion D'honneur in May 2017 in recognition of his WWII service during the liberation of France as a Naval Gunner during the Normandy D-Day Landings, and building of the Mulberry Docks.
- Leslie Eric Emmerson, British Army, 43rd Regiment, Bren Gunner, was appointed Chevalier in the Ordre National de la Légion D'honneur in May 2017 in recognition of his outstanding WWII service during the liberation of France both during the Normandy D-Day Landings, and throughout France.
- LeRoy M Wagner was appointed Chevalier in the Ordre national de la Légion d'honneur in August 2018, in recognition of his acknowledged military engagement and steadfast involvement in the Liberation of France during the Second World War. Wagner was a Tech Sergeant. 45th Infantry Division, 157th Infantry Regiment, Anti Tank, "The Thunderbirds". Wagner died in December 2017 and was awarded posthumously.
- Marcus "Stub" Bartusek (9 October 2018) US Army, 106th Infantry Division's 424th Regiment, Company H, 2nd Battalion with whom he participated, endured and survived the Battle of the Bulge and liberation of France in WW II.
- Nawab Ashiq Hussain Qureshi (October 2018) was appointed Chevalier in the Ordre National de la Légion D'honneur for ten years services as Honorary French Consul General in Lahore.
- Alvin Houston Perry (2019), 331st Infantry Regiment of the 83rd Infantry Division, prisoner of war (Stalag VII-A in Moosburg Germany), Purple Heart
- Russell M. "Russ", "Buddy" Robinson, Roanoke, VA USA (b. April 6, 1923) 2nd and 1st Lt US Army Air Forces WW II bomber pilot. Captain US Army National Guard 30th Division, North Carolina, helicopter pilot until 1964. In WW II Russell was a combat B-24 Liberator Bomber pilot of the ship "Arrowhead". He flew with the 453rd BG (Heavy), 732nd BS (31 missions); 93rd BG (Heavy), 329th BS (3 missions). French President Emmanuel Macron of France signed to have the Rank of Chevalier (Knight) of the Legion de Honour bestowed upon Mr. Robinson for missions of a humanitarian nature. Russell and crew flew some missions not carrying bombs, but food stuffs/medicine/blankets for the French refugees returning from Denmark/Holland/Belgium. Missions were as dangerous as carrying bombs, as there was still German fighters and anti aircraft fire. In his absence French President Emmanuel Macron sent the French Military Attache General, and his delegation from the French Consulate in Washington, DC, US to the annual Bernard Marie WW II Dinner to Honor WW II Veterans, Roanoke, VA US. June 5, 2019.
- Novruz Mammadov, Prime Minister of Azerbaijan (2019) for his contribution to the cooperation between Azerbaijan and France.

=== 2020 to present ===
- Alexander Crombie Cordiner (awarded 6 March 2020), b. 1924, British Army, 9th Battalion, Royal Tank Regiment, was presented with the rank of Chevalier in the Ordre national de la Légion d'honneur for his part in Operation Overlord during the Liberation of France during the Second World War.
- London (awarded Friday, 19 June 2020), in recognition of the role London and Londoners played in establishing Free France and Free French Forces during the Second World War.
- Fairuz (Monday, 31 August 2020), awarded the Légion d'honneur for the second time by President Emmanuel Macron.
- Egyptian President Abdel Fattah al-Sisi (December 2020), awarded Grand Cross of the Legion of Honour by President Emmanuel Macron, during a visit, parts of which the French media were barred from attending.
- Edmund F. Lewis (Monday, 7 February 2022) (US), was awarded the Légion d'honneur at 97 years old for his service in L Company of the 259th Regiment of the 65th Division of Patton's 3rd Army during the Second World War by President Emmanuel Macron.
- Martin E. Copenhafer (Friday, 1 April 2022) (US), was awarded the Légion d'honneur at 101 years old for his service in The United States Navy during the D-Day invasion of Normandy, France, on June 6, 1944, by President Emmanuel Macron.
- Robert O'Brien (Thursday, June 9, 2022) former National Security Advisor, for his role in helping to free two French hostages.
- Elissa Slotkin (awarded 30 March 2023) politician and national security official, awarded "in recognition of her role as Assistant Secretary of Defense for International Security Affairs under the Obama administration"
- Narendra Modi (awarded 23 June 2023), Prime Minister of India; awarded by President Emmanuel Macron on the occasion of Bastille Day military parade.
- Samuel Meyer (awarded 27 February 2024), b. 1924, awarded the Légion d'honneur by Ambassador Laurent Bili for his service in the 485 Fighter Squadron of the 370th Fighter Group of the United States Army Air Force during the Second World War.
- Harold "Hal" Friedman (awarded December 13, 2024), was awarded the Légion d'honneur on his 100th Birthday for his service in the United States Army during World War Two by the French Consul General. Hal was wounded during the Battle of the Bulge, and was one of the first Americans to liberate the Mauthausen Concentration Camp in Austria.
- Susan Blumenthal, MD, MPA (awarded April 28, 2025), Rear Admiral (ret); U.S. Asst. Surgeon General; First US Deputy Assistant Secretary for Women's Health; Ambassador, Institut Curie. Awarded Legion of Honor for her pioneering contributions in women’s health, global health, and the fight against cancer.
- Prabowo Subianto (awarded Thursday, 29 May 2025) President of Indonesia; awarded by President Emmanuel Macron during his visit to Indonesia's Military Academy.
- Samuel Williams (awarded Wednesday, 12 Nov 2025) Founder of Bird Foundation; awarded Legion of Honor for he contributed to promoting education for children, fighting discrimination, protecting women and children, and promoting gender equality.
- Keir Starmer (awarded 14 July 2026); Prime Minister of the United Kingdom (2024-2026); awarded Grand Officier de la Légion d'honneur.
