= List of Légion d'honneur recipients by name (D) =

The French government gives out the Legion of Honour awards, to both French and foreign nationals, based on a recipient's exemplary services rendered to France, or to the causes supported by France. This award is divided into five distinct categories (in ascending order), i.e. three ranks: Knight, Officer, Commander, and two titles: Grand Officer and Grand Cross. Knight is the most common and is awarded for either at least 20 years of public service or acts of military or civil bravery. The rest of the categories have a quota for the number of years of service in the category below before they can be awarded. The Officer rank requires a minimum of eight years as a Knight, and the Commander, the highest civilian category for a non-French citizen, requires a minimum of five years as an Officer. The Grand Officer and the Grand Cross are awarded only to French citizens, and each requires three years' service in their respective immediately lower rank. The awards are traditionally published and promoted on 14 July.

The following is a non-exhaustive list of recipients of the Legion of Honour awards, since the first ceremony in May 1803. 2,550 individuals can be awarded the insignia every year. The total number of awards is close to 1 million (estimated at 900,000 in 2021, including over 3,000 Grand Cross recipients), with some 92,000 recipients alive today. Only in 2008 was gender parity achieved amongst the yearly list of recipients, with the total number of women recipients since the award's establishment reaching 59 at the end of the second French empire and only 26,000 in 2021.

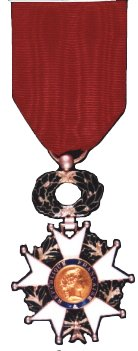

Recipient	Dates (birth – death)	General Work, and reason for the recognition	Award category (date)
Antoine Thomson d'Abbadie	1810 – 1897	French explorer, geographer, and astronomer	Knight (27 September 1850)
William G. Dabney	1924 – 2018	American soldier (African-American resident of Roanoke, Virginia). Recognised for his actions during the invasion of Normandy, as last known surviving soldier from the 320th Barrage Balloon Battalion. Awarded on the 65th anniversary of Normandy landings.	Knight (5 June 2009)
Leon Dabo	1865 – 1960	American painter. Recognised for his contributions to art.	Knight (1934)
Jan Henryk Dąbrowski	1755 – 1818	Polish general and statesman	Officer (1804); Grand Cross
Stefan Dąb-Biernacki	1890 – 1959	Polish general	Knight
Artin Dadyan Paşa	1830 – 1901	Ministre of Foreign affairs of Ottoman	TBA
Saro Dadyan		Turkish Ottoman historian	TBA
Louis-Jacques-Mandé Daguerre	1787 - 1851	Artist and inventor of the daguerreotype process of photography.	TBA
Edouard Daladier	1884 – 1970	Prime Minister of France. Recognised for his gallantry in action.	TBA (May 1917)
Salvador Dalí	1904 – 1989	Spanish surrealist artist	TBA
Ahmad Hasan Dani	1920 – 2009	Pakistani archaeologist, historian, and linguist.	TBA (1998)
Barney Danson	1921 – 2011	Canadian World War II veteran and Canadian politician (former Defence Minister).	TBA
Robert Darnton	1939 – Present	American cultural historian and academic librarian specializing in 18th-century France.	Knight (1999)
André Darrigade	1929 – Present	French professional road bicycle racer	Officer
Raymond Daudel	1920 – 2006	French chemist	Officier
Madeleine Hamm Dautartas	1923 – 2021	French Resistance member	TBA
Paul Davenport	1946 – Present	University of Alberta president (10th) and University of Western Ontario president (9th).	TBA
Walter J. Davey	1897 – 2001	British World War I veteran. Recognised for his service in France.	TBA
Athanase David	1882 – 1953	Canadian lawyer, politician, and businessman.	Knight (1923); Officer (1925); Commander (1934)
Michel David-Weill	1932 – Present	Investment banker and former Chairman of Lazard Frères.	Commander
Miles Davis	1926 – 1991	American trumpeter, bandleader, and composer.	Knight (1991)
Michael S. Davison	1917 – 2006	United States Army four-star general	TBA
Louis Nicolas Davout	1770 – 1823	Marshal of France	Grand Cross]
Marcel Déat	1894 – 1955	French politician	TBA
Francois Debat	1785 – 1861		TBA
Alma de Bretteville Spreckels	1881 – 1968	Wealthy socialite and philanthropist (San Francisco, California)	Grand Cross
André Debry	1898 – 2005	Last surviving French veterans of the World War I. Recognised for his war record and work as school principal	Officer
Claude Debussy	1862 – 1918	French composer	Knight (January 1903)
Clara Longworth de Chambrun	1873 – 1954	American patron of the arts and scholar of Shakespeare	Knight (1928)
George W. Deckard	1896 – 2001	American World War I veteran	TBA
Odile Decq	1955 – Present	Architect	Knight (2003)
Reza Deghati	1952 – Present	Iranian-French photojournalist	TBA
Kambiz Derambakhsh		Iranian cartoonist	Knight (26 October 2014)
Simone Del Duca	1912 – 2004	French businesswoman	Commander
Cino Del Duca	1899 – 1967	Italian-born businessman film producer and philanthropist	TBA
Percival Alfred Delafield	1897 – 1999	UK Royal Engineer.	TBA
Léon Delagrange	1873 – 1910	French aviator	Knight (1909)
Édouard Delamare-Deboutteville	1856 – 1901	Inventor, Engineer, and Industrialist	Officer (1896)
Paul-Louis Delance	1845 – 1924	French painter	Knight (1908)
Sonia Delaunay	1885 – 1979	French artist	Officer (1975)
Alain Delon	1935 – Present	French actor (1960s-1970s) and businessman.	Knight (21 February 1991); Officer (25 March 2005)
Eugène Deloncle	1890 – 1944	French fascist leader and former naval engineer. Recognised for his military service (World War I), including the Western Front. Known for becoming a prominent nazi-collaborator during World War II.	Knight (decree: 16 June 1920)
Ousmane Dembélé	1997 – Present	French professional football player (FC Barcelona / France national football team).	Knight (2018)
Jeanne Marie-Madeleine Demessieux	1921 – 1968	French composer and organist	Knight
Horst Demler	1979-Present	French Soldier	Knight
Mimi Denisi		Greek actress	TBA
Gérard Depardieu	1948 – Present	French actor	Knight (1996)
William E. DePuy	1919 – 1992	United States Army General	Commander
Georges Descrières	1930 – 2013	French actor	Officer (January 2004)
Adrien Charles Deshommets de Martainville	1783 – 1847	French politician	Knight (1821)
Catherine Destivelle	1960 – Present	French rock climber and mountaineer	TBA
Henri Deutsch de la Meurthe	1846 – 1919	French petroleum businessman (oil) and early aviation supporter	Commander (20 November 1912)
Gabriel Devéria	1844 – 1899	French diplomat and interpreter	Knight (1876); Officer (1896)
Louis DeWachter (known as Louis Dewis)	1872 – 1946	Belgian Post-Impressionist painter	Knight
Harry DeWolf	1903 – 2000	Canadian naval officer. Recognised for his services at sea in the war against the enemy.	Officer (3 September 1946)
Douglas Dickerson		World War II 82nd Airborne Division veteran	TBA
Joseph T. Dickman	1857 – 1927	United States Army officer (major general, service in five wars)	Commander (1919)
William Didier-Pouget	1864 – 1959	French artist	Knight (decree: 14 November 1900); Officer (decree: 13 July 1933)
Laure Diebold	1915 – 1965	Member of the French Resistance during World War II	TBA
Marlene Dietrich	1901 – 1992	American actress and Singer. Recognised for his wartime work.	Knight; Commander
Céline Dion	1968 – Present	Canadian singer	Knight (May 2008)
Jacques Diouf	1938 – 2019	Senegalese diplomat and United Nations' Food and Agriculture Organization (FAO) Director-General	Officer (1978); Commander (1998)
Walt Disney	1901 – 1966	American entrepreneur, animator, writer, voice actor, and film producer	Knight (1935)
Abdelkader El Djezairi	1808 – 1883	Algerian religious and military leader. Recognised for leading a struggle against the French colonial invasion in the mid-19th century.	Grand Cross
Do Cao Tri	1923 – 1971	General in the Army of the Republic of Vietnam (ARVN)	TBA
Douglas Dodds-Parker	1909 – 2006	British imperial administrator, wartime soldier, and Conservative politician.	TBA
Robert Doisneau	1912 – 1994	Photographer	TBA
Arnold Dolmetsch	1858 – 1940	French-born musician and instrument maker	Knight (1938)
Arielle Dombasle	1953 – Present	French actress, singer, producer	TBA
Phạm Văn Đồng (ARVN general)	1919 – 2008	General of the Armed Forces of the Republic of Vietnam	TBA
Kees van Dongen	1877 – 1968	Dutch-French painter. Known for being one of the leading Fauves.	Knight (decree: 13 January 1926); Officer (decree: 27 February 1954)
Francis Patrick Donovan	1922 − 2012	Australian academic, lawyer, and diplomat.	Knight (1998)
William J. Donovan	1883 – 1959	American World War I veteran	TBA
Gustave Doret	1866 – 1943	Swiss composer and conductor	TBA
Henri Lucien Doucet	1856 – 1895	French painter	TBA (1891)
Kirk Douglas	1916 – 2020	American actor, director, producer, screenwriter, and philanthropist. Recognised for his distinguished services to France in arts and letters.	TBA (1990)
Henry Doulton	1820 –1897	English businessman, inventor and manufacturer of pottery. Known for developing the firm of Royal Doulton.	Knight (1878)
Mahmoud Dowlatabadi	1940	Iranian writer and actor. Known for his promotion of social and artistic freedom in contemporary Iran.	TBA (2014)
Wayne A. Downing	1940 – 2007	United States Army general (four-stars)	TBA
Jacques Drabier		Pilot in the Free French Air Force during the Nazi Occupation	TBA
Normand Drapeau		U.S. WWII veteran	TBA
Alfred Dreyfus	1859 – 1935	French artillery officer	Knight (decree: 13 July 1906; ceremony: 21 July 1906); Officer (November 1918)
Marie-Odette Dubois-Violette	1918 - 2004	First female Inspector General of National Education in France	Knight (1977)
Louis Auguste Dubuisson			TBA
Marcel Louis Célestin Dubuisson			TBA
René Ducourtieux	1924 - 2013	French NCO Army (1944–1962)	TBA
Francis P. Duffy	1871 – 1932	Canadian American soldier, Catholic priest and military chaplain.	TBA
Margot Duhalde	1920 – 2018	Chilean pilot. Known for serving with the Air Transport Auxiliary of the Royal Air Force in World War II, as Chile's first female military pilot and first female air traffic controller.	Knight (1946); Commander (2007)
Alexandre Dumas, fils	1824 – 1895	French author and playwright. Known for the romantic novel "The Lady of the Camellias" (1848)	TBA
Dr. Allen B. Du Mont			TBA
François Joseph Dumont	1918 - 1997	Free French Air Force	TBA
Jules Dumont d'Urville	1790 – 1842	French explorer and naval officer. Recognised for the recovery of the Venus de Milo for France's Louvre. Note: Known for exploring the south and western Pacific, Australia, New Zealand, and Antarctica.	Knight
Marie-Julien Dunand	1841 – 1915	French priest and missionary, apostolic vicar of North-Western Szechwan	Knight (25 May 1898)
Richard Saunders Dundas	1802 – 1861	Royal Navy officer	Grand Officer (2 August 1856)
John Dunmore	1923 – Present	New Zealand historianacademic, historian, author, playwright, and publisher. Note: Only the tenth New Zealander to be award a Knight and the third New Zealander to be promoted to Officer.	Knight (1976); Officer (2007)
Anny Duperey	1947 – Present	French actress and best-selling author	Knight (1997)
Andrée Dupeyron	1902 - 1988	Civil and military aviator who broke distance records in the 1930s and flew for the Free French Air Force. She was a member of the Premier corps de pilotes militaires féminins.	1949.
Charles-Edmond Duponchel	1804 - 1864	Paris Opera Director and Businessman (Maison Duponchel silverware company founder). Recognised for his military service to France.	TBA
Andrée Dupont-Thiersault	1927 – Present	Former member of the French Resistance, Ravensbrück concentration camp survivor	Commander (2017)
Julien Dupré	1851 – 1910	French painter	TBA (1892)
Marcel Jean-Jules Dupré	1886 – 1971	French composer, organist, and pedagogue. Recognised for his service to the arts and music of France, organist of Saint-Sulpice from 1934 til his death, Director and former professor of the Conservatoire de Paris (1954-1956), member of the Académie des Beaux-Arts, winner of the Prix de Rome, 1914	Knight (27 August 1923) Officer (22 January 1935) Commander (30 August 1948)
Charles François Dupuis	1794 – 1868	French savant and professor of rhetoric at the Collège de Lisieux, Paris. Known for the Christ myth theory, that Christianity was an amalgamation of various ancient mythologies and that Jesus was a mythical character.	Knight
Maurice Gustave Duruflé	1902 – 1986	French composer, organist, and musicologist. Recognised for his services to the arts and music of France.	Knight (1954) Officer (1966)
Durga Charan Rakshit		South African anti-apartheid campaigner and Nelson Mandela confidante. Recognised for his lifelong service to the community.	Knight
Charles Durning	1923 – 2012	American actor	Knight (April 2008)
Gaëtan Duval	1930 – 1996	Mauritian Barrister, statesman and politician (Parti Mauricien Social Démocrate).	Commander (1973)
Bob Dylan	1941 – Present	American singer-songwriter, author and visual artist.	TBA (13 November 2013)

== See also ==
- Legion of Honour
- List of Legion of Honour recipients by name
- List of foreign recipients of Legion of Honour by name
- List of foreign recipients of the Legion of Honour by country
- List of British recipients of the Legion of Honour for the Crimean War
- Legion of Honour Museum
- Ribbons of the French military and civil awards
- War Cross (France)
