= Khaberni =

Jordanian online newspaper in Arabic

Khaberni خبرني
- Type: Daily
- Format: Online newspaper
- Editor-in-chief: Mohammad Hawamdeh
- Founded: 2008
- Language: Arabic
- Headquarters: Amman
- Website: Official Arabic website

Khaberni (in Arabic: خبرني) is a private news agency that publishes an online newspaper. The name of the agency in Arabic translates to "Tell me".

In a market study carried out by Ipsos in March 2012 it was established that Khaberni was among the top 20 most visited websites in the country along with two other news portals, namely Saraya and Ammon News.
