= The Penguin History of Modern China =

2008 book by Jonathan Fenby

The Penguin History of Modern China: The Fall and Rise of a Great Power, 1850 to the Present
- First edition cover
- Author: Jonathan Fenby
- Language: English
- Subject: History of China since 1850
- Genre: Popular history
- Publisher: Allen Lane
- Publication date: 2008
- Publication place: United Kingdom
- Media type: Print (hardback and paperback)
- Pages: 768 pages
- ISBN: 978-0-7139-9832-0
- OCLC: 212431401
- Dewey Decimal: 951.033
- LC Class: DS755 .F414 2008

The Penguin History of Modern China: The Fall and Rise of a Great Power, 1850 to the Present is a non-fiction book about the history of China by Jonathan Fenby. The popular history book was published in 2008 by Allen Lane. Split into six parts, the book covers the Qing dynasty's final decades; Sun Yat-sen's establishment of the Republic of China and the Warlord Era; the Second Sino-Japanese War and the Chinese Civil War; Mao Zedong's reign including the Great Leap Forward and the Cultural Revolution; Deng Xiaoping's reign including the policy of socialism with Chinese characteristics and the 1989 Tiananmen Square protests and massacre; and the last 20 years where China was ruled by collective leadership.

Fenby, the author, edited the Hong Kong newspaper South China Morning Post between 1995 and 1999. He began to write books about China after his retirement, including The Penguin History of Modern China, his sixth book about the country. The book received mixed reviews. Reviewers praised it for providing captivating portraits of the book's characters through interesting anecdotes. They recommended it for providing an engaging overview of China's history over the past century and a half. Some commentators criticised the book for not relying on Chinese primary sources. They noted the book had errors and omissions as well as overemphasised less significant topics while undercovering more important ones.

== Biographical background and publication ==
The author, Jonathan Fenby, is a historian and a previous editor for The Observer. After being fired from The Observer in 1995, he received a job opportunity to move to Hong Kong to edit the South China Morning Post. Fenby's initial professional experience was largely in Europe, working in Paris for Reuters. In the 1960s, he was a war correspondent in Vietnam. He had no professional experience with China. Viewing the opportunity as a learning experience, Fenby decided to move to Hong Kong, stating, "For me, it was a push-pull thing. I didn't know what I would do if I stayed in England and this part of the world was interesting and something new to get to know."

Fenby edited the South China Morning Post between 1995 and 1999. In his post-retirement years, he started to author books on China. Fenby penned a memoir about what it was like living in Hong Kong. Titled Dealing with the Dragon: A Year in the New Hong Kong, it was about the first year after the handover of Hong Kong. It was Fenby's first book about China and was commercially unsuccessful. According to Fenby, "It got decent reviews but died a death because everyone had lost interest in Hong Kong by then." Despite this, the publisher Little, Brown and Company asked him to write a second book about China and suggested he write about Chiang Kai-shek, the adversary of Mao Zedong, the People's Republic of China founder. The result was Generalissimo: Chiang Kai-shek and the China He Lost, a book published in 2003. Before Fenby, English-language biographers accorded Chiang little attention. The historian Rana Mitter called that the book a "thoughtful, post-cold war interpretation" that demonstrated Fenby did not follow the conventional beliefs regarding the contemporary history of China. Fenby called Chiang "a major figure who made major mistakes. Like Chairman Mao." According to Mitter, Fenby's book did not depict Chiang as nascent supporter of democracy and did not portray him as ruthless ruler unconcerned with the hardships the population faced. Fenby later wrote Dragon Throne: China's Emperors from the Qin to the Manchu, a book profiling the Emperor of China, covering every emperor between Qin Shi Huang, the first one, to Puyi, the last emperor.

The Penguin History of Modern China was published in 2008 by the Penguin Books imprint Allen Lane. It is Fenby's sixth China-related book. It drew on Fenby's own experiences and the substantial research in English-language sources on China's history in the past century and a half. To bolster his narrative, he relied on contemporaneous English-language news articles. Fenby's method involves supporting his arguments after culling small portions of the primary sources. The book's discussion of the Cultural Revolution relied on the 2006 book Mao's Last Revolution by Roderick MacFarquhar and Michael Schoenhals. His chronicling of the 1989 Tiananmen Square protests and massacre relied on The Tiananmen Papers, a book edited by Andrew J. Nathan and Perry Link that compiles Chinese official documents about the massacre. Devoting 52 pages to a bibliography and notes, the book incorporates the most up-to-date scholarly work about the history of China. In response to criticism that the book omits original content based on Chinese sources and does not rely on interviews conducted with Chinese individuals, Fenby explained, "I read Chinese very badly. You could spend years in some of the Chinese archives and come up with little nuggets but it would be just a few paragraphs and it wasn't that kind of book. If you found an undiscovered letter from the Dowager Empress about gardening or something, it would only be of interest to historians."

The hardcover version of the book was quickly sold out. A paperback version was released in 2009. To publicise the book, Fenby make a three-week trip to Asia in 2009. He travelled on the Queen Mary 2 ship, gave talks in Hong Kong and Shanghai, and visited the Bookworm Literary Festival organised by the Beijing bookstore The Bookworm.

== Style ==
The Penguin History of Modern China is a popular history book. The Australian's Rowan Callick characterised Fenby's tone as "dependable, humanist and wry rather than judgmental" as he discusses bleak 20th-century China. The historian Rana Mitter said that Fenby is "not afraid of directness". When he discussed the Great Leap Forward, which caused numerous deaths by starvation, he did not use "academic euphemisms" like "misguided" or "ill-judged". Instead, he described the campaign as "mad". According to the historian Graham Hutchings, the book is "an engaging, convincing account" that both students and the public at large will find worthwhile. Fenby's book delves into people's characters with a particular focus on their quirks and flaws. Hutchings said that this, combined with Fenby's meticulous focus on specifics, animates the story and could retain an everyday reader's attention across the 700-page book.

According to Rosemary Righter of The Times, Fenby "excels at weaving the strands of his complex narrative into heroic and more often harrowing tales". She said that protagonists and antagonists get "sharp pen portraits". Fenby profiles the Dog Meat General and the Christian General, whose army move to the beat of "Hark! The Herald Angels Sing". Sun Yat-Sen is portrayed as "a disorganised lightweight", while Zhou Enlai comes across as a cold-hearted partner in Mao's atrocities. He includes a story about Soong Mei-ling, Chiang's wife, who visited Washington, D.C. to sway politicians and the rumour of her tryst with Wendell Willkie, the United States Republican Party presidential candidate. The Sunday Telegraph's George Walden said the anecdotes about unsavoury characters "lighten the tone" while Fenby discusses their misdeeds. Walden cited the Dog Meat General and Pockmarked Huang, as well as Big Ears Du, who hosted a dinner where each course was paired with a lady for the General. Edward Peters of the South China Morning Post wrote that the book "places the key events of the past century and a half into a broad, flowing narrative that is at once gripping and illuminating, yet is spiced with anecdotes and sketches that bring the book to life and raise some interesting questions". He cited Fenby's story about a 17-year-old girl who was sent to a Manchuria labour camp for praising shoe polish produced in the United States after Mao Zedong decided to stop the Hundred Flowers Campaign.

The Daily Telegraph book reviewer David Rennie said that Fenby employs "spare prose reminiscent of a war-crimes prosecutor" when discussing firsthand testimonies from survivors of the Nanjing Massacre. Fenby writes that people were "used for bayonet practice, nailed to boards and run over by vehicles, mutilated and disembowelled, sprayed with acid, or hung up by their tongues". Rennie said the book's tone is like that of an editorial, which is unsurprising owing to Fenby's background as a previous editor at The Observer and the South China Morning Post. Fenby shifts his tone multiple times. According to Rennie, Fenby acts sometimes as a prosecutor, aiming to pierce through the Chinese propaganda to uncover the facts. For example, he reports on how Zhou Enlai, a "moderate", directs that everyone in a traitor's family be killed and how the Communists created and peddled opium during the war. Rennie said that in a shift in tone, Fenby reveals "a journalist's eye for telling details" by discovering nuggets of information that "jolt and surprise". He cited Fenby's report that a colonel from the United States saw the low-spirited Nationalist soldiers entering the battlefield bound together to prevent any desertions. Another example Rennie cited was that during the Cultural Revolution, one group chose to save their ammunition by cutting off the ears of their adversaries instead of shooting them and let them die from the bleeding.

== Content ==
The Penguin History of Modern China is split into six parts. The first part of the book encompasses the Qing dynasty's final decades. The second part covers how Sun Yat-sen established the Republic of China before the country was nearly immediately plunged into the Warlord Era. The third part reviews the Second Sino-Japanese War and the fighting among the Japanese, Kuomintang, and Chinese Communists. The fourth part discusses Mao Zedong's reign. The fifth part reviews Deng Xiaoping's reign in which he promoted the policy of socialism with Chinese characteristics. The sixth part covers the last 20 years where China was ruled by collective leadership.

1850 is the book's starting point for China's contemporary history. Starting in chapter six, the book reviews China's turbulent 20th century. The book discusses Empress Dowager Cixi. Fenby chronicles the Qing government's insufficient reaction to local and global catastrophes led to the 1911 Revolution. He profiles the leadership of Sun Yat-sen, the Warlord Era, and the leadership of Chiang Kai-shek. Fenby reviews how the Chinese Communists went from the Long March to winning the civil war against the Kuomintang. Their triumph was owing to a confluence of factors: the Second Sino-Japanese War, Stalin's goal of maintaining China as a weak nation, the United States' involvement, the corruption of the Kuomintang, and the turbulent relationship between the Kuomintang and the Communists that went from working together in the 1920s to armed conflict later.

Fenby profiles Mao Zedong, describing him as a magnetic and mighty ruler who the citizenry supported following 50 years of strife and poor governance. He portrays Mao as cruel and egocentric. The book covers the Great Leap Forward, a collective farming initiative between 1958 and 1962 that caused the starvation deaths of millions of peasants, and the Cultural Revolution. Roughly one-third of the book is focused on China after Mao. It grapples with Deng Xiaoping's principle of socialism with Chinese characteristics in which the country adopts market economics while the Communist Party sustains its firm grip on power. The book spends four chapters on the 1989 Tiananmen Square protests and massacre.

== Analysis ==
The book sets 1850 as the beginning of China's modern history. According to the historian Pamela Kyle Crossley, Fenby gives minimal attention to the events then like the Taiping Rebellion and the Xianfeng Emperor's rule. She said he instead rushes to cover the intractable difficulties of governing China posed by its extensive lands, the inclination of leadership to overlook escalating global friction as the priority remains on near-term domestic issues, and the government's forceful leaders who ruled China after the Taiping Rebellion. Fenby's position in the book advances that of the historian Andre Gunder Frank, Crossley stated. Their position is that between Imperial China and Modern China, the country traditionally has been one of the most powerful, most populated, and richest countries globally. In their narrative, the 100 years between 1850 and 1950 was a departure from the typical state. Fenby argues that the reasons for China's ungovernability in the late Qing dynasty apply to the People's Republic of China.

The Daily Telegraph book reviewer David Rennie found that a recurring theme is Fenby's revulsion towards the callousness numerous rulers felt to the loss of Chinese lives. Fenby provides a number of examples: Chiang Kai-shek, the Nationalist leader, attempted to prevent the Japanese from proceeding by destroying the Yellow River's levees, causing the 1938 flood that affected millions of people. Chiang's soldiers killed the Chinese workers who were coerced to do levee fixes. Chiang Ching-kuo, his son, suggested years afterwards that "We didn't kill enough people" in explaining how the Communists defeated the Nationalists. Mao Zedong is documented as being open to nuclear warfare that would result in the deaths of half of humanity. Mao tells Stalin that the sacrifice of 400,000 Chinese lives would be justifiable to make the United States lose the Korean War. In response to the Great Leap Forward's causing 30 million people to die from famine, a Communist Party Secretary retorts, "Which dynasty has not witnessed death by starvation?" A student leader of the Tiananmen Square protests stated that China will not wake up until the square becomes "awash with blood". Graham Hutchings, a historian, said that Fenby is clear-eyed when reflecting on the toll exacted on the Chinese people during the country's efforts to modernise in the past century and a half. According to Hutchings, Fenby is correct to speculate about if the improved conditions in the last three decades indicate a new direction or just a brief pause from a nation grappling with "contradictions", a go-to Fenby utterance.

The Times's Rosemary Righter said the intense struggles for political power hold together the book's complex account. It starts with the Guangxu Emperor, a powerless yet good-intentioned ruler, whom Empress Dowager Cixi, held captive. The book continues to Deng Xiaoping, the "arch-survivor", who did a complete reversal. Righter said holding onto authority motivated the strategy shifts and the turmoil and human-engineered catastrophes that the Chinese endured was of no consequence to the leaders. According to Righter, Fenby's discussion of the "quasi-mystic" Taiping Rebellion and Boxer Rebellion contribute to why modern-day Chinese rulers are deeply suspicious of "people power" and occult groups like the Falun Gong. Fenby portrays how the Warlord Era and Chinese Civil War were marked by chaos and agonising brutality. Righter said this illustrates why the Chinese people dread "chaos" so much that they largely are willing to tolerate the limits placed on their liberties. It further illustrates how Mao is revered for uniting China even though his policies took the lives of a larger number of people than those lost under the rule of Adolf Hitler and Joseph Stalin.

== Criticism ==
According to the scholar Rana Mitter, compared to other works, the book places greater emphasis on the favourable attributes of the governments that ruled China before 1949. He cited that to ready themselves for the Second Sino-Japanese War, the Nationalist government instituted major changes through "fortifications ... constructing arsenals, development of the air force, and preparations for chemical warfare". Mitter said that while Fenby was correct to find that Chiang Kai-shek performed poorly against the Japanese, numerous more powerful administrations would have fallen to Japan's intense, brutal force. Another critique from Mitter was that the book is too severe in implying that prior to the 1911 Revolution, the Qing dynasty was not solely driven by cynicism when they held provincial elections. Mitter said the facts instead pointed to a strong passion toward change.

The scholar Graham Hutchings pointed out that the book has exclusions, annoyances, and inaccuracies. In the exclusions category, he said the book does not clearly state the reasons for the 1962 Sino-Indian War, while language and literacy are given little consideration. Another omission, he stated, is that Fenby insufficiently discusses the Qing government's savvy diplomacy near the end of its reign. Hutchings cited how the book could have included that the Qing aimed to manage the foreign existence in the country by voluntarily creating treaty ports. In the annoyances category, Hutchings disliked how Fenby persistently calls Sun Yat-sen "the doctor". He disapproved of how Fenby enjoys labeling the people he profiles with physical descriptors. Fenby calls Kang Youwei "square headed", Liang Qichao "sharp-faced", and both Yuan Shikai and Deng Xiaoping "bullet-headed". In his review of the book's footnotes, Hutchings called them "abundant and generally helpful" but determined that several were absent or incomplete.

In the inaccuracies category, Hutchings said that Fenby wrote, "China is the last great colonial empire on earth, hanging on to ethnically separate Tibet and the vast Muslim lands of Xinjiang", a statement that seems to forget Russia. Another error, he said, is that Fenby lists the New Guangxi clique's third participant as Huang Xuchu, but the correct person is Huang Shaohong. A third error is that in two instances, the book identifies Guangxi's capital during armed conflict as Nanning. But the actual capital was Guilin. A fourth error, Hutchings wrote, is that during the Korean War, "NATO allies" did not fight the North Korean and Chinese soldiers—it was the United Nations Forces.

The book's last section is about China's collective leadership in the past two decades. According to The Times's Rosemary Righter, that section is strangely abbreviated. She said that during that time period, a lot of China is changed drastically such that it is no longer familiar. Righter further criticised the voluminous bibliography for missing László Ladány's The Communist Party of China and Marxism, a book based on three decades of meticulous study on the discussions and writings emerging from China. Fenby's book should have relied more on primary sources in Chinese, she said. Fenby's book, Righter writes, accords too little weight to some topics and too much to others. Mao's 1959-initiated Great Leap Forward was "the worst manmade famine ever seen", leading 46 million people to die, while his 1966-initiated Cultural Revolution incited disarray and savagery to wipe out the foundation of their society. She said that Fenby accords insufficient weight to those two topics but spends much more space discussing the 1989 Tiananmen Square protests and massacre which though "dramatic and terrible" were "nowhere near as significant as these two great traumas".

Righter said that the book is too focused on politics to the exclusion of other topics. She bemoaned how the book barely discusses intellectual movements and how marginalised people contended with their circumstances. Another area that lacks coverage, Righter said, is the present-day "cultural revolution" where China people older than 40 face the largest economic inequality globally after the nation experienced imbalanced expansion. Righter further argued that Fenby exaggerates China's distinctive such as when he said "the emperors of China were like no other sovereigns on Earth, claiming to be intermediaries between Heaven and Earth". She cited several counterexamples: the holders of the Chrysanthemum Throne of Japan, the Pharaohs, and the Burmese monarchy.

== Reception ==
The historian Rana Mitter called The Penguin History of Modern China "a powerful revisionist account" of China, stating that Westerners must grasp its history to realise China's current and future impact on the world. He said it was "the first major history that looks at the country with the eyes of the 21st century rather than the 20th". The historian Graham Hutchings said that despite flaws like errors and omissions, the book was "a well-written, authoritative account of China's modern transformation." The journalist George Walden lauded the book for being "a miracle of thoroughness, truthfulness and readability—the perfect primer for a time when China is about to enter all our lives". In a mixed review, Isabel Hilton of The Observer wrote, "Fenby's history is stronger in some sections than others, and the post-Mao era is lightly treated" and concluded that the book is "a good place to learn" Chinese history.

The scholar Pamela Kyle Crossley penned a positive of the book, saying she savoured its "scope, vivacity and delight in character portraits". She said the book's "main virtue is that its milling of subplots, boisterous details, impatient anecdotes, and intrusive but very helpful statistics are guided by a tempered, far-seeing, compassionate presence". Rosemary Righter of The Times pointed out flaws like errors in the book but praised it for being a "vivid account" of how China's past continues to shape the current situation. Peter Foster, a Daily Telegraph editor, called the book "an extremely valuable primer for the general British reader" and "an admirably readable synthesis of events". The Bookseller reviewer Greg Eden penned a positive review of the book, calling it "an epic and hugely authoritative history of China", "a historical rollercoaster", "a profound study of the nature of political power and its abuse", and "a measured assessment of China's emergence as a major global force".

Edward Peters of the South China Morning Post wrote, "There is nothing startlingly new here, but Fenby compiles a concise and adept summary, moving the tale swiftly forward with occasional interpolations." In a review of the 2013 edition of the book, Manfred Wilhelmy von Wolff of the University of Chile journal Estudios Internacionale, wrote, "By telling us in a lucid and documented way the great plot of events of almost 170 years of Chinese history, Jonathan Fenby has made a contribution of great importance to our knowledge of a country that we still do not know more than in a very general way, for not to say superficial." The Australian's Rowan Callick said there are two main reasons for enjoying the book: the book has a "fund of wonderful stories and personal descriptions" and it has "balanced judgments" that are crucial since the Chinese government's narrative is significantly distorted.
