= Bookworm (disambiguation) =

A bookworm or bibliophile is an avid reader and lover of books.

Bookworm may also refer to:

== Arts, entertainment, and media ==
- Bookworm (comics), a comic strip in the Whoopee! and Whizzer and Chips comic books
- The Bookworm (painting), a 1850 painting by German painter Carl Spitzweg
- "The Bookworm" (short story), a short story by Pu Songling
- Bookworm (Tiny Toon Adventures), a character on the cartoon Tiny Toon Adventures
- Bookworm (video game), a 2003 word-forming puzzle video game by PopCap Games
  - Bookworm Adventures, a 2006 follow-up game
- Bookworm, an American radio show on literature hosted by Michael Silverblatt
- The Bookworm (1994–2000), a BBC television programme on literature hosted by Griff Rhys Jones
- The Bookworm, a villain in the 1960s Batman TV show
- The Bookworm, a 1939 Metro-Goldwyn-Mayer animated short
- Bookworm, a screenplay by David Mamet that became the 1997 movie The Edge
- "Bookworm, Run!", a 1996 science fiction short story by Vernor Vinge
- Bookworm, a 2024 adventure comedy drama film by Ant Timpson
- Ascendance of a Bookworm, a manga series written by Miya Kazuki

== Other uses ==
- Bookworm (insect), a popular generalization for any insect which supposedly bores through books
- The Bookworm (bookstore), an independent bookstore in Beijing, China
- Bookworm, the codename of version 12 of the Debian Linux operating system
