= Henry Parham =

American veteran (1921–2021)

- Born: November 15, 1921; Greenville, Virginia, US
- Died: July 4, 2021 (aged 99)
- Branch: United States Army
- Conflicts: Operation Overlord
- Awards: Legion of Honor

Henry Parham (November 15, 1921 – July 4, 2021) was an African American veteran of the D-Day invasion and World War II.

== Biography ==
Born November 15, 1921, in Greenville, Virginia, Parham was drafted in 1942 to serve in the Second World War. He landed on Omaha Beach on June 6, 1944, as part of Operation Overlord.

His battalion, the 320th Very Low Altitude Anti-Aircraft Barrage Balloon Battalion, downed 73 planes through the use of barrage balloons. He was to have served in the War in the Pacific after VE Day, but his transport was delayed due to mechanical problems and Japan surrendered before he shipped out.

He was awarded the Legion of Honor in 2013. At the time of his death on July 4, 2021, he was the "last surviving African American combat veteran of D-Day".
