= Waverly B. Woodson Jr. =

US Army soldier

Waverly Bernard Woodson Jr.
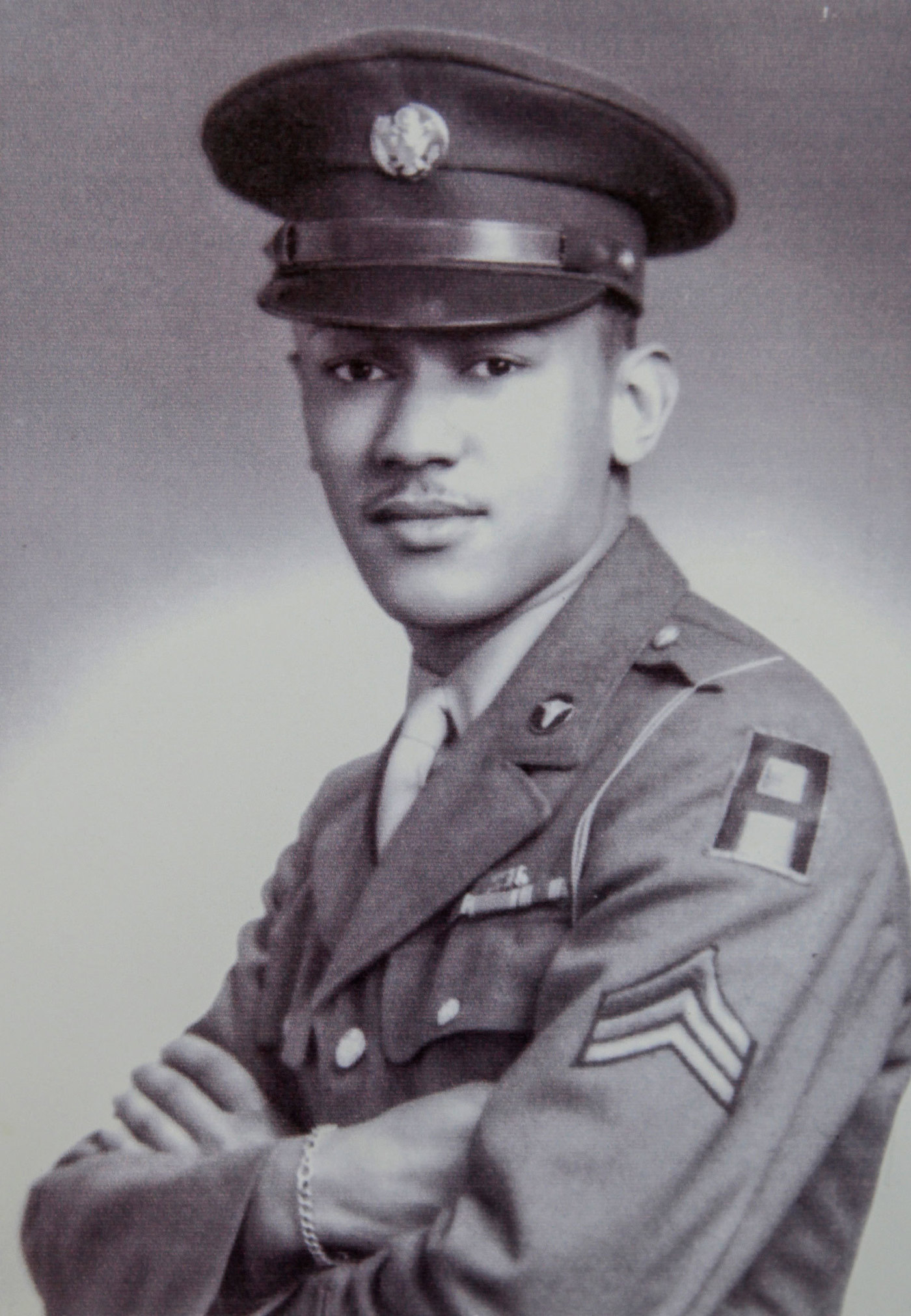
- Woodson's official US Army portrait, taken while he held the rank of sergeant.
- Born: August 3, 1922; Philadelphia, Pennsylvania, U.S.
- Died: August 12, 2005 (aged 83); Gaithersburg, Maryland, U.S.
- Burial place: Arlington National Cemetery
- Alma mater: Lincoln University
- Spouse: Joann Katharyne Snowden (m. 1952)
- Children: 3
- Military career
- Allegiance: United States
- Branch: United States Army
- Service years: 1942–1945, 1950–1952
- Rank: Staff sergeant
- Nickname: Woody
- Unit: 320th Barrage Balloon Battalion
- Conflicts: World War II; * Western Front; ** Overlord; Korean War
- Awards: Distinguished Service Cross; Combat Medical Badge; Bronze Star Medal; Purple Heart; Good Conduct Medal; American Campaign Medal; European–African–Middle Eastern Campaign Medal with Arrowhead device and two Bronze Stars; Asiatic–Pacific Campaign Medal; World War II Victory Medal; National Defense Service Medal; Korean Service Medal; United Nations Medal

Waverly Bernard Woodson Jr. (August 3, 1922 – August 12, 2005) was an American staff sergeant and medical professional. He is best known for his heroic actions as a combat medic for the First Army during the Battle of Normandy in World War II, for which he was awarded the Distinguished Service Cross, the United States Army's second highest military decoration for soldiers who display extraordinary heroism in combat.

== Biography ==
=== Early life ===
Waverly Bernard Woodson Jr. was born on August 3, 1922, at 1235 North 58th Street in Philadelphia, Pennsylvania, where his father worked as a mail carrier. After graduating from Overbrook High School, he began studying at Lincoln University in Oxford, Pennsylvania, where he was a pre-med student.

=== Military career ===
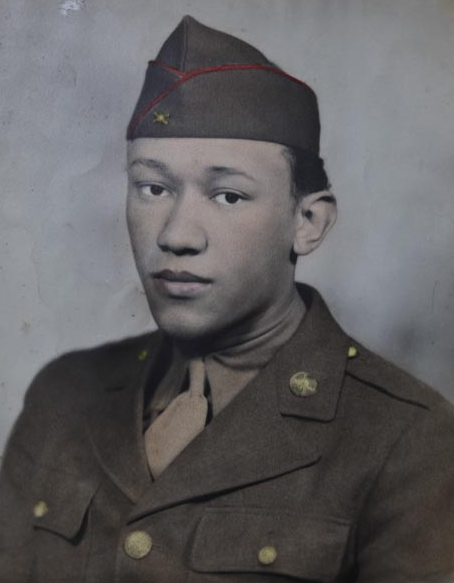
Woodson's original official US Army portrait.

After the entry of the United States into World War II, Woodson – then in his sophomore year – put his studies on hold, enlisting in the United States Army on December 15, 1942, alongside his younger brother Eugene. After scoring highly on an aptitude test, he joined the Anti-Aircraft Artillery Officer Candidate School, where he was one of only two African Americans. Before completing the course, Woodson was informed that he would not be able to be billeted in the United States Army Coast Artillery Corps due to his race. As a result, he was retrained as a combat medic and assigned to the 320th Barrage Balloon Battalion. Woodson underwent training at Camp Tyson, the United States' barrage balloon training center in Paris, Tennessee, where he experienced segregation and discrimination. By the time of Operation Overlord, he held the rank of corporal. In advance of Operation Overlord, Woodson was deployed to England.

On June 6, 1944, the 320th Barrage Balloon Battalion participated in the Battle of Normandy as part of the First Army; it was the only African American battalion to participate. Woodson was assigned to a landing craft tank, LCT 856, that was to land at Normandy in the early morning. While coming ashore at Omaha Beach as part of the third wave, Woodson's LCT hit a naval mine and lost power, drifting ashore with the tide. While drifting, the LCT was hit by an "eighty-eight" shell and Woodson suffered shrapnel injuries to his groin, inner thigh, and back. Upon swimming to the shore and having his wounds treated, Woodson and other medics set up a field dressing station under a rocky embankment by the German defensive position designated "WN61" and began treating other wounded soldiers. Woodson worked continuously from 10:00 AM until 4:00 PM on the following day while under "intense" artillery and small arms fire. During the 30 hours, he carried out procedures including setting limbs, removing bullets, bandaging wounds, applying sulfa powder, dispensing plasma, and amputating a foot. After being relieved, Woodson was collecting bedding when he was alerted to three British soldiers having been submerged while leaving their LCT; Woodson provided artificial respiration to the three men, reviving them. Woodson was subsequently hospitalized due to his wounds; after three days on a hospital ship he requested to return to the front.

It has been estimated that Woodson's actions during the Battle of Normandy saved the lives of as many as 200 soldiers, both black and white. Woodson's commanding officer recommended him for a Distinguished Service Cross for his actions, but the office of general John C. H. Lee determined that Woodson's actions warranted the greater honor of a Medal of Honor. United States Department of War special assistant to the director Philleo Nash proposed that President Franklin D. Roosevelt should give Woodson an award personally. Woodson ultimately received a Purple Heart. He was also approved to receive a Bronze Star Medal in 1945, but was never awarded it due to being redeployed out of Europe. The Philadelphia Tribune wrote, "the feeling is prevalent among Negroes that had Woodson been of another race the highest honor [a Medal of Honor] would have been granted him."

Shortly after the Battle of Normandy, the 320th Barrage Balloon Battalion was redeployed to the United States, where it underwent further training at Camp Stewart in Georgia. The Battalion was then redeployed to Hawaii to prepare for Operation Downfall, which was cancelled upon the surrender of Japan in August–September 1945. With the subsequent end of World War II, Woodson was moved to the United States Army Reserve.

Woodson initially hoped to study medicine, but was unable to find a medical school that would admit him as an African American. He went on to complete his studies at Lincoln University, graduating in 1950 with a degree in biology.

Woodson was reactivated by the Army upon the outbreak of the Korean War in 1950. He was initially assigned to train combat medics at Fort Benning in Georgia, but due to his race he was instead reassigned to the Walter Reed National Military Medical Center where he served as the sergeant-in-charge-morgue, performing autopsies. During the Korean War, Woodson was promoted to the rank of staff sergeant. Woodson left the Army in 1952.

=== Later life ===
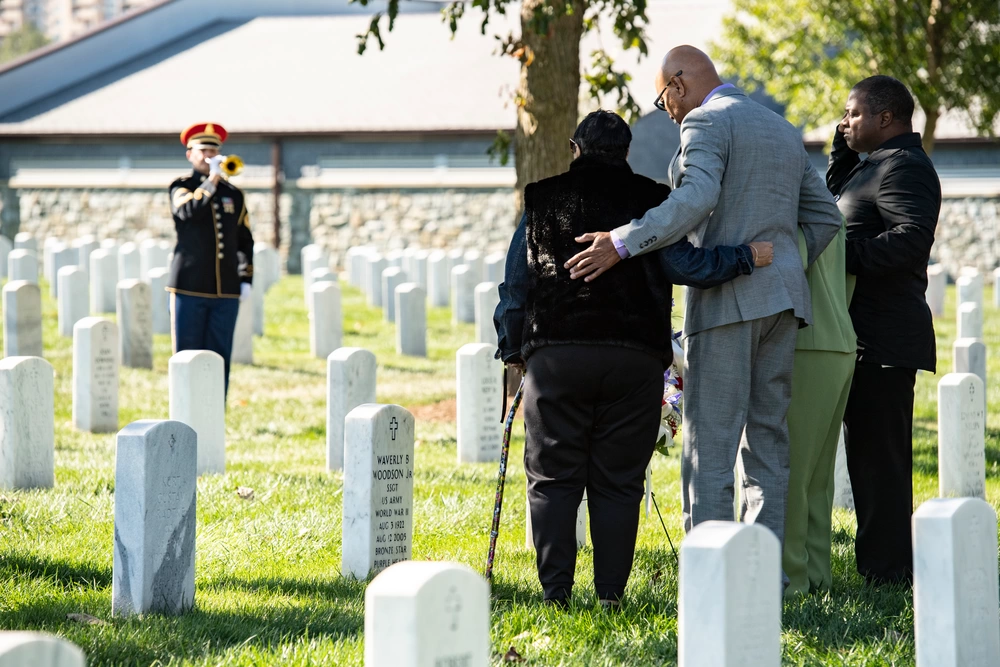
Woodson's grave in Arlington National Cemetery.

Woodson married Joann Katharyne Snowden in 1952; the couple had two daughters and a son.

After leaving the Army, Woodson went on to work in the Bacteriology Department of the National Naval Medical Center in Bethesda, Maryland. In 1959, he began working in the Clinical Pathology Department of the National Institutes of Health (also in Bethesda) where he supervised the staffing and operation of operating theaters and performed post-operative clinical procedures for open-heart surgery and other in-patient procedures. Woodson retired in 1980.

In 1994, Woodson was one of three veterans invited to visit Normandy by the Government of France to commemorate the 50th anniversary of the D-Day landings. He was presented with a commemorative medallion.

Woodson died on August 12, 2005, in the Wilson Health Care Center in Gaithersburg, Maryland at the age of 83. He was buried with military honors at grave 1,172 in Arlington National Cemetery. His papers were donated to the Langston Hughes Memorial Library Special Collections at his alma mater, Lincoln University.

== Awards and decorations ==
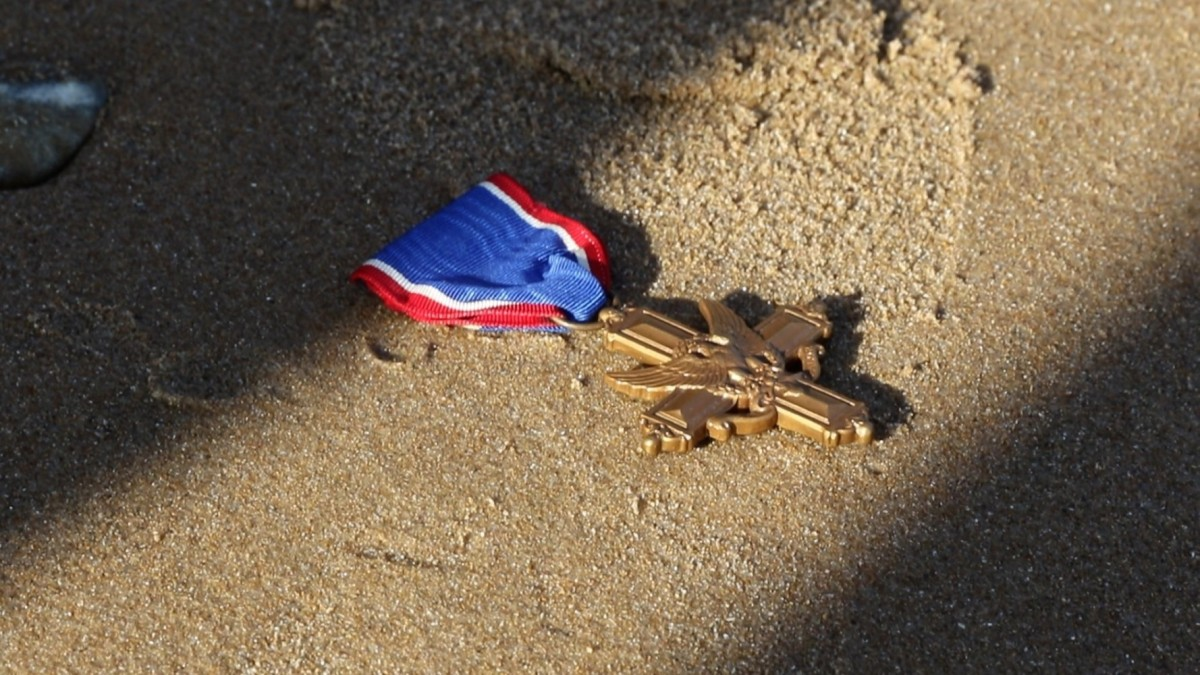
The Distinguished Service Cross posthumously awarded to Woodson.

Woodson received the following awards and decorations:

- Distinguished Service Cross
- Combat Medical Badge
- Bronze Star Medal
- Purple Heart
- Good Conduct Medal
- American Campaign Medal
- European–African–Middle Eastern Campaign Medal with Arrowhead device and two Bronze Stars
- Asiatic–Pacific Campaign Medal
- World War II Victory Medal
- National Defense Service Medal
- Korean Service Medal
- United Nations Medal

== Legacy ==
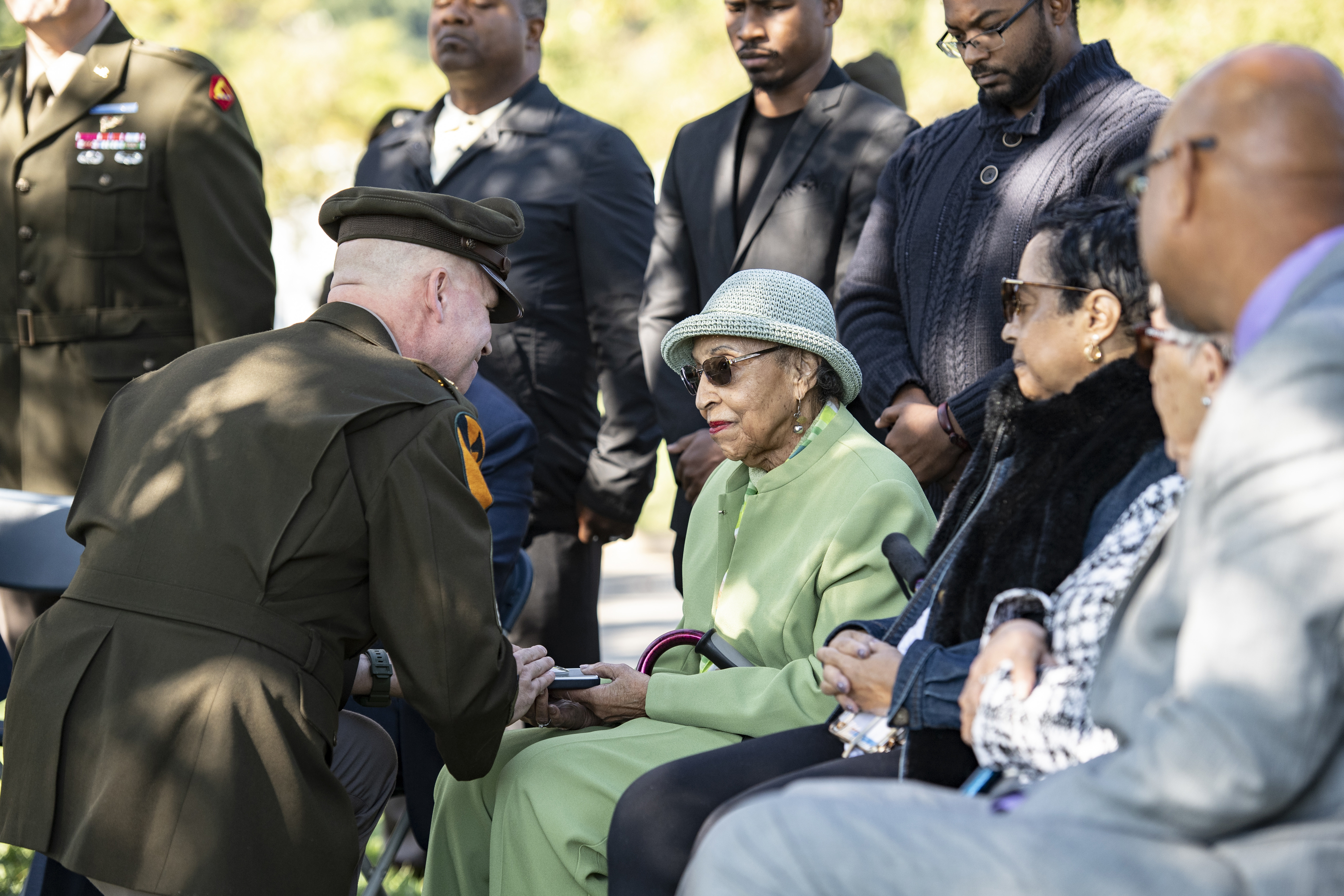
Command Sergeant Major Chris Prosser of United States Army Forces Command presenting Woodson's widow Joann with Woodson's Bronze Star Medal and Combat Medic Badge in October 2023.

Despite his acknowledged heroism, Woodson did not receive the Medal of Honor. This has been attributed to racial discrimination and to the National Personnel Records Center fire in 1973 that destroyed around 80% of the Army's personnel records. In September 2020, United States Senator Chris Van Hollen introduced bill S.4535: "A bill to authorize the President to award the Medal of Honor to Waverly B. Woodson, Jr., for acts of valor during World War II". An equivalent bill, H.R.8194, was also introduced in the United States House of Representatives by David Trone; the bill did not receive a vote. Woodson's widow Joann has announced that, if Woodson was posthumously awarded the Medal of Honor, she would donate it to the National Museum of African American History and Culture. In June 2021, Commanding General of the First United States Army Thomas S. James Jr. wrote in favor of Woodson receiving the Medal of Honor. In August 2020, Woodson was approved for the Combat Medical Badge; in October 2023, he was posthumously awarded the Combat Medical Badge (and formally presented with his Bronze Star Medal from 1945) in a ceremony at Arlington National Cemetery attended by his widow, family, and friends along with military personnel, including the retired United States Army lieutenant generals Stephen Twitty and Thomas S. James Jr. In June 2024, Senator Van Hollen announced that Woodson would posthumously be awarded the Distinguished Service Cross, the United States Army's second highest military decoration for soldiers who display extraordinary heroism in combat. The Cross was laid on Omaha Beach before being presented to Woodson's widow.

There is an exhibit at the visitor center of the Normandy American Cemetery and Memorial in Colleville-sur-Mer, France commemorating Woodson's actions during the Battle of Normandy. A brick commemorating Woodson has been installed at the National D-Day Memorial in Bedford, Virginia.

In 2015, Lincoln University created a collection of Woodson's letters and medals along with photographs and newspaper articles about Woodson at its Langston Hughes Memorial Library.

Author Alan Gratz based the character Henry Allen in his 2019 novel Allies on Woodson.

In April 2022, the Rock Island Arsenal Health Clinic at Rock Island Arsenal in Rock Island County, Illinois was renamed the Woodson Health Clinic in honor of Woodson. Woodson's son Stephen attended a ceremony to mark the renaming where he unveiled a portrait of Woodson.

In 2024, Woodson was featured on the docuseries Erased: WW2's Heroes of Color, which aired on National Geographic, Disney+, and Hulu. He was portrayed by Francesco Di Rauso.

In July 2024, it was announced that Philadelphia City Council would rename the corner of 58th Street and Girard Avenue in Philadelphia (near Woodson's childhood home) "Sgt. Waverly B. Woodson Way".

In October 2024, the First Army Division West dedicated its conference room at Fort Cavazos, Texas to Woodson.
