= Jonathan Fenby =

British newspaper editor (born 1942)

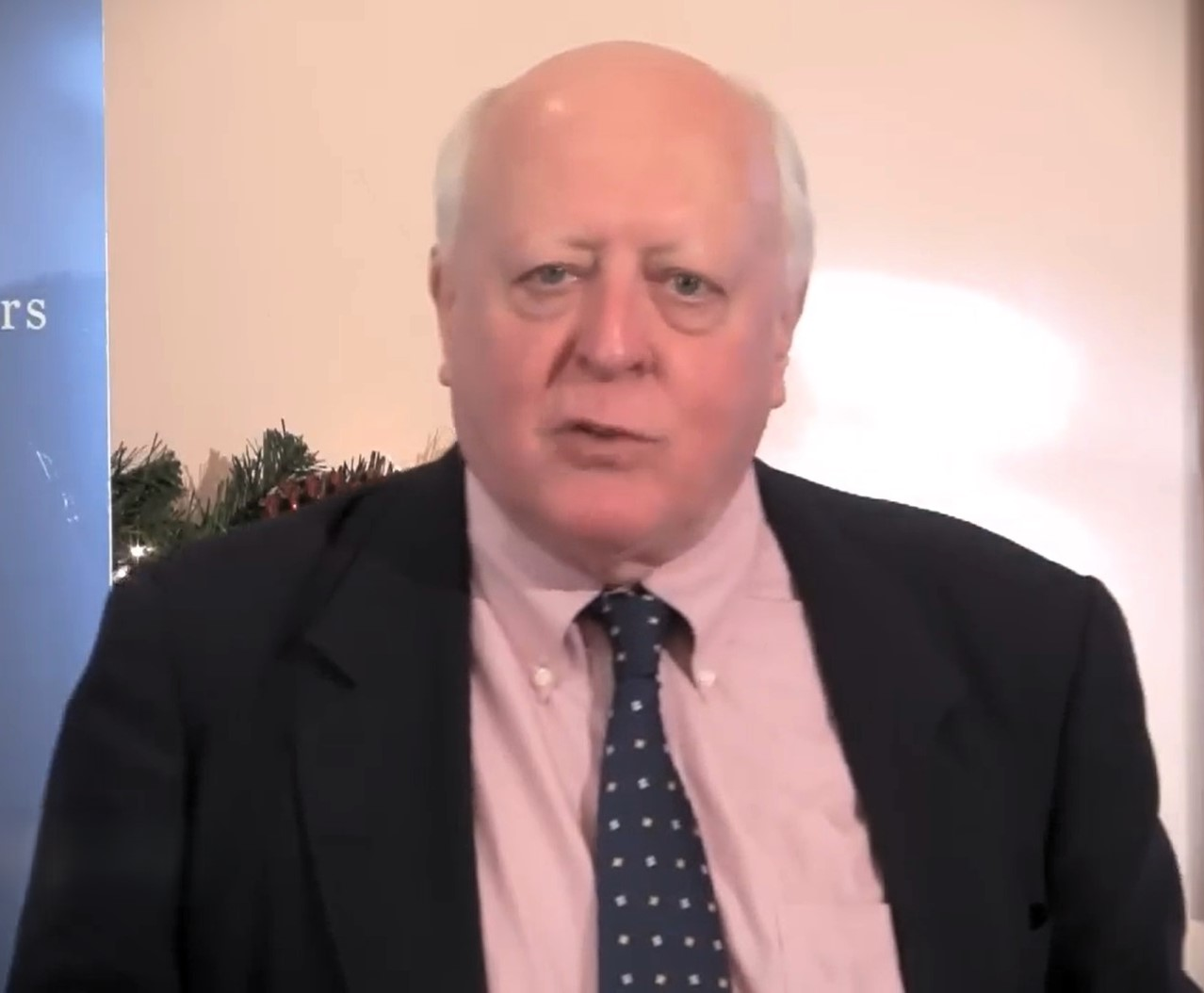
Fenby speaks to the Institute of International and European Affairs in 2012

Jonathan Fenby CBE (born 11 November 1942) is a British writer, analyst, historian and journalist who edited newspapers in Britain and Asia.

He was Editor of Reuters World Service from 1973 to 1977 and then held senior editorial posts at major news organisations in Britain, Europe and Hong Kong. He headed the China Team at the research service Trusted Sources from 2006 to 2022 where he was also a founding partner and a managing director at Trusted Sources an emerging markets research and consultancy firm headquartered in London which merged with Lombard Street Research in 2016. His investment and strategy research was focused towards policy interpretation, politics and the broader political economy including East Asian politics and strategy.

He has written twenty books, including The General: Charles de Gaulle and the France He Saved and Generalissimo: Chiang Kai-shek and the China he lost. His books predicted the slowing of China's economy and the concentration of political power by Xi Jinping as well as the rise of the far right in France. He has worked as an editor and foreign correspondent at publications including The Observer and the South China Morning Post. He was made a CBE by Britain for services to journalism in 2000. In 2013, the government of France awarded Fenby the status of a Chevalier of the Légion d'honneur for his contributions promoting Anglo-French understanding.

== Education ==
Fenby was educated at King Edward VI School, Birmingham and at Westminster School, an independent school for boys in central London, followed by New College at the University of Oxford.

== Career ==
Fenby joined Reuters in 1963, and reported from Europe and Vietnam as well as working as an editor at the head office in London. He was Paris bureau chief from 1968 to 1973 before being appointed as Editor of the agency's World Service in 1973. After leaving Reuters in 1977, he joined The Economist where he was chief correspondent in both Paris and Bonn (1981-1986) and wrote three books. He then became the first home editor of The Independent (1986–1988) and then deputy editor of The Guardian (1988–1993), followed by the editorship of The Observer from 1993 to 1995 and then of the South China Morning Post from 1995 to 2000 during the return of Hong Kong to Chinese sovereignty.

After returning to London from Hong Kong in 2000, Fenby wrote extensively about China for British and other publications as well as working at various on-line services and as associate editor of the newspaper Sunday Business. In 2006, he was a founding partner at Trusted Sources in charge of the analytical service on China, which he visited frequently.

Between 1998 and 2019, he published 17 books, nine on China, four on France and others on the Second World War and the shaping of the world after 1945. He is quoted in press in the UK, US and Far East and broadcasts, as well as speaking at conferences and lecturing at universities and public forums on China.

Fenby was appointed a Commander of the Most Excellent Order of the British Empire (CBE) in the 2000 New Year Honours List for services to journalism, and was appointed a Knight of the French National Order of Merit in 1997, and then of the French Légion d'honneur. He is an Associate of the London School of Economics (LSE) and the School of Oriental and African Studies (SOAS), and is on the advisory board of the financial forum, OMFIF.

== Personal life ==
He is married to Renée. He has two children, Alex and Sara, and five grandchildren, Alice, Max, Lola, Kate and Ella.

== Bibliography ==
- The Fall of the House of Beaverbrook (with Lewis Chester), Andre Deutsch,1979. ISBN 0233971610
- On the Brink: The Trouble with France. Little, Brown. 1998. ISBN 0316646652.
- Dealing with the Dragon: A Year in the New Hong Kong. New York: Arcade Publishing. 2001. ISBN 978-1-55970-559-2.
- Generalissimo: Chiang Kai-shek and the China He lost, Free Press, 2003. ISBN 9780743231442.
- The Sinking of the Lancastria: Britain's Worst Naval Disaster and Churchill's Cover-up, Carroll & Graf, 2005. ISBN 9780786715329.
- Alliance: The Inside Story of How Roosevelt, Stalin and Churchill Won One War and Began Another. MacAdam Cage. 2006. ISBN 9781596922532.
- The Seventy Wonders of China, Thames & Hudson, 2007. ISBN 9780500251379
- Dragon Throne: the imperial dynasties of China (with Alexander Monro, Luke Hambledon), Quercus, 2008, ISBN 9781847244062
- The Penguin History of Modern China: The Fall and Rise of a Great Power, 1850 to the Present, Penguin Press and Harper Collins, 2008. New Edition 2019 ISBN 978-0-7139-9832-0
- The General: Charles de Gaulle and the France He Saved, Simon and Schuster, 2010. ISBN 978-1-84737-392-2
- Tiger Head, Snake Tails: China today, how it got there and where it is heading, Simon & Schuster, 2012. ISBN 9781847373939
- The siege of Tsingtao. Penguin UK. 2014. ISBN 9780857977830.
- Will China Dominate the 21st Century?, Polity, 2014 second edition 2016 ISBN 978-0745679266
- France on the brink: a great civilization in the new century (2nd ed.). New York: Arcade Publishing. April 2014. ISBN 978-1-62872-317-5.
- The History of Modern France, Simon & Schuster, 2015. ISBN 1471129292
- Crucible: The Year that Shaped Our World, Simon & Schuster, 2018 ISBN 9781471155031

== See also ==
- List of foreign recipients of the Légion d'Honneur by decade

Media offices
Preceded by Peter Cole	Deputy Editor of The Guardian; 1988–1993	Succeeded by Alan Rusbridger
Preceded by Donald Trelford	Editor of The Observer; 1993–1995	Succeeded by Andrew Jaspan
Preceded by	Editor of South China Morning Post; 1995–2000	Succeeded by Robert Keatley
