= William G. Dabney =

U.S. Army veteran granted the Legion of Honour

William Garfield Dabney
- Born: June 24, 1924; Roanoke, Virginia
- Died: December 12, 2018 (aged 94); Roanoke, Virginia
- Spouse: Beulah Mae Cardwell (maiden)
- Military career
- Allegiance: United States
- United States Army: 320th Barrage Balloon Battalion
- Corporal: Corporal
- Conflicts: D-Day
- Awards: Legion of Honour - Knight (2009)

William Garfield Dabney (June 24, 1924 – December 12, 2018) was an African-American resident of Roanoke, Virginia, who served in World War II. He was awarded the French Legion of Honor for his actions during the invasion of Normandy. Notably, Dabney — one of the last known surviving soldier from the 320th Barrage Balloon Battalion, the only all-black unit in the D-Day landings — did not receive the honor until the sixty-fifth anniversary of D-Day – 18 days shy of his eighty-fifth birthday.

== Early life ==
Dabney was born in June 1924 in Altavista, Virginia, the youngest of nine children born to Edgar Stephenson Dabney (1884–1963) and Elinor Helena Whitlock (maiden; 1890–1937). They all lived on the family farm near Altavista, Virginia. When he was 12, his mother, Elinor, died. His maternal grandparents had died before he was born and his paternal grandparents, Fleming Dabney (1851–1926) and Martha Payne (maiden; 1856–1933) died when he was young. After the loss of his mother, he went to live with his maternal grandmother's sister, Carretta Bailey (née Carretta Augusta Lee; 1875–1970) in Roanoke.

== World War II ==
Dabney enlisted in the US Army December 9, 1942 – at age 18 years, 5 months – before graduating from high school. He was initially assigned to the U.S. Army Coast Artillery Corps, Mine Planter Service. Dabney's Army serial number began with "1," which indicated he voluntarily enlisted. The other soldiers teased him about enlisting, and every time he complained about something, the other troops said he did not need to be there – he had volunteered.

Dabney was a corporal in the 320th Barrage Balloon Battalion, the only all-black unit in the D-Day landings on Omaha and Utah, the two beachheads assigned to American forces. The barrage balloons were on long cables that would be caught by the wings or propellers of German airplanes, and if the planes pulled the balloons into contact, explosives on the helium balloons would destroy the aircraft. On D-Day, three German fighters were downed by barrage balloons as they tried to strafe the American soldiers on the beach.

== Post-war life ==
After the war, Bill Dabney returned to a still segregated Roanoke, where he graduated from high school and then earned an electrical engineering degree. But discrimination prevented him from following his trade, so he became a carpet layer and ran his own business for 40 years.

On December 22, 1951, in Lynchburg, Virginia, Dabney married Beulah Mae Cardwell (maiden). They had three sons: Vincent Garfield Dabney, Michael Glenn Dabney (1954–2019), and Marlon Dabney.

William G. Dabney sat for an interview and gave an oral history of his life and his experiences to The National WWII Museum in 2013. His interview was digitally recorded; transcripts and videos are available online.

=== Death ===
Dabney died on December 12, 2018, at the age of 94 in Roanoke, Virginia. He is buried at Williams Memorial Park in the South Washington Heights neighborhood of Roanoke.

== Honors ==
On 5 June 2009 (the 65th anniversary of D-Day), as the 320th's last known survivor, Dabney was awarded a Knight of the French Legion of Honor in Normandy (France). In recognition of his services during World War II, William Dabney was also given the key to the City of Roanoke, Virginia.
