= Saraya (newspaper) =

Jordanian online newspaper

- Type: Daily
- Format: Online newspaper
- Owner(s): Khubrani Media and Advertising Company
- Founder: Hashim Al Khalidi
- Editor-in-chief: Seif Obeidat
- Founded: 2007
- Language: Arabic
- Headquarters: Amman
- Website: www.sarayanews.com

Saraya (Arabic: سرايا) is an Arabic online newspaper based in Amman, Jordan. It was blocked by the Jordanian government in June 2013.

== Profile ==
Hashim Al Khalidi is the owner of the website. The editor-in-chief is Seif Obeidat. The rate of readership for Saraya in 2010 was 24% according to Alexa, making it third mostly visited website in Jordan. In a market study carried out by Ipsos in March 2012 it was established that Saraya was among the top 20 most visited websites in the country along with two other news portals, namely Ammon News and Khaberni. It was the 15th most visited website in the Arab world in 2012, too. In April 2013, Saraya was the 9th most visited website in the country. The Alexa data showed in June 2013 that the website was among the mostly visited news websites.

In June 2013, it was blocked by the government along with more than other 200 websites. The reason for the blocking was the websites' improper publications and organization according to the new press and publications law.

In January 2015 both the owner and editor-in-chief of Saraya were arrested by the Jordanian authorities due to their supposedly aiding terrorism and spreading false news.
