= Marie-Odette Dubois-Violette =

French mathematician (1918–2004)

Marie-Odette Dubois-Violette (1918-2004) was the first female Inspector General of National Education in France.

== Personal life ==
She was born in 1918 in France, and her father was Léon Blaise. She married the physicist Pierre-Louis Dubois-Violette.

== Career and honors ==
From 1942 to 1945, she received a research grant from the CNRS. From 1946 to 1950, she was a researcher at the CNRS while working on her thesis; she obtained her doctorate in 1951.

She was a member of the jury for the mathematics agrégation in the late 1960s.

From 1971 until 1976 she was the first female Inspector General of National Education in France.

She retired in 1976.

She was named a Chevalier of the Legion of Honor in 1977.
