= Randa Habib =

French journalist

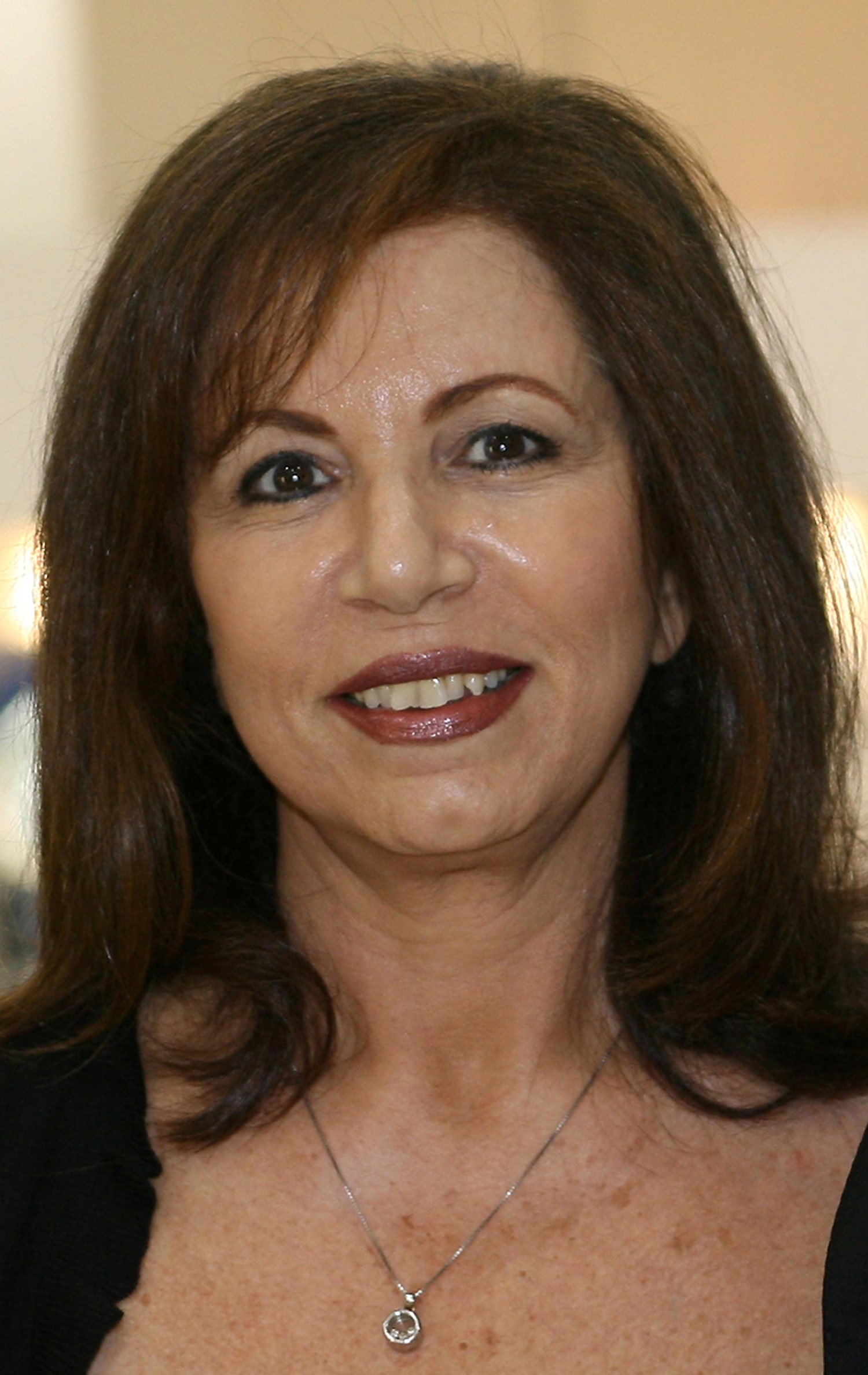
Habib in 2011.

Randa Habib is a French journalist of Lebanese origin, who as director of the Amman, Jordan, bureau of Agence France-Presse (AFP), one of the three global news agencies, since 1987, has spent 25 years covering war, politics and economic development in the Middle East. She has reported extensively in Iraq and other areas of conflict and interviewed royalty and leaders throughout the region. Habib has been named director for the Middle East and North Africa for the AFP Foundation as of 1 April 2012.

== Early life and education ==
Habib was born in Beirut, Lebanon, to Farid Habib and Hind Tammer. Her father was Lebanon's former ambassador to Yugoslavia, Greece, Venezuela, Brazil and Iraq. Habib earned her high school diploma in Rio de Janeiro, before receiving a bachelor's degree in Administrative and Political studies at the Saint Joseph University in Beirut.

== Career ==
While at university, Habib worked at the Lebanese weekly "Magazine" before joining AFP in 1980 and becoming its bureau chief in Amman in 1987. She was also Radio Monte Carlo correspondent from 1988 to 2005. In 1996, Habib founded the first Foreign Press Club in Jordan. She interviewed Jordan's late King Hussein more than 20 times, and was granted the first interview with his son King Abdullah II in 1999, less than three weeks after he took power. Habib is on the board of directors of the Jordan Media Institute (JMI), a non-profit organization that seeks to help enhance journalism in the Middle East. From 1980s to February 2011 she had a column in Jordan Times. Also until June 2011, she had a column in Ammon News.

In 2012, AFP Foundation, a non-profit-making organization set up by AFP to provide training to journalists in developing countries, appointed Habib as its director for the Middle-East and North Africa.

== Awards ==
In 2001, Habib was awarded by the French president the decoration of "Chevalier de l'Ordre National du Merite". And in July 2008, she was awarded the highest decoration in France, the “Ordre national de la Légion d'honneur” (French: "National Order of the Legion of Honour").

== Books ==
Habib is the author of book "Hussein and Abdullah: inside the Jordanian Royal family," which was printed in London in January 2010. The book's French version was published in November 2007 and Arabic in August 2008.

== Family ==
Habib is married to business consultant Adnan Gharaybeh and the couple has two children, Saif and Yara.
