= The General (Fenby book) =

The General: Charles de Gaulle and the France He Saved
- First edition hardcover image
- Author: Jonathan Fenby
- Language: English
- Subject: Charles de Gaulle
- Published: 2010
- Publisher: Simon & Schuster
- Publication place: United Kingdom
- Pages: 707

The General: Charles de Gaulle and the France He Saved is a non-fiction book authored by the British historian and journalist Jonathan Fenby. Published in 2010 by Simon & Schuster, the biography details the life and times of the iconic French statesman Charles de Gaulle, with the 20th-century history of the senior general and politician's nation also receiving focus.

In summary, Fenby concludes that de Gaulle's impressive achievements truly merit the widespread sense of "the General" as being the greatest modern Frenchman. Being a decorated hero of the First World War, the statesman possessed a striking sense of personal destiny that fueled his defiance against the Nazi Germany during the Second World War and led to his role as leader of the Free French Forces.

In establishing the French Fifth Republic from the ashes of a conflict-torn Europe, Fenby writes, de Gaulle imposed his will upon the French people in a manner that set up a strong presidential system and ensured the state's survival. Isolated from power within a short period, de Gaulle managed to save France yet again during the Algerian War. While fickle and without good graces in terms of personal character, de Gaulle still dies after he had accomplished two great achievements.

The book was released to widespread acclaim. Supportive reviews have appeared in publications such as History Extra, Kirkus Reviews, and The Observer. Writing for the latter journal, the historian Andrew Hussey credited the success to Fenby's ability to "write about French political culture from the inside".

== Background ==
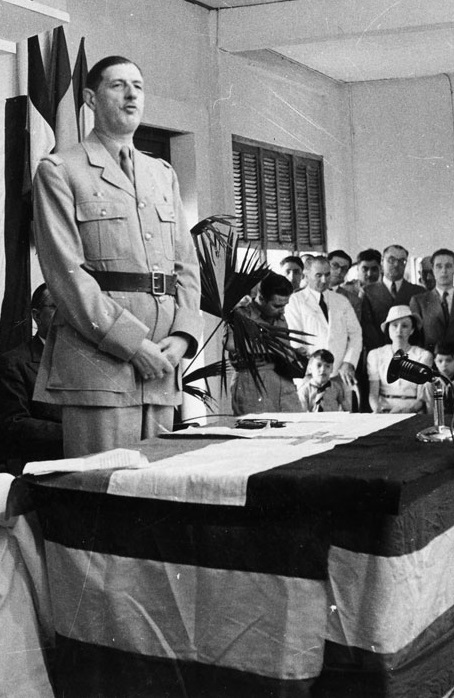
De Gaulle speaks at the inauguration of the Brazzaville Conference in January 1944.

The author had worked as a journalist for publications such as the South China Morning Post. He had additionally written books such as On the Brink: The Trouble with France.

== Summary ==
Fenby aims to capture a holistic picture of de Gaulle's life. He describes de Gaulle as possessing a strong sense of destiny and firm set of ideals. Despite having a disciplined and determined personality, the appreciative husband and father still had an individual character with a fickle and often-conflicted streak. Endowed with a sense of destiny having given him a place in history, de Gaulle lacked multiple traits, including personal graces.

De Gaulle's early life features service in the First World War, which Fenby described to make a decorated war hero. The Frenchman then makes his initial appearance on the world stage in a particularly fateful time during World War II, with the events of June 1940 leading the previously-unknown and newly-appointed French general to become deputy defence minister. A desperate appeal for Anglo-French union, Fenby writes, linked de Gaulle with the British statesman Winston Churchill for the first time.

With the blitzkrieg rapidly advancing into France, the announcement came in June 1940 that Paris was an "open city" and a de facto surrendered to the invaders took place. With no battle having taken place and hardly any sign of resistance encountered, the capitulation of France appeared complete. The previously-obscure de Gaulle decided to get flown by the British to London, England, and to make what became known as the appel du 18 juin on 18 June from the studios of the BBC. The popular speech constituted not only a rallying cry for those still supporting French pride but also a call for French resistance at all levels. Fenby notes that the flight and subsequent delivery of the address nearly failed to happen because of maneuverings within the overwhelmed French government. De Gaulle's leadership of the French government-in-exile during the war and other actions in resisting the Axis powers receive additional detail in Fenby's writing.

In broad terms, Fenby views de Gaulle's conduct during the Second World War and the statesman's role in ending the Algerian War in the mid-20th century as establishing a larger-than-life cultural persona.

== Reception ==
The historian Andrew Hussey of The Observer wrote a supportive review remarking that the "impressive account" of de Gaulle's life, written in a "finely nuanced and highly readable" style, revealed the statesman "as a master of spin as much as the saviour of his nation". Hussey also praised Fenby's complex take on de Gaulle's legacy after the Second World War ended. The General "escapes easy classification" and has a heroic legacy with an element of tragedy to it. Hussey also commented that Fenby debunked "many of the Anglo-American myths about" de Gaulle, given that the author was "able to write about French political culture from the inside".

Kirkus Reviews lauded the book. Their review stated that "the astute and psychologically probing" work "does an excellent job portraying" de Gaulle "as a truly larger-than-life, uncompromising and incomparable character who acted as his country's conscience and rudder". The diary-like writing style of multiple sections particularly attracted praise.

In addition, Professor Malcolm Crook wrote for History Extra that the "excellent study" of de Gaulle constituted a "blockbuster" befitting such a notable individual. Crook judged that Fenby's writing was "brimful of fascinating insights", which make the book "a delight to read".

== See also ==
- 2012 in literature
- Jonathan Fenby bibliography
  - Chiang Kai-shek: China's Generalissimo
  - On the Brink: The Trouble with France
