= Ammon News =

Jordanian online newspaper

- Type: Daily
- Format: Online newspaper
- Owner: Sameer Al Hyari
- Founder: sameer Al Hyari
- Editor-in-chief: ahmad Al Hyari
- Founded: 2006
- Language: Arabic; English
- Headquarters: Amman, Mecca St.
- Website: Official Arabic website Official English website

Ammon (in Arabic عمون) also known as Ammon News is a private news agency and alternative news body based in Amman, Jordan. It is the first online newspaper in the country. The agency has both Arabic and English language websites. The name of the agency, Ammon, refers to ancient name of Amman, capital city of Jordan.

== History and profile ==
Ammon News was launched in 2006 by Sameer Al Hayari and Bassel Elkour, being the first online newspaper of Jordan.

Alhyari is the editor-in-chief of the news portal. Dr.Ahmad alhyari is the managing editor of Ammon News. He also contributes to the website in parliamentary affairs. The agency which is run from a cafe in Amman describes itself as the voice to the "silent majority". It provides news which is not published in print media through its both Arabic and English news portals.

According to Forbes, Ammon News is the first and most visited website in the Arab world and one of the top 5 media in the Middle East. Also, based on the 2010 Alexa data Ammon News had a readership of 38%, making it the most visited website in Jordan. As of 2011 it was the most popular website in the country with 250,000 daily visitors according to Alexa. It was the fifth most visited website in the Arab world in 2012. In a market study carried out by Ipsos in March 2012 it was established that Ammon News was among the top 3 most visited websites in the Country

== Attacks and blocks ==
In February 2011, the website of Ammon News was disabled following the publication of a statement by 36 leading Jordanian tribesmen who called for democratic and economic reforms in Jordan. In addition, unknown people also attacked the owners of the news portal on the same date. Randa Habib, a veteran journalist, published articles in a column in English and Arabic portals of the Ammon News until June 2011 when the Jordanian government implemented pressure related to the statement mentioned above. Regarding the hacking Bassel Elkour argued that it had been perpetrated by Jordan Intelligence. The Jordanian authorities denied his claim.

The website was blocked, temporarily, by the Jordanian government in June 2013 when it refused to comply the new press law in order to protest it.
