= Barrage balloon =

Large balloon tethered with metal cables

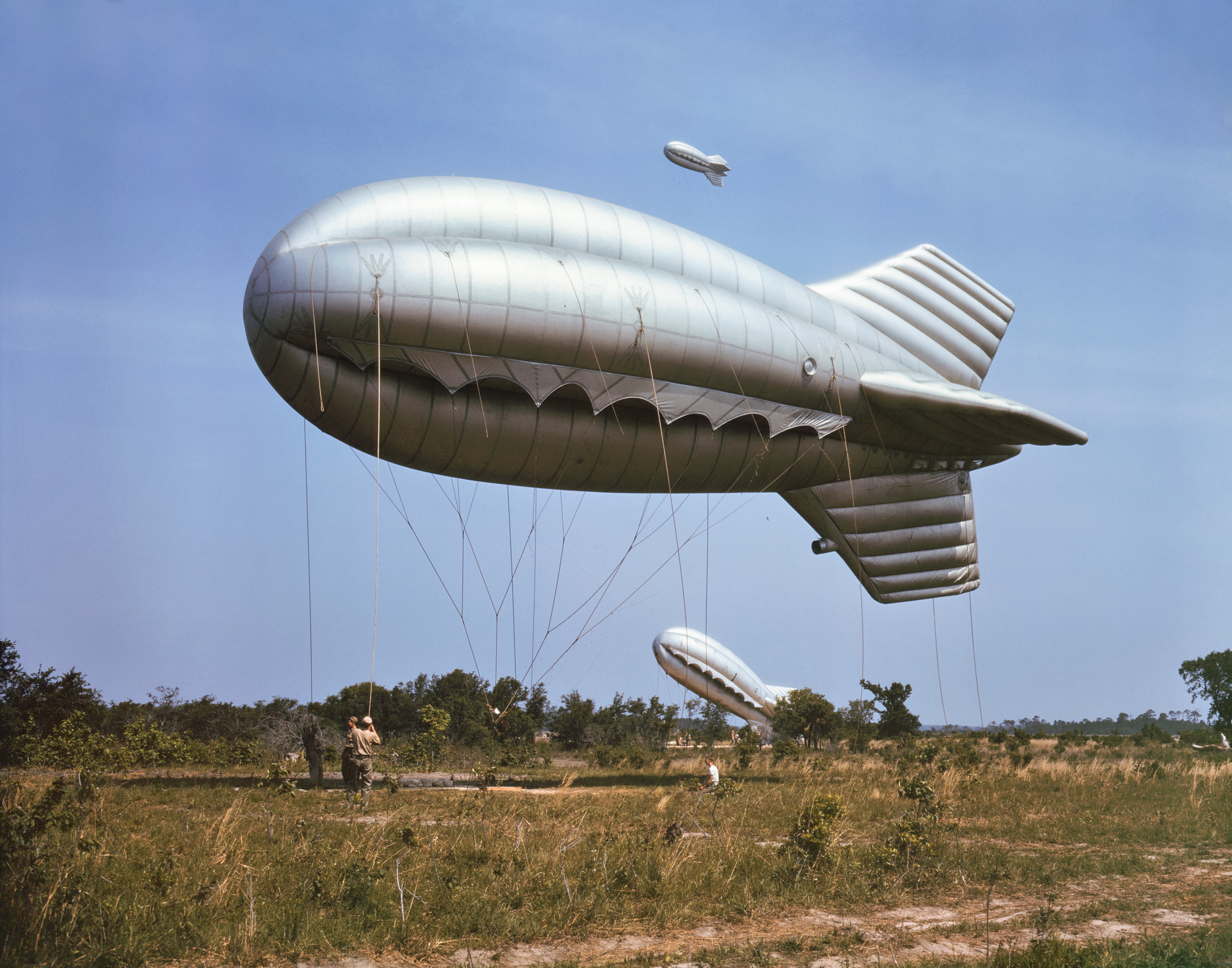
US Marine Corps barrage balloon, Parris Island, South Carolina, in May 1942

A barrage balloon is a type of airborne barrage, a large uncrewed tethered balloon used to defend ground targets against aircraft attack, by raising aloft steel cables which pose a severe risk of collision with hostile aircraft, making the attacker's approach difficult and hazardous. Early barrage balloons were often spherical. The kite balloon, having a shape and cable bridling that stabilizes the balloon and reduces drag, could be operated at higher wind speeds than a spherical balloon. Some examples carried small explosive charges that would be pulled up against the aircraft to ensure its destruction. Barrage balloons are not practical at higher altitudes, due in large part to the cable's weight.

Barrage balloon use is most associated with World War II. They became obsolete soon afterwards, with the advent of high-altitude jet aircraft and longer-range missile and bomb systems.

== First World War ==
France, Germany, Italy, and the United Kingdom used barrage balloons in the First World War. While the French and German forces developed kite balloons, early British barrage balloons were spherical.

Sometimes, especially around London, several balloons were used to lift a "barrage net" length: a steel cable was strung between the balloons, and more cables hung from it. These nets could be raised to an altitude comparable to the operational ceiling (15,000 feet or 4,600 metres) of the bombers of the time. By 1918 the barrage balloon defences around London stretched for 50 miles (80 km), and captured German pilots expressed great fear of them.

== Second World War ==
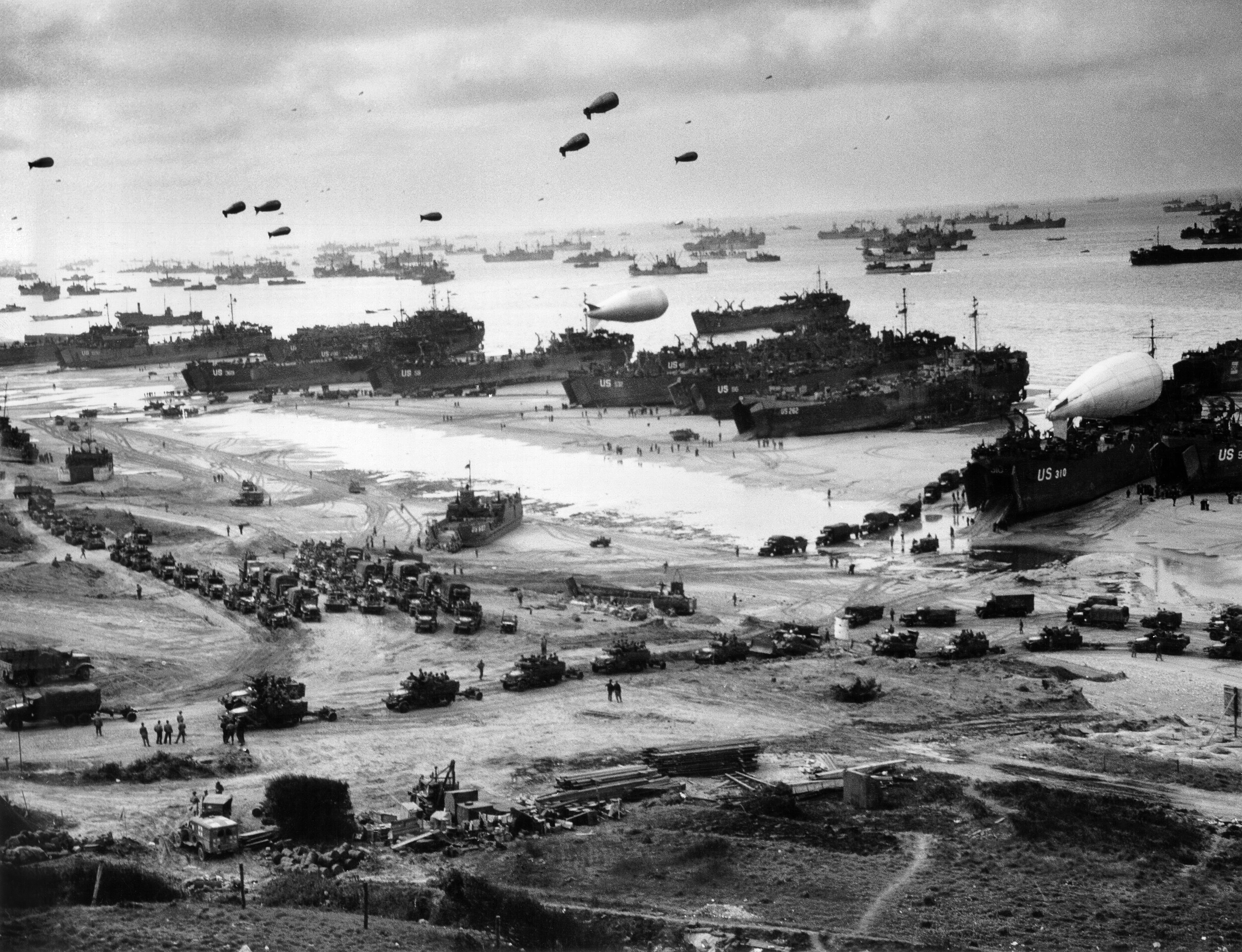
Landing ships putting cargo ashore on one of the invasion beaches during the Battle of Normandy. Note the barrage balloons, raised by the 320th Barrage Balloon Battalion.

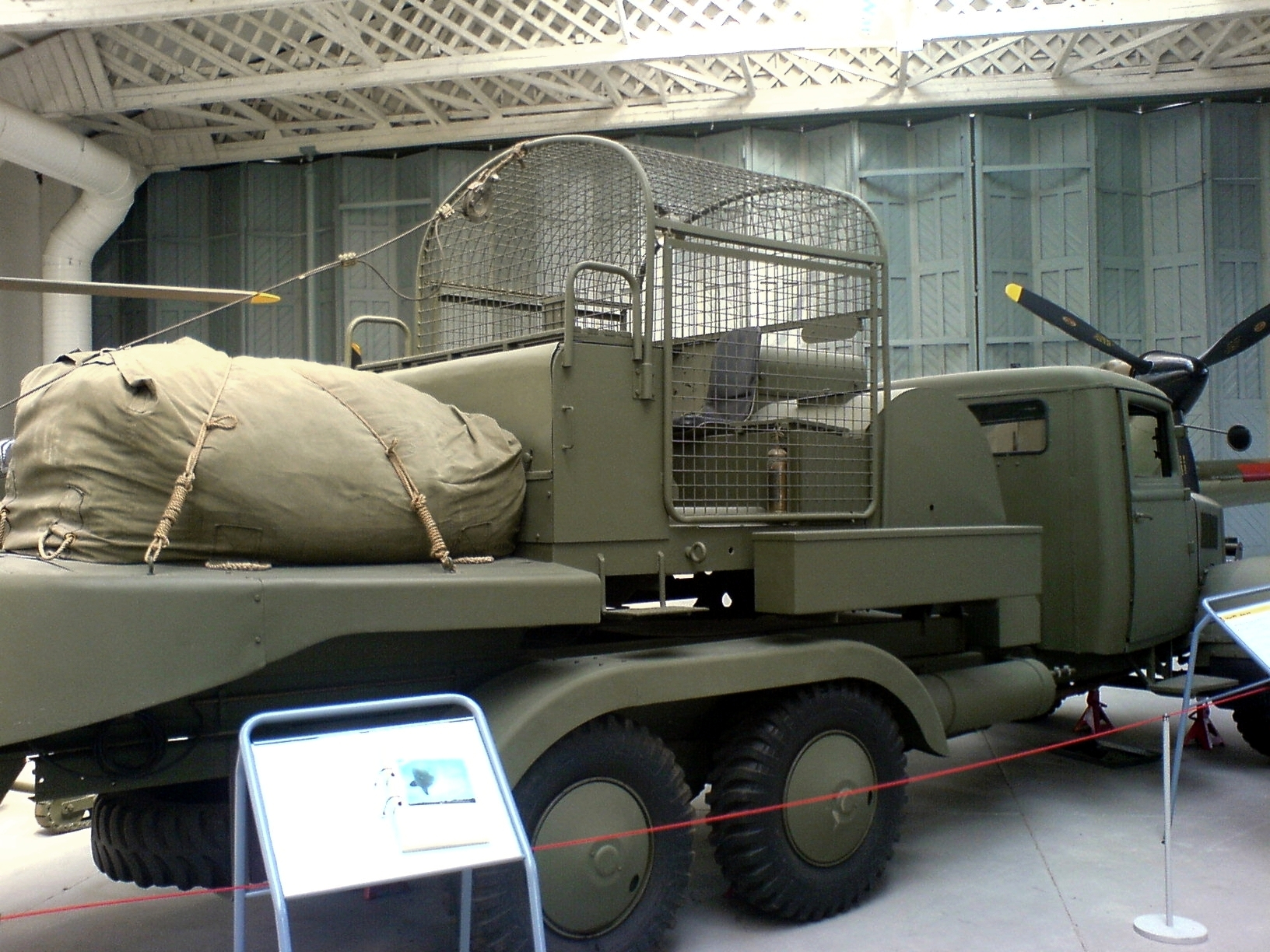
Balloons could be launched from specialised vehicles.

In 1938, the British Balloon Command was established to protect cities and key targets such as industrial areas, ports, and harbours. Balloons were intended to defend against dive bombers flying at heights up to 5,000 feet (1,500 m), forcing them to fly higher and into the range of concentrated anti-aircraft fire: anti-aircraft guns could not traverse fast enough to attack aircraft flying at low altitude and high speed. By the middle of 1940, there were 1,400 balloons, a third over the London area.

While dive-bombing was a devastatingly effective tactic against undefended targets, such as Guernica and Rotterdam, dive-bombers were very vulnerable to attack by fighter aircraft when pulling up after having completed a bombing dive. Due to the effectiveness of the Royal Air Force fighters' tactic of waiting for a dive bomber to complete its dive and then pouncing when it was pulling up—a moment when it was slow and vulnerable—the use of dive bombers against the UK was discontinued by Nazi Germany. Balloons proved to be of little use against the German high-level bombers with which the dive-bombers were replaced, but continued to be manufactured nonetheless until there were almost 3,000 in 1944. They proved to be effective against the V-1 flying bomb, which usually flew at 2,000 feet (600 m) or lower but had wire-cutters on its wings to counter balloons. 231 V-1s are officially claimed to have been destroyed by balloons.

The British added two refinements to their balloons, "Double Parachute Link" (DPL) and "Double Parachute/Ripping" (DP/R). The former was triggered by the shock of an enemy bomber snagging the cable, causing that section of cable to be explosively released complete with parachutes at either end; the combined weight and drag bringing down the aircraft. The latter was intended to render the balloon safe if it broke free accidentally. The heavy mooring cable would separate from the balloon and fall to the ground under a parachute; at the same time a panel would be ripped away from the balloon causing it to deflate and fall independently to the ground.

The 320th Barrage Balloon Battalion, a Very Low Altitude barrage balloon battalion of the United States Army, participated in the June 1944 Normandy landings, raising barrage balloons on Omaha Beach and Utah Beach. They remained stationed at Normandy until October 1944.

In January 1945, during Royal Navy Fleet Air Arm raids on the Palembang oil refineries, the British aircrews were surprised by the massive use of barrage balloons in the Japanese defences. These were spherical and smaller than the British type. One Grumman Avenger was destroyed, and its crew killed, from striking a balloon cable.

Barrage balloons were partly filled with highly flammable hydrogen. "The top of the balloon was filled with hydrogen, the bottom half was left empty, so when it was put up at a certain height it filled with natural air", according to Dorothy Brannan, barrage balloon volunteer in Portsmouth, England.

=== Power line disruption ===
In 1942, Canadian and American forces began joint operations to protect the sensitive locks and shipping channel at Sault Ste. Marie along their common border among the Great Lakes against possible air attack. During severe storms in August and October 1942 some barrage balloons broke loose, and the trailing cables short-circuited power lines, causing some localised disruption to mining and manufacturing. In particular, metals production was disrupted. Canadian military historical records indicate that one of the more serious incidents, known as "The October Incident", caused an estimated loss of 400 tonnes (440 short tons; 390 long tons) of steel and 10 tonnes (11 short tons; 9.8 long tons) of ferro-alloys.

As a result, balloons were stored during the winter months and training was improved. Lessons learned from breakaway balloons led to Operation Outward, intentional release of balloons trailing conductive cables to disrupt power supplies on the occupied European mainland.

=== Target identification ===
On the road to Aachen in west Germany in 1944, the British 2nd Tactical Air Force floated barrage balloons along the American First Army sector front line (a.k.a. "bomb line") to designate the location of friendly troops during the air assault preceding the advance of ground forces, which took Aachen on 21 October 1944. Conversely, during the First Army advance past Aachen to nearby Düren, barrage balloons were floated eastward to mark the location of enemy troops to be bombed.

== Post-war nuclear weapon tests ==
After the war, some surplus barrage balloons were used as tethered shot balloons for nuclear weapon tests throughout most of the period when nuclear weapons were tested in the atmosphere. The weapon or shot was carried to the required altitude slung underneath the barrage balloon, allowing test shots in controlled conditions at much higher altitudes than test towers. Several of the tests in the Operation Plumbbob series were lifted to altitude using barrage balloons.

== See also ==
- Aerostat – Lighter-than-air aircraft
- Observation balloon – Military crewed balloon
- Tethered balloon – Hot air balloon attached to the ground
