= The Bookworm (bookstore) =

The Bookworm was a China-based literary organization with three bookstores by the same name in Beijing, Chengdu and Suzhou. As of November 2019 all locations have closed. In addition to selling books, The Bookworm was a restaurant, cafe, event space and library with more than 50,000 English and Chinese titles. Lonely Planet called it one of the "world's greatest bookshops."

Every March since 2007, The Bookworm has organized the Bookworm Literary Festival, billed as "a celebration of literature and ideas" featuring international and Chinese authors. It is one of the largest bilingual cultural festivals in China.

The Bookworm also manages the China Bookworm Press, launched in 2015, a publishing imprint that seeks to publish contemporary Chinese fiction and non-fiction in translation, and MaLa, an English-language literary journal that is "from and about China" and accepts short fiction, poetry, non-fiction, reviews and photography.

== History ==
The Bookworm was set up in a Beijing courtyard in the Sanlitun area in 2002 by Alexandra Pearson in the venue that is now occupied by The Tree. This was a small lending library with a basic drinks selection. The following year it was forced to move from that location so the books were transferred into the nearby French restaurant Le Petit Gourmand. It was there that The Bookworm's events program developed. By 2005 Le Petit Gourmand was scheduled for demolition, and it was then that Pearson joined forces with a small group of friends and investors to find a permanent home for The Bookworm.

The premises on Sanlitun South Street where The Bookworm is currently located was leased in September 2005. In 2006 Peter Goff opened the Chengdu branch of The Bookworm, and in 2007 he opened the Suzhou branch. Pearson served as Group CEO from 2005 to 2013, during which time Goff had primary responsibility for the Chengdu and Suzhou operations. Jenny Niven ran The Bookworm's Events program from 2006 to 2010 and directed the Festival from its inception until 2010. In 2013 Pearson returned to her home country, the United Kingdom, and Goff took over as Group CEO.

As of September 2016, about 3,000 authors have given talks and events at The Bookworm in Beijing.

== The Bookworm Literary Festival ==
The Bookworm Literary Festival is an independently run and privately funded two-week literary festival initiated in March 2007.

The general program includes book talks, panel discussions, workshops and performances. Events are primarily held in its venues in Beijing, Chengdu and Suzhou, but also in partner venues and in other cities such as Shanghai, Chongqing and Ningbo. A concurrent children's program features storytelling sessions, illustration and writing workshops, and book talks, while a schools program takes authors into local schools and universities to give talks and other events.

The 9th Bookworm Literary Festival, held March 13–29, 2015, featured more than 120 authors from nearly two dozen countries, highlighted by Chang-rae Lee, Yasmina Khadra, Tahar Ben Jelloun, Willis Barnstone and Victoria Hislop. There was a special "Spotlight on Canada" that featured Rawi Hage, Madeleine Thien, Kim Thuy, Dennis Bock, Vincent Lam and Douglas Gibson, the longtime editor of Alice Munro. Previous festival attendees have included Dave Eggers, Yu Hua, David Sedaris, Gary Shteyngart, Lionel Shriver, Junot Díaz, Amitav Ghosh, Xiaolu Guo, Benjamin Zephaniah, Yiyun Li, Peter Hessler and Nobel laureate Mo Yan, among others.

In an article in 2011, the Wall Street Journal wrote about the Bookworm Literary Festival: "When Bookworm started, for instance, local expats in Beijing—accustomed to more open societies with better access to books and ideas—found a light in the literary darkness of China... they may not spearheading the kind of movement the Communist Party fears, but they may be sowing the seeds of more vibrant Chinese expression."

Goff is the current Bookworm Literary Festival director. Anthony Tao is the coordinator in Beijing and Catherine Platt is the coordinator in Chengdu.

== The Word Alliance ==
The Bookworm Literary Festival is a founding member of The Word Alliance, a gathering of eight major literary festivals across the world. Also in this association are the Edinburgh International Book Festival, Toronto's International Festival of Authors, New York's PEN World Voices Festival, India's Jaipur Literary Festival, the Berlin International Literature Festival, France's Étonnants-Voyageurs and the Melbourne Writers Festival. The Word Alliance is "a strategic international partnership which supports and showcases the work of writers, facilitates the creation of international literature projects and provides opportunities to enhance each festival's artistic programme."

== Year-round program ==
The Bookworm's three venues holds literary, cultural and community events on a regular basis. These include book launches, readings, discussions, storytelling sessions, comedy, workshops, book club and writing group meetings, and musical performances. "The Bookworm is a top choice for book launch parties and monthly gatherings of various special interest groups," Alon Halevy wrote in the book The Infinite Emotions of Coffee. Cultural events present a range of local or international culture, while the community events tend to rotate around networking/information events with environmental, civil society or educational themes.

== Awards and accolades ==
The Bookworm has received numerous awards, accolades and citations over the years:

- #7 on Lonely Planet's list of World's Greatest Bookshops, listed among 10 bookstores that include City Lights Books in San Francisco, Shakespeare & Company in Paris, and Daunt Books in London. Lonely Planet said, "The Bookworm does everything a good bookshop should do – which is a lot more than sell books."
- #6 of 20 most beautiful bookstores in the world on Pinterest.
- Flavorwire called The Bookworm one of the "20 most beautiful bookstores in the world."
- #8 of 20 "coolest bookstores in the world," according to the Vancouver Sun.
- Skyscanner includes The Bookworm in its list of "22 most beautiful bookshops in the world."
- #6 of 20 "most stunning bookstores in the world" on rediff.
- The Toronto Star said The Bookworm was "fast becoming one of the world's great literary venues."

== Bookshop ==
The Bookworm's bookshops offer books in both English and Chinese, currently with about 70 percent of the titles being in English. It focuses primarily on Asian-interest fiction and non-fiction, literary fiction, travel, cooking, children's and best-selling/prizewinning fiction and non-fiction from around the world.

== China Bookworm Press ==
The China Bookworm Press "seeks to publish leading contemporary fiction and non-fiction from China and make it available both in the original Chinese and to a wider international audience in translation."

Its annual China Bookworm Literary Award is an open call for unpublished manuscripts by mainland Chinese writers, with the winner getting his or her novel translated and published in English. The first winner will be announced this summer.

== Flash Europa 28 ==
In conjunction with the EU Delegation to China, The Bookworm ran a project called Flash Europa 28. Flash Europa 28 is a concept that The Bookworm conceived that aims to showcase European flash fiction and offers free, original, creative content to the Chinese online reader. The project distributes European flash fiction written by young authors from each of the 28 member states of the European Union. Through national competitions five submissions were selected from each EU member state, translated into Chinese, and the 140 stories were distributed free of charge, over a period of 28 weeks to Chinese audiences via multiple social media platforms. As an international EU-China collaborative project, artists from the Beijing Film Academy matched each story with a piece of artwork.

These stories have been read more than 4 million times as of October 2016.
