= 320th Barrage Balloon Battalion =

- Country: United States
- Branch: U.S. Army
- Role: Aerial reconnaissance Artillery observer
- Size: Battalion
- Engagements: World War II

The 320th Barrage Balloon Battalion was an African American United States Army unit that saw combat in Europe during World War II.

== History ==
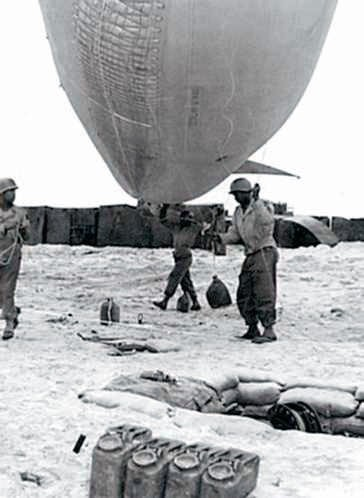
Soldiers of the 320th Barrage Balloon Battalion preparing to raise a barrage balloon at Omaha Beach during Operation Overlord

The 320th Barrage Balloon Battalion was a VLA (Very Low Altitude) barrage balloon battalion. It "was raised up in 1942 just a year after the Coast Artillery Corps took over responsibility for barrage balloons from the Army Air Corps." The 320th trained at Camp Tyson in Paris, Tennessee. In November 1943, they relocated to England to prepare for the invasion of Europe.

Their first assignment was Utah and Omaha beaches on 6 June 1944 (the D-Day invasion). The mission of the 621-man assault force was to raise hydrogen-filled barrage balloons to protect assaulting infantry and armor from being strafed by enemy aircraft. "They flew at an altitude of around 200 feet to defend soldiers landing on the beaches against strafing attacks by German aircraft." A commendation by Supreme Allied Commander Gen. Dwight D. Eisenhower cited the unit for conducting "its mission with courage and determination, and proved an important element of the air defense team". The battalion served 140 days in France. In late July 1944, Battery A of the 320th moved from Omaha Beach to the port city of Cherbourg. The remaining three batteries stayed on Omaha and Utah Beaches until early October, when deteriorating weather prevented ships from landing. The battalion's service in France came to an end on 24 October, when the men boarded ships bound for England. "By the end of October 1944, the 320th VLA Battalion was on its way back to Camp Stewart, Ga., to train for service in the Pacific Theater. They eventually made it as far as Hawaii before the war ended."

The 320th Barrage Balloon Battalion was unique at Normandy for two reasons. First, it was the only American barrage balloon unit in France and second, it was the first black unit in the segregated American Army to come ashore on D-Day. Five battalion medics were the first to land on Omaha Beach at approximately 9 a.m. A wounded medic, Waverly B. Woodson Jr., was nominated for the Medal of Honor, though he never received it. In 2020 four members of U. S. Congress proposed legislation authorizing the President to award it posthumously. He was posthumously awarded the Distinguished Service Cross, the United States Army's second highest military decoration for soldiers who display extraordinary heroism in combat, in 2024.

The VLA units used smaller barrage balloons weighing only 35 pounds (16 kg) that could easily be moved by a few men and transported across the channel on landing craft. A standard balloon crew was normally five men, but the 320th reduced crews to three and four men for the Normandy invasion.

Henry Parham, the last surviving member of this unit, died in July 2021.

== See also ==
- Military history of African Americans
