= List of Légion d'honneur recipients by name (S) =

The French government gives out the Legion of Honour awards, to both French and foreign nationals, based on a recipient's exemplary services rendered to France, or to the causes supported by France. This award is divided into five distinct categories (in ascending order), i.e. three ranks: Knight, Officer, Commander, and two titles: Grand Officer and Grand Cross.

Knight is the most common and is awarded for either at least 20 years of public service or acts of military or civil bravery. The rest of the categories have a quota for the number of years of service in the category below before they can be awarded. The Officer rank requires a minimum of eight years as a Knight, and the Commander, the highest civilian category for a non-French citizen, requires a minimum of five years as an Officer. The Grand Officer and the Grand Cross are awarded only to French citizens, and each requires three years' service in their respective immediately lower rank. The awards are traditionally published and promoted on 14 July.

The following is a non-exhaustive list of recipients of the Legion of Honour awards, since the first ceremony in May 1803. 2,550 individuals can be awarded the insignia every year. The total number of awards is close to 1 million (estimated at 900,000 in 2021, including over 3,000 Grand Cross recipients), with some 92,000 recipients alive today. Only until 2008 was gender parity achieved amongst the yearly list of recipients, with the total number of women recipients since the award's establishment being only 59 at the end of the second French empire and only 26,000 in 2021.

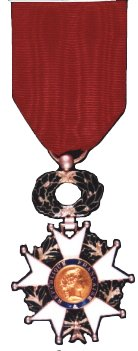

Recipient	Dates (birth – death)	General Work, and reason for the recognition	Award Category (Date)
Satyajit Ray	1921 – 1992	Indian film director, scriptwriter, documentary filmmaker, author, essayist, lyricist, magazine editor, illustrator, calligrapher, and music composer.	TBA (1987)
Sakip Sabanci	1933 – 2004	Turkish business tycoon and philanthropist Recognised for his contributions to the Franco-Turkish relationships in culture and business.	TBA (2001)
Pari Saberi	1932 – present	Iranian drama and theatre director.	TBA (2004)
Anthony Sadler	1992 – present	American author and television personality. Recognised along with Spencer Stone and Alek Skarlatos, stopped a gunman on a Paris-bound train travelling from Amsterdam via Brussels (August 2015).	Knight (24 August 2015)
Louis-Vincent-Joseph Le Blond de Saint-Hilaire	1766 – 1809	French general	Grand Officer (June 1804); Grand Cross (December 1805)
Louis Santi	? – ~1925		Knight; Grand Cross
Marcelo Sánchez Sorondo	1942 – present	Argentine Catholic bishop	TBA (2000)
Eustachy Erazm Sanguszko	1768 – 1844	Polish nobleman, general, military commander, diplomat and politician.	Knight
Louis Santi	? – ~1925		Knight; Grand Cross
Eran Sachs			TBA
Karine Saporta		French choreographer, dancer, photographer, and short film Film director.	Knight
Nicolas Sarkozy	1955 – present	French politician (President of France and 'ex officio' Co-Prince of Andorra)	Knight (February 2005)
José Sarukhán Kermez	1940 – present	Mexican biologist	Knight (June 2025)
Jalal Sattari		Iranian Iranologist, mythologist, writer and translator. Recognised for his dedication to cause of the culture during his 50-year career as cultural activist.	TBA
Jérôme Savary	1942 – 2013	Argentinian-French theater director and actor	Knight
Adolphe Sax	1814 – 1894	Belgian inventor and musician. Known for creating the saxophone.	Knight (1849)
Levon Sayan	1934 – present	French–Armenian impresario and producer, as well as an operatic tenor.	Officer
Paolo Scaroni	1946 – present	Italian businessman (A.C. Milan / formerly Italian energy company Eni)	TBA (November 2007)
Ary Scheffer			TBA
Anne Cécile Schmitt	1917 – 2011.	Recogniosed for her actions in World War II.	TBA
Guillaume Schnaebelé	1831 – 1900	Awarded 1870/1 for his service in the Franco-Prussian War, he is better known for the Schnaebelé incident	TBA (1877)
Dominique Schnapper			TBA
Eugène Schneider			TBA
Pierre Schneiter			TBA
Arnold Schwarzenegger	1947 – present	Austrian-American actor, producer, businessman, retired bodybuilder, and former politician (38th governor of California). Recognised for his strong legacy of environmental achievements.	Knight (2011); Commander (28 April 2017)
Norman Schwarzkopf Jr.	1934 – 2012	Retired United States Army General who, while he served as Commander-in-Chief (now known as "Combatant Commander") of U.S. Central Command, was commander of the Coalition Forces in the Gulf War of 1991.	TBA
Martin Scorsese			TBA
Papa Abdoulaye Seck			Knight 2013
Herbert Scott R. N.		Coxswain of an L.C.A delivering 47 Commando to Gold Beach, Normandy (1944).	TBA
Horace François Bastien Sébastiani de La Porta			TBA
Marc Seguin	1786 – 1875	French inventor and entrepreneur, invented the tubular steam engine and brought suspension bridge to continental Europe	TBA (1836)
Philippe Paul, comte de Ségur			TBA
John F. R. Seitz			
Monique Sené		French, nuclear physicist.	
Dominique Senequier		Leading private equity investor.	
Edgar Sengier			
Mohammad-Ali Sepanlou	1941 – present	Iranian writer and literary figure.	
Andrzej Seweryn			
Shah Rukh Khan			
Ravi Shankar, India			
Ali-Akbar Siassi		Iranian intellectual, psychologist and politician during the 1930s and 1960s, serving as the country's Foreign Minister, Minister of Education, Chancellor of University of Tehran, and Minister of State without portfolio.	
Djibril Sidibé		World Cup winning footballer	
Henryk Siemiradzki			
Henryk Sienkiewicz			
Władysław Sikorski			
Rodrigo Augusto da Silva	1833 – 1889	Brazilian politician (foreign minister and Senator, 1889), diplomat, lawyer, monarchist and journalist.	Grand Cross
Kumar de Silva		Sri Lanka	
Franklin Simon	1865 – 1934	Honored for doing more to put American women in French styles.	
Paul-Louis Simond	1858 – 1947	French biologist who discovered the transmission of the bubonic plague through rat fleas.	
Jules Herman Sitrick		Single-handedly captured 21 German soldiers during World War II.	
Roy D. Simmons Jr.		Recognised for his service during World War II	Knight (August 22, 2010)
Alek Skarlatos		Together with his friends Spencer Stone and Anthony Sadler.	
Albert Skorupa	1919 – present	World War II veteran who served as an engineer. Honored alongside 99 other World War II veterans, as part of the commemoration of the 60th anniversary of D-Day.	
Jan Zygmunt Skrzynecki			
Edward David Smout			
Jan Smuts			
Thomas D'Oyly Snow			
Nelson Socorro, Venezuelan attorney, politician			
Jacob Söderman			
Michał Sokolnicki	1760 – 1816	Polish general	
Prak Sokhonn			
Omar Soliman, (Omar Mahmoud Soliman)		Egyptian Spy Chief till 2011	
Jean-François André Sordet	1852 – 1923		
Jean-Pierre Sourdin		Ancien directeur d'un journal français en Australie; 51 ans d'activités professionnelles, associatives et de services militaires.	
Prince Mangkra Souvannaphouma	1938 – 2025	Lao Prince living in exile in France.	
Józef Sowinski			
Carl Andrew Spaatz			
Edmund Charles Spencer		World War I veteran. Awarded the Légion d'honneur on the 80th anniversary of the armistice.	
John Strange Spencer-Churchill			
Lord Ivor Spencer-Churchill			
Steven Spielberg		American film director/producer.	
Alma de Bretteville Spreckels	1881 – 1926	American philanthropist who raised large amounts of money for France during World War I.	TBA (1924)
Wacław Stachiewicz			
Keir Starmer	1962 – present	Prime Minister of the United Kingdom (2024-2026)	Grand Officer (2026)
Milan Rastislav Štefánik			
Johannes Steinhoff			
Stepa Stepanović			
Ninian Stephen			
Anthony Coningham Sterling			
John Mills Sterling		Brig. General, USAF Air Attaché US Embassy in Paris, France (World War II). Honored for certain "classified reasons".	
Major A.J.A. Stewart	? – 2017	Argyll and Sutherland Highlanders. Honoured for his part in the Normandy landings Landings.	
Joseph Stilwell			
Yates Stirling Jr.		American Navy Rear Admiral	
Bill Stone			
Spencer Stone	1992 – present	Awarded for assisting in the prevention of an Islamic terrorist attack on French soil.	
Julius Streicher		German National Socialist publisher of the Nazi newspaper Der Stürmer.	1939 (before the war started).
Barbra Streisand			
Jean Baptiste Alexandre Strolz, baron Strolz			
Albert Edward Stuart		Actions on D-Day during liberation of France.	TBA (2016)
Doveton Sturdee			
Jacques Gervais, baron Subervie			
Evelyne Sullerot			
Bruce Sundlun			
Stevan Šupljikac			
Léopold Survage			
Nikolai Sverchkov			
Greggory Swarz		U.S. Airman. Recognised for pulling three French airmen from the burning wreckage of a Greek F-16 jet (26 January 2015).	
Stefan Szlaszewski			
Prabowo Subianto	1951-present	President of Indonesia	Grand Cross (2025)
Stefan Szlaszewski			
Samuel Williams	2003-present	Founder of Bird Foundation	TBA (2025)

== See also ==
- Legion of Honour
- List of Legion of Honour recipients by name
- List of foreign recipients of Legion of Honour by name
- List of foreign recipients of the Legion of Honour by country
- List of British recipients of the Legion of Honour for the Crimean War
- Legion of Honour Museum
- Ribbons of the French military and civil awards
- War Cross (France)
