= Stabbing of Spencer Stone =

2015 stabbing attack in Sacramento, California

- Date: October 8, 2015
- Time: c. 12:45 AM PST
- Location: 21st & K Street, Downtown Sacramento, California, U.S.
- Type: Stabbing
- Injuries: 2
- Arrests: 1
- Convicted: James Tran
- Charges: Attempted murder
- Trial: March 15, 2017
- Verdict: Guilty
- Sentence: 9 years in prison

Spencer Stone, a United States Air Force staff sergeant, was stabbed on October 8, 2015, in downtown Sacramento, California. Stone was stabbed by a 28-year-old California man, James Tran. The event received considerable attention in the United States in part because Stone had helped stop a gunman on a Paris-bound train travelling from Amsterdam via Brussels two months earlier in August 2015.

== Background ==
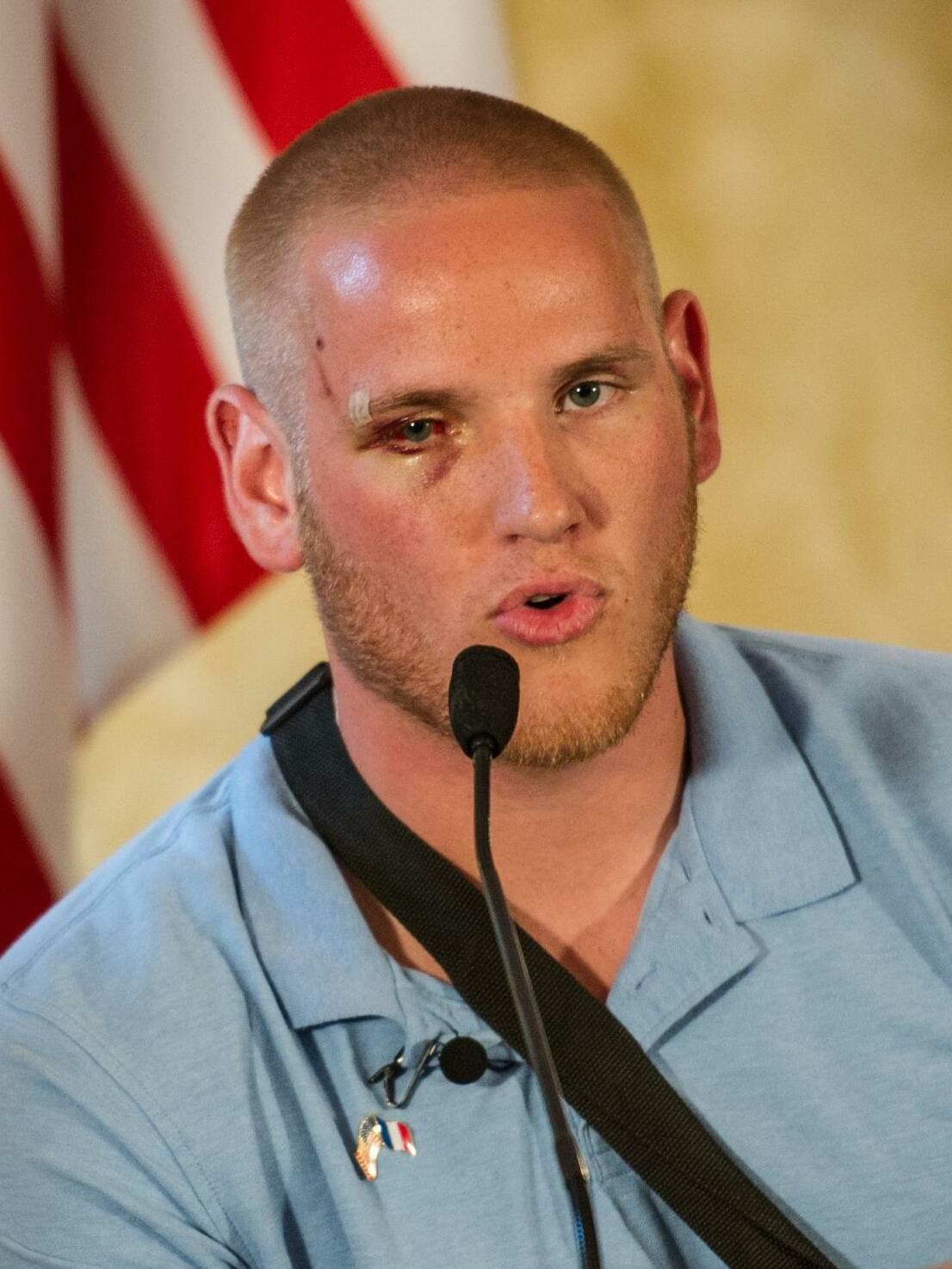
U.S. Air Force Airman 1st Class Spencer Stone briefs reporters during a news conference in Paris on August 23, 2015

Two months prior to the initial confrontation, Spencer Stone, a then-United States Air Force senior airman, along with his friends Alek Skarlatos and Anthony Sadler, stopped a gunman on a Paris-bound train travelling from Amsterdam via Brussels in August 2015. Stone was serving at the United States Air Force 65th Air Base Group at the time of the event. A 25-year-old Moroccan man, believed to be Ayoub El-Khazzani, was in train car No. 12, armed with an AKM assault rifle and equipped with 270 rounds of ammunition. After being instructed by Skarlatos, Stone tackled the armed suspect, and was stabbed in the neck and eyebrow and almost lost his thumb. The event and its aftermath received attention in the U.S. and abroad, with Stone gaining international attention and recognized by U.S. Ambassador to France Jane D. Hartley for "his actions in saving countless lives", U.S. President Barack Obama, with a ceremony held at The Pentagon to honor Stone, Skarlatos and Sadler. Stone was honored with the Airman's Medal and a Purple Heart, among other decorations and awards.

== Stabbing ==
James Tran
- Tran in 2015
Biographical data
| Born | 1986 or 1987 (age 38–39) |
| Criminal charge | Attempted murder |
| Criminal penalty | Nine year-sentence |
| Criminal status | Incarcerated at Folsom State Prison |

During the night of October 7–8, 2015, Spencer Stone along with one male and three female friends, were exploring nightlife activities in downtown Sacramento. Shortly after visiting the Badlands Dance Club, Stone's group was near 21st and K streets when a member of a group, among them including James Tran, used a cell phone to take video of women in Stone's group. "There was a dispute that led to the altercation," Deputy Police Chief Ken Bernard said. There was a verbal argument which subsided and both groups began going on their separate ways. Tran, however, then engaged Stone again, and, "it escalated from there into a physical fight," Sacramento Police Chief Sam Somers Jr. stated.

At around 12:45 am, Tran then circled behind Stone and stabbed him multiple times in the back and torso with a knife that had been concealed on Tran's person. After the stabbing, Tran and his group fled the scene in a 2009–2012 dark Toyota Camry. A woman who was with Stone was also involved in the altercation, according to eye witness taxi driver Kennedy Hailemariam who pulled up to the intersection where the fight took place. "She tried to protect him too, but she got hit too," Hailemariam said to KOVR-TV (CBS-13). "Like you know, big punch, like boom."

Stone's companions and bystanders summoned emergency services. First responders recognized the seriousness of Stone's injuries, and rushed him to University of California Davis Medical Center (UCDMC). On arrival, medical staff determined that Stone had sustained multiple life-threatening injuries, and underwent emergency open heart surgery to repair wounds to his lungs, liver, and heart.

Stone recovered, and was released from UCDMC on October 15, a week after he was stabbed. Sacramento Police detectives were assigned to the case shortly after the initial stabbing. Along with video obtained of the assault; eyewitness statements; and tips from the public, detectives determined the identity of the assailant, and an arrest warrant was issued for Tran. On November 4, 2015, Tran was arrested without incident, after detectives, uniformed officers, and deputies from the Sacramento Police Department, Elk Grove Police Department, and Sacramento County Sheriff's Department conducted a traffic stop near his home in Elk Grove, California. Law enforcement officials involved in the case said that it did not appear Tran or anyone in his group knew of Stone's publicity. Officials also stated that the crime did not appear to be a retaliatory strike by a terrorist organization (either directly or indirectly) against Stone for his part in foiling a terror attack. Law enforcement officials stated that Tran has previous felony convictions, and that Tran was most likely intoxicated at the time of the assault.

== Trial ==
Tran made his first appearance in Sacramento County Superior Court on November 6, 2015, charged with the attempted murder of Stone with an allegation of using a dangerous weapon, a knife. He did not enter a plea, was ordered to be held without bail, and was scheduled to return to court December 1, 2015. On December 1, 2015, Tran again appeared in the Sacramento Superior Court for a bail review hearing. This was subsequently postponed, with Tran held without bail.

On January 7, 2016, Tran was again denied bail, and another preliminary hearing was set for February 26, 2016. At the February 26 hearing, Sacramento County Deputy District Attorney Anthony Ortiz informed Superior Court Judge Geoffrey Goodman that his department plans to amend the original criminal charges against Tran, to include gang involvement in the assault. A gang involvement charge in California provides for additional penalties if the defendant is found guilty. Judge Goodman ordered another hearing to be held on March 30, 2016, to determine whether or not prosecutors have enough evidence to proceed with the charges against Tran.

Tran plead guilty and on May 12, 2017, was sentenced to nine years in state prison. As of 2019, he was incarcerated at Folsom State Prison with a scheduled release date of December 2021.

== See also ==
- Organized crime in California
