= Guys Choice: Perfect 10 =

- Date: Sunday, Jun 9, 2016
- Location: Sony Pictures Studios, Culver City, California
- Country: United States

Television/radio coverage
- Network: Spike

The Guys Choice: Perfect 10, also known as 2016 Guys Choice, is an awards show that was taped on June 4 at the Sony Pictures Studios in Culver City, California and aired on Spike on June 9, 2016. This year's theme was set to a 'Rat Pack' Las Vegas theme in honor of the show's 10th anniversary. A last minute tribute to Muhammad Ali, who died the day before the taping on June 3, was included with a special performance from John Legend and Andra Day.

== Performers ==
- Robin Thicke – "Give It 2 U"^{a}
- John Legend & Andra Day – "Greatest Love of All"

a Performed the song with Black Daddy before Gigi Hadid accepted Our New Girlfriend.

=== House artist ===
Black Daddy

== Presenters ==
- Chrissy Teigen – welcomed the audience to the show
- Kendrick Lamar – presented Athlete of the Decade
- Rob Riggle – presented Our New Girlfriend
- Norman Reedus – presented Outlaw
- Adam DeVine and Zac Efron – presented Hot & Funny
- Zac Efron – presented Guy Movie Hall of Fame
- RZA – presented Unstoppable Jock
- Dermot Mulroney and Matt Bomer – presented Woman of the Decade
- John Legend – presented the Muhammad Ali tribute and performance
- Sarah Hyland – presented Comedy MVP
- Clint Eastwood – presented Hero
- Terry Crews – presented Jean-Claude Gahd Dam
- Christian Slater – presented Virtuoso
- Robert De Niro – presented Guys of the Decade

== Honorees ==
=== Athlete of the Decade ===
- Kobe Bryant

=== Our New Girlfriend ===
- Gigi Hadid

=== Outlaw ===
- Kiefer Sutherland

=== Hot & Funny ===
- Anna Kendrick

=== Guy Movie Hall of Fame ===
- Casino

=== Unstoppable Jock ===
- Von Miller

=== Woman of the Decade ===
- Julia Roberts

=== Comedy MVP ===
- Adam DeVine

=== Hero ===
- Alek Skarlatos, Anthony Sadler and Spencer Stone

=== Jean-Claude Gahd Dam ===
- Olivia Munn

=== Virtuoso ===
- James Franco

=== Guys of the Decade ===
- Ben Affleck & Matt Damon
