= The 15:17 to Paris (book) =

2016 book

The 15:17 to Paris: The True Story of a Terrorist, a Train and Three American Heroes
- Author: Anthony Sadler; Alek Skarlatos; Jeffrey E. Stern; Spencer Stone
- Language: English
- Genre: memoir
- Published: 2016
- Publisher: PublicAffairs
- Publication place: United States
- ISBN: 978-1610397339

The 15:17 to Paris: The True Story of a Terrorist, a Train and Three American Heroes is a 2016 book by Anthony Sadler, Alek Skarlatos and Spencer Stone, written with journalist Jeffrey E. Stern. The book recounts the authors' actions during the 2015 Thalys train attack, in which they subdued an armed attacker and prevented a terrorist attack aboard a high-speed train. It combines autobiographical material of their lives with a detailed account of the incident and its aftermath, emphasizing the friendship between the three men and the circumstances that led them to act. Their book was adapted into a 2018 film directed by Clint Eastwood.

== Background ==
On August 21, 2015, a heavily armed gunman–later identified as Ayoub El Khazzani–attempted a terrorist attack on a Thalys train traveling from Amsterdam to Paris. Americans Anthony Sadler, a college student; Alek Skarlatos, an Oregon Army National Guard member; and Spencer Stone, a United States Air Force member, were friends who were traveling in Europe at the time and intervened to subdue the attacker, preventing mass casualties. Their actions were widely reported in international media, and they received recognition for their bravery.

== Publication and content ==
On January 20, 2016, Perseus Books Group announced plans to publish a book centered on the three men and their accounts of the attack, to be released on its first anniversary, after acquiring the rights to their story. The book was published on August 23, 2016. The book begins by describing the early lives and friendship of Skarlatos and Stone, who were raised by their mothers, and their subsequent friendship with Sadler at the Christian middle school they all attended. After high school, Skarlatos and Stone enlisted in the armed forces, while Sadler attended California State University, Sacramento, causing the three friends to drift apart. They later agree to meet in Europe for a vacation. Later sections of the book focus on the life of Ayoub El-Khazzani, the perpetrator of the attack, the unfolding events on the train, and the role of the three friends in subduing him. The three men later portrayed themselves in a 2018 film based on their book directed by Clint Eastwood.

== Works cited ==
- Sadler, Anthony; Skarlatos, Alek; Stone, Spencer; Stern, Jeffrey E (2016). The 15:17 to Paris: The True Story of a Terrorist, a Train, and Three American Heroes. New York: PublicAffairs. ISBN 978-1610397339.
