= Award for Valor =

Award for Valor may refer to one of the following awards of the United States Government:

- State Department Award for Valor
- Secretary of the Army Award for Valor
- Secretary of Defense Medal for Valor
