= The 15:17 to Paris =

2018 American biographical drama film

- Theatrical release poster
- Directed by: Clint Eastwood
- Screenplay by: Dorothy Blyskal
- Based on: The 15:17 to Paris: The True Story of a Terrorist, a Train, and Three American Heroes by Jeffrey E. Stern; Spencer Stone; Anthony Sadler; Alek Skarlatos
- Produced by: Clint Eastwood; Jessica Meier; Tim Moore; Kristina Rivera
- Starring: Anthony Sadler; Alek Skarlatos; Spencer Stone; Judy Greer; Jenna Fischer; William Jennings; Bryce Gheisar; Paul-Mikel Williams; Thomas Lennon; P. J. Byrne; Tony Hale
- Cinematography: Tom Stern
- Edited by: Blu Murray
- Music by: Christian Jacob
- Production companies: Warner Bros. Pictures; Village Roadshow Pictures; Malpaso Productions
- Distributed by: Warner Bros. Pictures
- Release date: February 9, 2018 (United States)
- Running time: 94 minutes
- Country: United States
- Language: English
- Budget: $30 million
- Box office: $57.1 million

The 15:17 to Paris is a 2018 American biographical drama film produced and directed by Clint Eastwood and written by Dorothy Blyskal, based on the 2016 autobiography The 15:17 to Paris: The True Story of a Terrorist, a Train, and Three American Heroes by Jeffrey E. Stern, Spencer Stone, Anthony Sadler, and Alek Skarlatos. The film stars Stone, Sadler, and Skarlatos as themselves and follows the trio through life leading up to and including their stopping of the 2015 Thalys train attack. Judy Greer and Jenna Fischer also star.

Eastwood's intention to adapt the autobiography into a film was announced in April 2017, from a screenplay by Blyskal, a first-time screenwriter. Though professional actors such as Kyle Gallner and Jeremie Harris were considered, Eastwood decided by July to instead cast the real-life participants of the event, and filming began in the same month.

The 15:17 to Paris was released in the United States on February 9, 2018, by Warner Bros. Pictures. The film received mixed-to-negative reviews from critics, and underperformed at the box office, grossing $57.1 million worldwide on a $30 million budget.

== Plot ==
While attending a suburban Christian middle school, Spencer Stone and Alek Skarlatos formed a bond over their interest in militaria, but were frequently in trouble with teachers and the school principal. On one visit to the principal's office, the two met another student being disciplined, Anthony Sadler, and they all became friends. Spencer and Alek were raised by single mothers, who defended their sons when they were called to the principal's office to discuss their misconduct in school.

As an adult, Spencer met a recruiter for the United States Marine Corps, who piqued his interest in joining the Air Force pararescue. After several months of rigorous training and exercise, he got into better shape and enlisted in the Air Force, where he completed basic training and sat exams for pararescue school, but was turned down for having poor depth perception. Spencer then chose from the remaining Air Force options left to him and was stationed abroad. Meanwhile, Alek enlisted in the National Guard and was deployed to Afghanistan, where he told Spencer over Skype his plans to visit his girlfriend in Germany on his next leave.

Spencer skypes Anthony, now a college student, and persuaded him into vacationing with him in Europe. After beginning their trip in Italy, Spencer and Anthony met up with Alek in Germany, and the three decided to go to Amsterdam; after a few days there, they decide to visit France and depart from Amsterdam Centraal station on the 15:17 train to Paris. After the train departs, American-born Frenchman Mark Moogalian notices that one of the toilets has been occupied for an unusually long time. When he goes to investigate, a terrorist emerges with an assault rifle. Moogalian and another passenger attempt to subdue the terrorist but are shot, prompting passengers to try and escape the train.

The terrorist enters the next car, where Spencer, Alek and Anthony are sitting; seeing him, Spencer makes a snap decision to try and subdue the terrorist. The terrorist's weapon misfires, giving Spencer the opportunity to tackle and disarm him. Alek, Anthony and fellow passenger Chris Norman join the effort to overwhelm the terrorist, who stabs Spencer several times in the back. Despite this, Spencer is able to knock him out by putting him in a choke hold. Armed police enter the train at the next station, apprehending then subduing the terrorist while paramedics begin to treat Spencer's wounds and those of Moogalian, who is rushed to the emergency room at a local hospital and survives. Spencer, Alek, Anthony and Chris Norman are honored by President of France François Hollande, who acknowledges their bravery and awards them the French Legion of Honour in recognition of their act of courage. The three return to their hometown of Sacramento, where a parade is held in their honor.

== Cast ==
- Spencer Stone as himself
- Anthony Sadler as himself
- Alek Skarlatos as himself
- Mark Moogalian as himself
- Isabelle Risacher Moogalian as herself
- Judy Greer as Joyce Eskel, Spencer's Mother
- Jenna Fischer as Heidi Skarlatos, Alek's Mother
- Ray Corasani as Ayoub El-Khazzani
- Chris Norman as himself
- P. J. Byrne as Mr. Henry
- Sinqua Walls as Marine
- Ethan Rains as Ben Zomerdyk
- Tony Hale as Coach Murray
- Thomas Lennon as Principal Michael Akers
- Jaleel White as Garrett Walden

Additionally, Paul-Mikel Williams, Max Ivutin, Bryce Gheisar, Cole Eichenberger, and William Jennings portray younger versions of Stone, Sadler, and Skarlatos.

== Production ==
On April 20, 2017, it was announced that Clint Eastwood would next direct The 15:17 to Paris from a screenplay by newcomer screenwriter Dorothy Blyskal based on the book The 15:17 to Paris: The True Story of a Terrorist, a Train, and Three American Heroes. It was announced that Eastwood would begin casting immediately for a principal production start date of later that year. On June 21, 2017, it was announced that Eastwood had chosen Kyle Gallner, Jeremie Harris and Alexander Ludwig to star as Alek Skarlatos, Anthony Sadler and Spencer Stone, although offers had not yet been made.

On July 11, 2017, it was announced that Eastwood had cast Sadler, Skarlatos and Stone as themselves in the film which will "begin during their childhood and show their friendship leading up to the moment that changed their lives". It was also announced that the film had commenced principal production. On July 13, 2017, Tony Hale and Thomas Lennon joined the cast as staff members of a school the lead three men attended as children. On August 1, 2017, Sinqua Walls was cast in the film for an unspecified role. Mark Moogalian and Isabelle Risacher Moogalian were also cast as themselves in the film. Eastwood finished shooting in Atlanta, Georgia on August 2, 2017.

The film's release date of February 9, 2018 was announced by Warner Bros. on October 24, 2017.

== Release ==
The film was released in the United States on February 9, 2018. The film was originally rated R by the MPAA for "a sequence of violence and bloody images", but received a PG-13 rating upon appeal.

=== Marketing ===
The trailer for the film was released on December 13, 2017, two months before the film's general release.

=== Home media ===
The 15:17 to Paris was released on HD digital copies on May 1, 2018. The film was then released on Blu-ray and DVD on May 22, 2018.

== Reception ==
=== Box office ===
The 15:17 to Paris grossed $36.3 million in the United States and Canada, and $20.6 million in other territories, for a worldwide total of $56.9 million, against a production budget of $30 million.

In the United States and Canada, the film was released alongside Peter Rabbit and Fifty Shades Freed, and was projected to gross $10–15 million from 3,042 theaters in its opening weekend. It ended up making $12.6 million, finishing third at the box office behind its two fellow releases. The film dropped 40% in its second weekend to $7.6 million ($8.9 million over the four-day Presidents Day weekend), finishing fifth.

=== Critical response ===
On review aggregator Rotten Tomatoes, the film has an approval rating of 24% based on 167 reviews, and an average rating of 4.3/10. The website's critical consensus reads, "The 15:17 to Paris pays clumsily well-intentioned tribute to an act of heroism, but by casting the real-life individuals involved, director Clint Eastwood fatally derails his own efforts." On Metacritic, the film has a weighted average score of 45 out of 100, based on 36 critics, indicating "mixed or average reviews". Audiences polled by CinemaScore gave the film an average grade of "B−" on an A+ to F scale.

Kevin P. Sullivan of Entertainment Weekly gave the film a grade of D, praising the train attack scene as "thrillingly shot and edited" while criticizing the entire lead-up to it as filler. Sullivan emphasized that "The entire script is replete with [clunky and unsubtle] dialogue... doing no favors for the inexperienced actors." Matt Zoller Seitz of RogerEbert.com gave the film two out of four stars, stating that "[a] good 70% of [The 15:17 to Paris] is inert, its affable nothingness redeemed only by the laid-back charisma of three men", although he praised the film's "poker-faced sincerity" and the "superb" climactic train scene. A. O. Scott of The New York Times gave the film a positive review and wrote, "[Eastwood's] workmanlike absorption in the task at hand is precisely what makes this movie fascinating as well as moving. Its radical plainness is tinged with mystery."

=== Accolades ===
The 15:17 to Paris was nominated for Best Drama TV Spot (for a Feature Film) at the 2018 Golden Trailer Awards. At the Houston Film Critics Society Awards 2018, it received a nomination for Best Worst Film.
