= Anthony Sadler =

American author (born 1992)

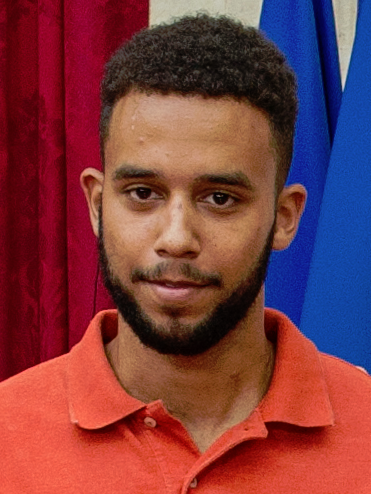
- Sadler in 2015
- Born: Anthony Albert Sadler Jr. July 13, 1992 (age 34); Contra Costa County, California, U.S.
- Citizenship: United States (1992–present); France (2018–present)
- Education: California State University, Sacramento (BS)
- Occupation: Television personality
- Years active: 2015–present
- Known for: Stopping a gunman on a Paris-bound train travelling from Amsterdam via Brussels in August 2015

Anthony Albert Sadler Jr. (born July 13, 1992) is an American author and television personality. Sadler, along with his friends Alek Skarlatos and Spencer Stone and several other passengers stopped a gunman on a Paris-bound train travelling from Amsterdam via Brussels in August 2015, gaining international recognition for their role in the event. Recognized by then-U.S. President Barack Obama and French President François Hollande, Sadler received several awards and decorations for his actions. He, along with his friends, was awarded the Legion of Honour by the French president which is the highest French order for military and civil merits.

After the event, Sadler made several television appearances, including a guest appearance on The Tonight Show Starring Jimmy Fallon and honored with the 2016 Spike Guys Choice Award on Spike TV, among other appearances. He, Skarlatos and Stone co-authored a memoir, titled The 15:17 to Paris, published in August 2016, which detailed the events leading up to the attack, which occurred a year prior to the release of the book. Clint Eastwood directed a biographical film with the same title based on Sadler, Skarlatos and Stone's memoir, starring them, along with actresses Jenna Fischer and Judy Greer. The film was released in early 2018 by Warner Bros. Pictures. Sadler graduated from California State University, Sacramento in 2017, where he was a member of the Kappa Sigma Fraternity.

== 2015 Thalys train attack ==
On August 21, 2015, Sadler and his childhood friends Alek Skarlatos and Spencer Stone, were traveling together during a sightseeing vacation in Europe when they boarded Thalys train 9364 from Amsterdam bound to Paris via Brussels. A 25-year-old Moroccan man, believed to be Ayoub El-Khazzani, was in train car No. 12, armed with an AKM assault rifle and equipped with 270 rounds of ammunition. Another passenger tackled the gunman, but failed to stop him. Sadler reported that they heard a gunshot and breaking glass behind them, seeing an employee sprint down the aisle followed by a man with an automatic rifle. Stone woke up from the breaking glass. He tackled the armed suspect, and was stabbed in the neck and eyebrow and almost lost his thumb. Skarlatos took action and seized the assailant's rifle, beating him in the head with the muzzle of it until he was unconscious. Skarlatos stated that "I was thinking about survival," and "[i]t was to survive and for everybody else on the train to make it." Sadler and British man Chris Norman helped to subdue the gunman. Sadler stated that "He was just telling us to give back his gun... But we just carried on beating him up and immobilised him and that was it."

=== International recognition ===
Sadler, in an interview, talks about his experience in the aftermath of the 2015 Thalys train attack

After the event, Sadler, Skarlatos and Stone received international attention for their actions in preventing the attack. French president François Hollande awarded Sadler, his friends Alek Skarlatos and Spencer Stone, as well as a British businessman and a French lecturer, France's highest decoration, Knights of the Legion of Honour (Chevaliers de la Légion d'honneur). Hollande said the men "faced [off] with terror" and that they "gave us a lesson in courage, in will, and therefore in hope". French Interior Minister Bernard Cazeneuve praised them for their bravery, as well as then-British Prime Minister David Cameron.

The White House expressed gratitude for "courage and quick thinking of several passengers, including U.S. service members, who selflessly subdued the attacker..." U.S. President Barack Obama telephoned the three Americans, thanking them for their heroic actions. General Philip M. Breedlove of the U.S. European Command in Stuttgart, added his voice, calling the three Americans heroes for their actions which "clearly illustrate the courage and commitment our young men and women have all the time, whether they are on duty or on leave."

Kevin Johnson, mayor of Sacramento, California, held a parade to honor Skarlatos, Sadler, Stone, and the victims of the September 11 attacks. Stone was awarded a United States Air Force Airman's Medal and a Purple Heart at a ceremony held at The Pentagon; Sadler was awarded the Secretary of Defense Medal for Valor.

According to a decree published on September 20, 2018, Sadler (along with Stone and Skarlatos) were naturalized as citizens of France, and according to Le Monde retroactively to April 2018, when they applied for nationality.

== Career and public image ==
Shortly after the foiling of the 2015 Thalys train attack earlier that year, Sadler made an appearance on The Tonight Show Starring Jimmy Fallon with host Jimmy Fallon in September 2015, discussing his role in disarming the gunman. Months later in 2016, Sadler, Alek Skarlatos and Spencer Stone started working on a memoir, titled The 15:17 to Paris, detailing the events of the train attack. Perseus Books Group, which published the book, described the memoir as "the gripping true story of a terrorist attack that would have killed more than 500 people if not for their actions, but it is also the story of three American boys, their friendship, and the values we hold dear." David Steinberger, president and chief executive of Perseus Books Group, said that he was "confident that this is going to be a film. It's extremely cinematic, and there's a lot of interest in the movie." He further stated, "based on the material, that this was going to be an important book and one that readers were really going to respond to." The memoir was made available to the public on August 23, 2016, almost a year after the 2015 Thalys train attack. Sadler made an appearance on Who Wants to Be a Millionaire in October 2016 as a part of a special "Hometown Heroes" week. Playing as a team with Skarlatos and Stone, they won $250,000. In July 2017, it was announced that Clint Eastwood would direct the upcoming biographical film titled after Stone, Skarlatos and Sadler's memoir, starring the three authors as themselves, along with actresses Jenna Fischer and Judy Greer. Filming began on July 11, 2017, and the film was released on February 9, 2018. When asked about casting the trio as themselves in the film, Eastwood stated that he was considering casting actors, "But I kept looking at the faces of these young men...it just struck me that it would be an interesting experiment." The film received a generally negative reception from critics, who were largely critical of the acting by the three leads.

On December 10, 2021, CBS announced that he along with Spencer Stone would compete on the 33rd season of The Amazing Race. They completed three legs of the race before filming was shut down on February 28, 2020, due to the COVID-19 pandemic. When production resumed 19 months later in September 2021, Sadler and Stone, along with three other teams from their season, were unable to return to the race due to extenuating circumstances; in their case, a recent promotion at Sadler's work left him unable to take the required time off for filming.

== Bibliography ==
- The 15:17 To Paris (2016) (ISBN 978-1610397339)

== Filmography ==
Year	Title	Role	Notes
2016	Who Wants to Be a Millionaire	Himself	Contestant; paired with Spencer Stone and Alek Skarlatos
2018	The 15:17 to Paris	Himself	Film based on the trio's memoir of the same title; filming began July 11, 2017
2022	The Amazing Race	Himself	Contestant; paired with Spencer Stone

== Awards and decorations ==
=== Awards ===
Year	Award Ceremony	Category	Result	Ref
2016	Spike Guys Choice Awards	Hero	Won	

=== Decorations ===
Ribbon	Decoration
	Secretary of Defense Medal for Valor
	Legion of Honour, Knight (France)
	Civic Medal for bravery, 1st Class (Belgium)
