= Alek Skarlatos =

American politician (born 1992)

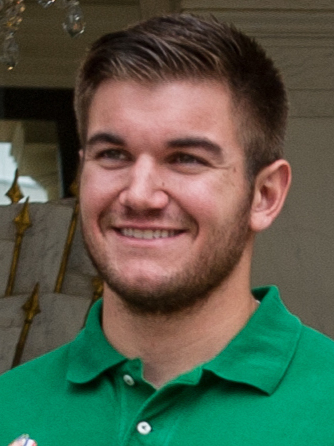
- Skarlatos in 2015

Deputy Minority Leader of the Oregon House of Representatives
- Incumbent
- Assumed office October 1, 2025
- Preceded by: Lucetta Elmer

Member of the Oregon House of Representatives from the 4th district
- Incumbent
- Assumed office January 13, 2025
- Preceded by: Christine Goodwin

Personal details
- Born: Aleksander Reed Skarlatos; October 10, 1992 (age 34) Castro Valley, California, U.S.
- Citizenship: United States; France (since 2018)
- Party: Republican
- Education: Umpqua Community College
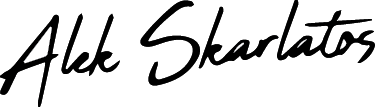
- Signature
- Website: Legislative website

Military service
- Allegiance: United States
- Branch/service: United States Army
- Years of service: 2012–2017
- Rank: Specialist
- Unit: Oregon Army National Guard
- Battles/wars: War in Afghanistan
- Awards: § Awards and decorations

Aleksander Reed Skarlatos (/skɑːrˈlɑːtoʊs/; born October 10, 1992) is an American politician and former Oregon Army National Guard soldier. He is a member of the Oregon House of Representatives, representing Oregon's 4th House district, and since October 1, 2025, has served as deputy minority leader of the House. Prior to being elected, he came to prominence for his actions during the 2015 Thalys train attack.

Skarlatos ran for political office four times. Having previously ran for Douglas County commissioner in 2018, he was the Republican nominee for Oregon's 4th congressional district in the 2020 United States House of Representatives elections but was defeated by incumbent Democrat Peter DeFazio. He again ran to represent Oregon in the 4th congressional district in the 2022 House elections, but was defeated by Democratic state labor commissioner Val Hoyle. Skarlatos ran again to represent Oregon's 4th House district in the 2024 Oregon House of Representatives election and won the November general election. He assumed office on January 13, 2025.

== Early life and military career ==
Aleksander Reed Skarlatos was born in Castro Valley, California. His father, Emanuel Skarlatos, was born in Germany to a Greek father from either Thessaloniki or Kavala and later immigrated to the United States in 1955. Skarlatos' paternal grandfather was a Greek resistance fighter in World War II and was captured by the Nazis and put into a concentration camp in East Germany before being forced to work in a boot factory. He was raised in Sacramento County, where he first met Spencer Stone and Anthony Sadler while attending a parochial school in Fair Oaks. Skarlatos moved to Oregon and graduated from Roseburg High School and attended Umpqua Community College. Skarlatos joined the Oregon Army National Guard in 2012. He was deployed for nine months in Afghanistan in the 186th Infantry Regiment and 41st Infantry Brigade Combat Team in 2015. The acting adjutant general of Oregon Guard referred to Skarlatos as "a true citizen soldier who displayed the courage each of us would hope to find in ourselves." A month prior to the terrorist event on the high-speed train in France, Skarlatos had reenlisted for an additional two years. He left military service in November 2017.

== 2015 Thalys train attack ==
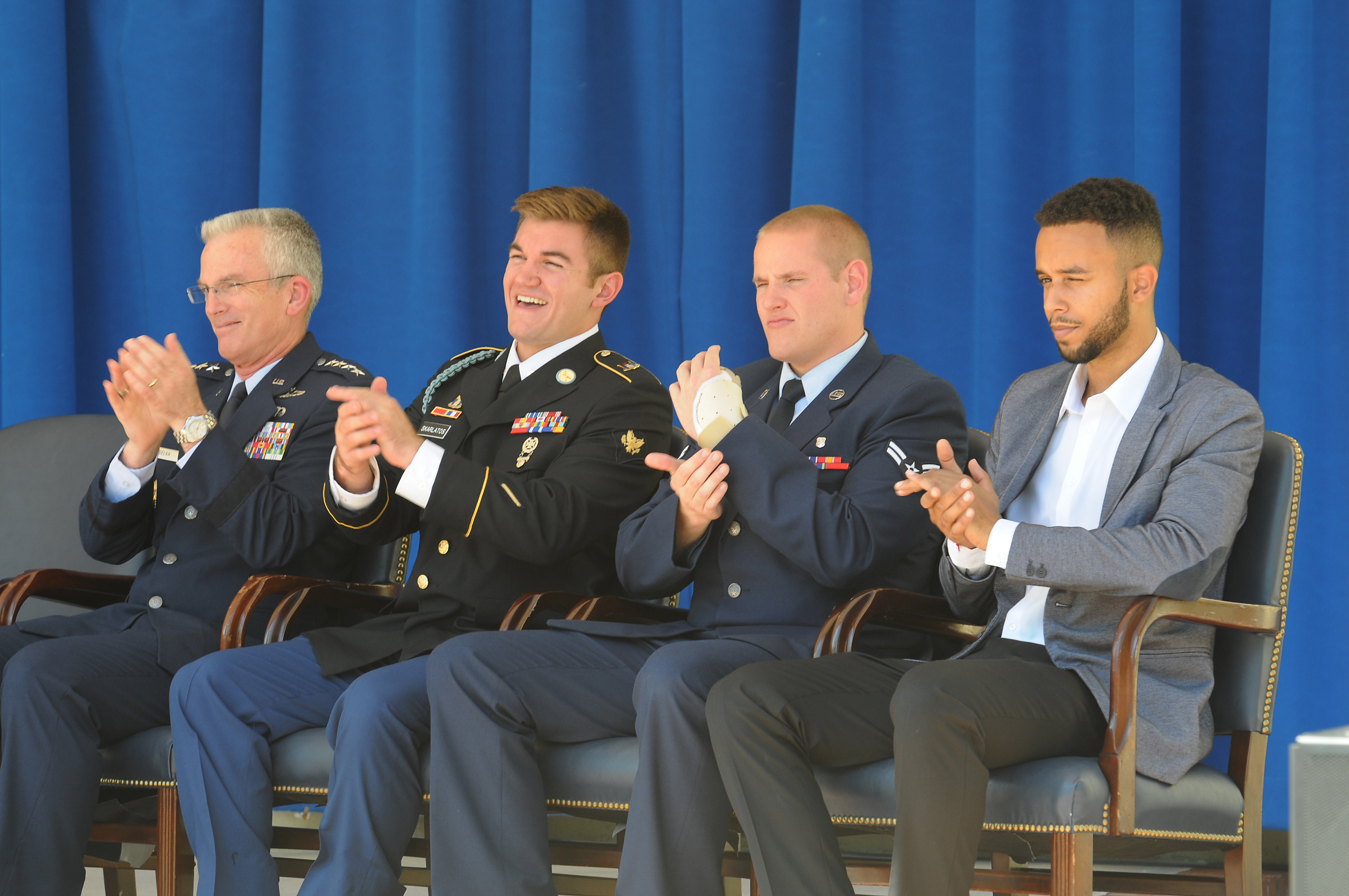
United States Defense Secretary Ash Carter awards the United States Army Soldier's Medal to Skarlatos (second from left), the United States Air Force Airman's Medal to Spencer Stone (third from left), and the United States Department of Defense Medal for Valor to Sadler (fourth from left), at a ceremony in The Pentagon courtyard on September 17, 2015.

On August 21, 2015, Skarlatos, Sadler, and Stone were traveling together on the Thalys high-speed train 9364 from Amsterdam bound for Paris via Brussels during a European vacation. Skarlatos was returning from serving in Afghanistan. A 25-year-old Moroccan, Ayoub El-Khazzani, exited the train car's toilet, armed with an AKM assault rifle, a Luger pistol, and a box knife. He carried magazines holding 270 rounds of ammunition for the assault rifle in a rucksack.

Two passengers, a Frenchman, "Damien A.," and 51-year-old Mark Moogalian, an American expatriate living in Paris, tried to disarm the gunman. Moogalian wrested the rifle from him but was shot with the Luger while trying to protect his wife. Stone ran toward and attacked the gunman but was slashed while trying to subdue him. Arriving next to the struggle, Skarlatos grabbed the pistol out of El-Khazzani's hand, then picked up the rifle, striking the terrorist in the head with its muzzle. Sixty-two-year-old British businessman Chris Norman also helped subdue the gunman. Though badly cut, Stone - who received wrestling training in the Air Force - choked El-Khazzani until he was unconscious. El-Khazzani was tied up and then Stone, who also had some military medical training, delivered lifesaving assistance to Moogalian by compressing an exposed, bleeding artery.

El-Khazzani and three of his alleged accomplices were tried in November 2020. Moogalian, Stone, Sadler, and Skarlatos were scheduled to testify, but Stone's testimony was delayed because he was hospitalized in France for undisclosed reasons. Skarlatos gave prime credit for preventing what could have been a mass killing to Stone, saying, "I do not feel like a hero because we were just doing what we had to to survive. I think Spencer is probably a hero because he was the first one" to take down El-Khazzani. "We only got involved because Spencer needed our help." El Khazzani was sentenced to life in prison for attempted murders and conspiracy to commit an act of terrorism. His accomplices were found guilty as well: Bilal Chatra was sentenced to 27 years in prison; Rédouane El Amrani Ezzerrifi was sentenced to seven years, and Mohamed Bakkali was sentenced to 25 years. Abdelhamid Abaaoud planned the attack, as well as an attack in Brussels that killed 31 people, and a series of attacks in November 2015 that killed 130 in Paris. Abaaoud was killed during a police raid of his hideout in Saint-Denis a few days later.

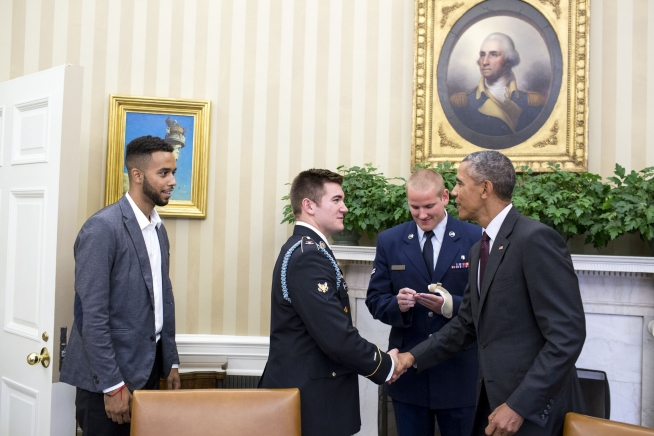
Skarlatos, along with Anthony Sadler and Spencer Stone, meet with President Barack Obama after the 2015 Thalys train attack.

=== International recognition ===
After the events of August 22, 2015, Skarlatos and his friends received international attention for their actions in thwarting the attack. French president François Hollande awarded Skarlatos, Stone, and Sadler, as well as Norman, France's highest decoration, Knights of the Legion of Honour (Chevaliers de la Légion d'honneur). Hollande said the men "gave us a lesson in courage, in will, and therefore in hope." French Interior Minister Bernard Cazeneuve and British Prime Minister David Cameron praised the men for their bravery.

The White House expressed gratitude for "courage and quick thinking of several passengers, including U.S. service members, who selflessly subdued the attacker..." U.S. President Barack Obama telephoned the three Americans, thanking them for their heroic actions. General Philip M. Breedlove of the U.S. European Command in Stuttgart, added his praise, calling the three Americans heroes for their actions which "clearly illustrate the courage and commitment our young men and women have all the time, whether they are on duty or on leave."

Kevin Johnson, mayor of Sacramento, California, held a parade to honor Skarlatos, Sadler, Stone, and the victims of the September 11 attacks. During interviews Skarlatos stated, "I feel so much more connected to terrorist attacks and things like that, and victims of terrorist attacks... That easily could have been us if any one of six or seven things went a different way." The three men would later release a book on the first anniversary of the thwarted attack titled The 15:17 to Paris with journalist Jeffrey E. Stern detailing their stories.

== Media career ==
In June 2016, Skarlatos made his film debut as himself in Range 15. In October 2016, it was announced that Skarlatos, Spencer Stone and Anthony Sadler would make an appearance on Who Wants to Be a Millionaire as a part of the show's special "Hometown Heroes" week which would premiere on October 31, 2016. Skarlatos was a competitor in season 21 of Dancing with the Stars. He was partnered with professional dancer Lindsay Arnold. He said that he was inspired to participate on the show by Noah Galloway, a soldier who was on the previous season of the series. Skarlatos and Arnold made it to the finals of the show and finished in third place. In July 2017, it was announced that Clint Eastwood would direct the upcoming biographical film titled after Stone, Skarlatos and Sadler's memoir, starring them, along with actresses Jenna Fischer and Judy Greer. Filming began on July 11, 2017. The film was released in the United States on February 9, 2018 and received a score of 23% on Rotten Tomatoes, a review aggregation website.

Skarlatos repeatedly “liked” photos of underage girls in bikinis on Instagram and joked about strangling women not long before beginning his political career. Interviewed on the 2018 podcast, "Drinkin' Bros," its host Ross Patterson asked him, "You ever thought if you choked someone and killed them in bed what would happen?" "Oh yeah," a laughing Skarlatos repeatedly responded. "Oh yeah." Skarlatos then referred to a 2017 Florida case in which a man argued that his girlfriend accidentally suffocated while she was performing oral sex on him, and he may have concealed her decomposing body for three days. Skarlatos said the man wasn't convicted, joking, "He got off, in more ways than one."

== Politics ==
=== Defeats ===
Skarlatos first ran for Douglas County Commissioner in his home state of Oregon in the 2018 midterm elections, but he lost to businessman Tom Kress. In 2019, Skarlatos announced that he was running as a candidate in the 2020 elections to represent Oregon's 4th congressional district in the United States House of Representatives as a Republican. Skarlatos won the Republican primary, on May 19, 2020, defeating Nelson Ijih with 86% of the vote. Skarlatos lost the general election to incumbent Democratic congressman Peter DeFazio in the 2020 November general election, finishing with 46.2% of the vote against DeFazio's 51.5%. Skarlatos outraised his opponent by about $500,000, mostly from individual donations, with DeFazio raising more PAC money.

In May 2021, Skarlatos announced that he would run again for Oregon's 4th congressional district in the 2022 United States House of Representatives elections. He was unopposed in the Republican primary. In September 2021, controversy arose after it was discovered that Skarlatos used leftover campaign funds from his 2020 congressional bid to fund his nonprofit 15:17 Trust and then used those funds for his 2022 congressional bid. He was later cleared of violating campaign finance laws by the Federal Election Commission.

After redistricting for the 2022 election, the 4th District contained a higher percentage of Democratic-leaning voters than before. DeFazio announced in late 2021 that he would retire. Oregon Labor Commissioner Val Hoyle announced that she would run for the seat and was endorsed by DeFazio. Hoyle won the May 17 Democratic primary. Skarlatos faced Hoyle in the November 8 general election but lost his election bid, 51% to 43%.

=== Oregon House of Representatives ===
Skarlatos ran in the 2024 Oregon House of Representatives election to represent Oregon's 4th House district. During the 2024 campaign Skarlatos was endorsed by the anti-abortion organization Oregon Right to Life and was described as a "strong pro-life advocate". He won the general election on November 5, 2024, and assumed office on January 13, 2025. Skarlatos, who is Greek–American, was hosted at the White House by President Donald Trump to celebrate Greek Independence Day in March 2025. He succeeded Lucetta Elmer as deputy minority leader after Elmer replaced Christine Drazan as minority leader on October 1, 2025. Skarlatos supports the possible deployment of federal forces in Portland during the ongoing 2025–2026 protests against ICE. On December 3, 2025, he announced that he would seek reelection for his seat in the 2026 Oregon House election. He won his primary election unopposed on May 19, 2026.

== Personal life ==
On September 20, 2018, a decree naturalizing Skarlatos, along with Stone and Sadler, as French citizens was published with the naturalization effective retroactive to April 2018, when the three of them applied for citizenship. A naturalization ceremony was held in Sacramento on January 31, 2019. Skarlatos was raised a Presbyterian, but is now a member of a Lutheran church.

== Awards and decorations ==

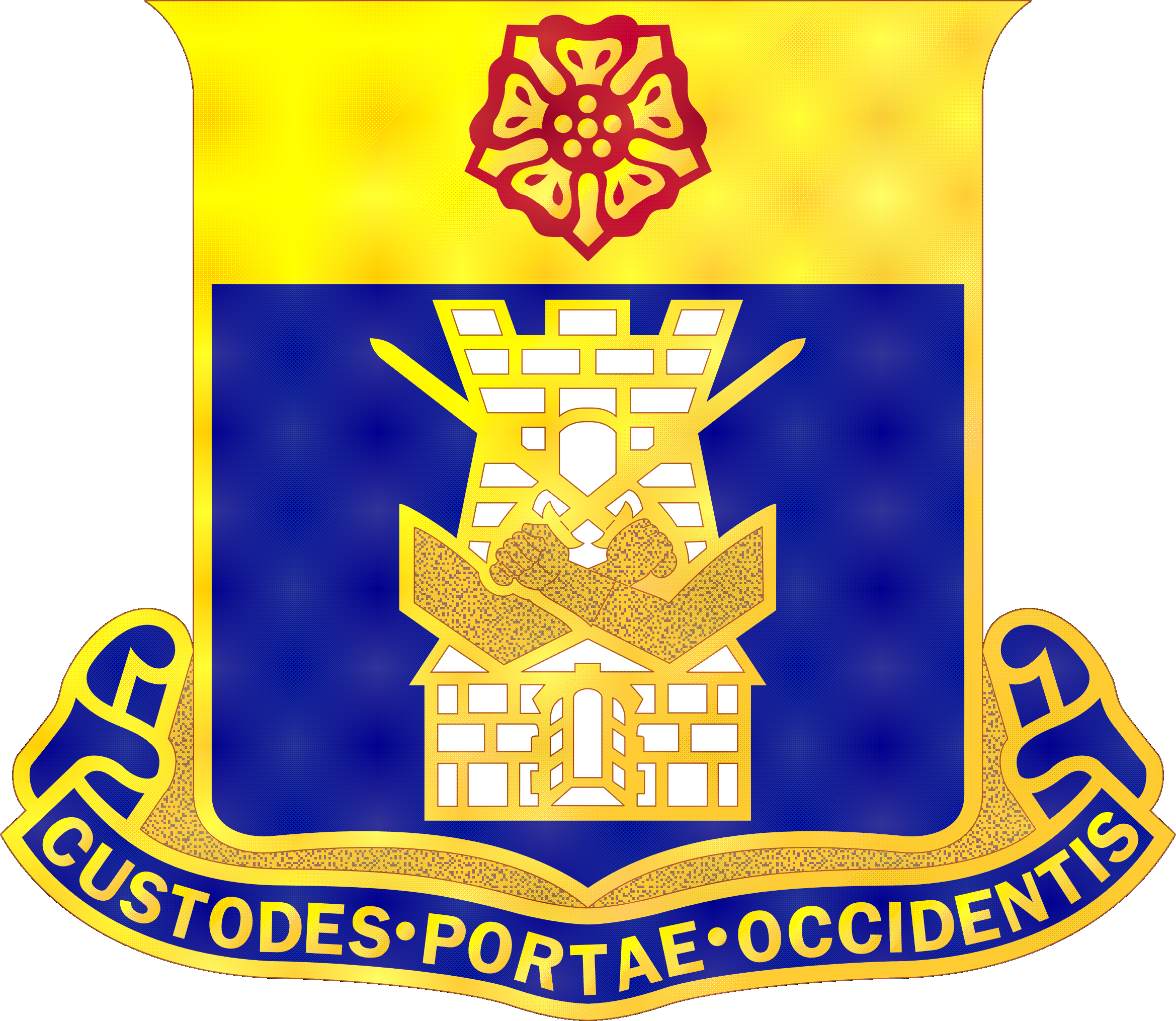

Badge	Air Assault Badge		
1st Row Awards	Soldier's Medal	Achievement Medal	Good Conduct Medal
2nd Row Awards	National Defense Service Medal	Afghanistan Campaign Medal with two bronze service stars	Global War on Terrorism Service Medal
3rd Row Awards	Armed Forces Reserve Medal with "M" device	Army Service Ribbon	Overseas Service Ribbon
4th Row Awards	Legion of Honour, Knight (France, August 2015)	NATO Medal	Oregon Distinguished Service Medal
5th Row Awards	186th Infantry Regiment Distinctive Unit Insignia		Civic Decoration

- Received the bravery medal of the city of Arras, France.

== Electoral history ==
2020 US House of Representatives, Oregon's 4th congressional district
Party	Candidate	Votes	%
Democratic	Peter DeFazio	240,950	51.5
Republican	Alek Skarlatos	216,081	46.2
Pacific Green	Daniel Hoffay	10,118	2.2
Write-in		556	0.1
Total votes		467,705	100%

2022 US House of Representatives, Oregon's 4th congressional district
Party	Candidate	Votes	%
Democratic	Val Hoyle	171,372	50.5
Republican	Alek Skarlatos	146,055	43.1
Independent	Levi Leatherberry	9,052	2.7
Constitution	Jim Howard	6,075	1.8
Pacific Green	Mike Beilstein	6,033	1.8
Write-in		490	0.1
Total votes		339,077	100%

2024 Oregon State Representative, 4th district
Party	Candidate	Votes	%
Republican	Alek Skarlatos	27,636	70.2
Democratic	Richard Chasm	11,671	29.6
Write-in		70	0.2
Total votes		39,377	100%

== Works ==
=== Bibliography ===
- The 15:17 To Paris (2016) (ISBN 978-1610397339)

=== Filmography ===
Year	Title	Role	Notes
2015	Dancing with the Stars	Himself	Competitor on season 21 with Lindsay Arnold
2016	Range 15	Himself	Veteran-based zombie film
2016	Who Wants to Be a Millionaire	Himself	Appearance with Anthony Sadler and Spencer Stone
2018	The 15:17 to Paris	Himself	Film based on his memoir

Oregon House of Representatives
Preceded by Lucetta Elmer	Deputy Minority Leader of the Oregon House of Representatives; 2025–present	Incumbent
