= 2015 Thalys train attack =

Attempted mass shooting in France

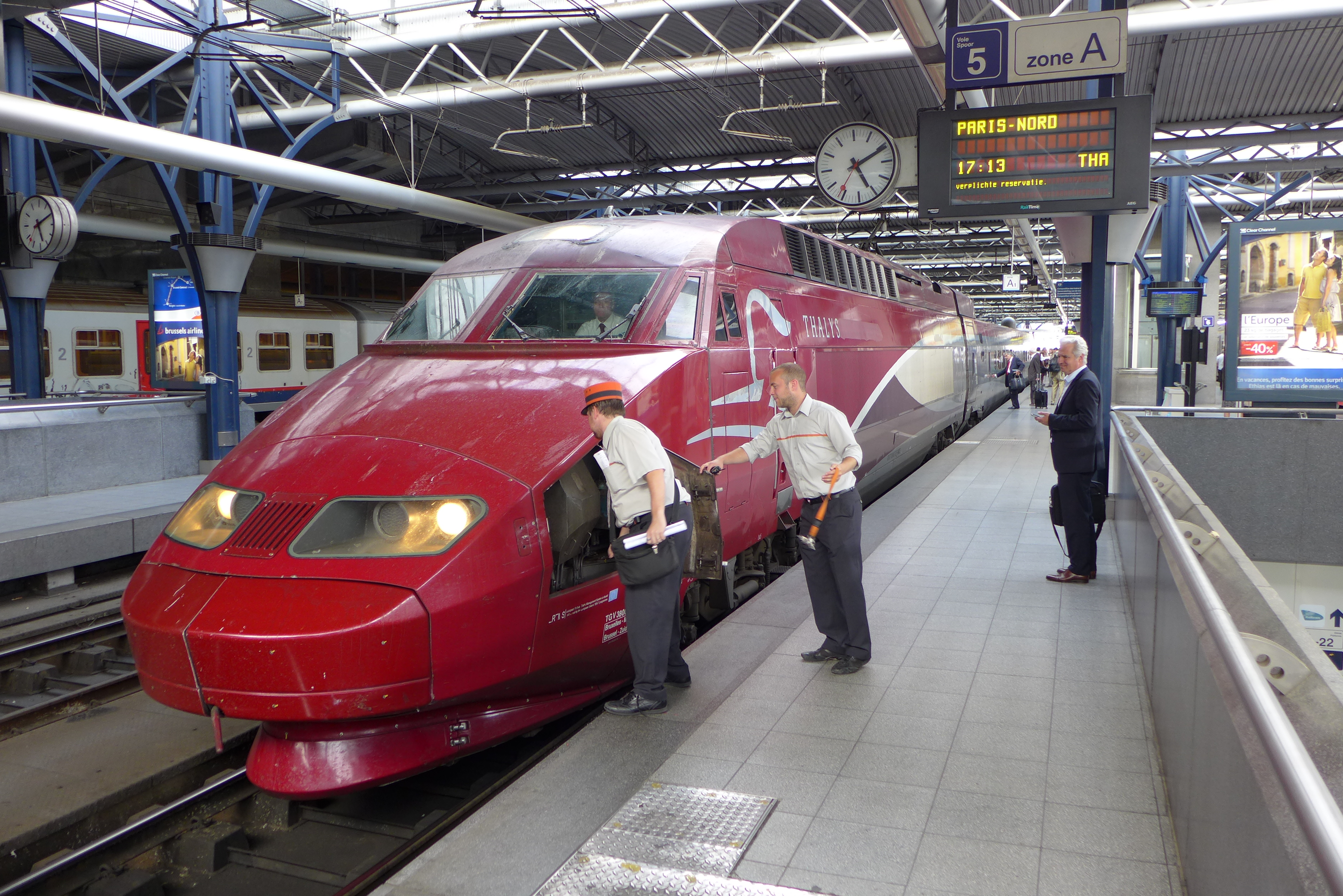
- A Thalys train operating the same route, at Brussels-South in June 2014
- Location: 50°27′57″N 2°58′26″E; On board Thalys train 9364 near Oignies, France
- Date: 21 August 2015; 17:45 (CEST)
- Attack type: Attempted terrorist attack, mass shooting, attempted arson
- Weapons: 9mm Luger M80 semi-automatic pistol; PM md. 90 short-barreled rifle; Utility knife; Bottle of gasoline
- Deaths: 0
- Injuries: 4 (3 directly, including the perpetrator) (Note: The injured were Moogalian, Stone, El Khazzani, and Anglade, whose injury was indirectly related to the incident.)
- Perpetrator: Ayoub El Khazzani
- Defenders: Damien A., Mark Moogalian, Spencer Stone, Anthony Sadler, Alek Skarlatos, and Chris Norman
- Motive: Islamic terrorism

On 21 August 2015, a shooting and knife attack took place on a Thalys train on its way from Amsterdam to Paris. The perpetrator, 25-year-old Moroccan national Ayoub El Khazzani, was confronted by French, American, and British passengers who had noticed him carrying weapons onboard. El Khazzani injured two of the passengers with gunshots and knife slashes before he was subdued. A third person was injured while breaking the glass of an emergency alarm.

For their heroism, six of the intervening passengers received the Legion of Honour, France's highest decoration. El Khazzani initially claimed to be only a robber, but later confessed that he had wanted to "kill Americans" as revenge for bombings in Syria.

== Attack ==
Map of main Thalys routes and connections

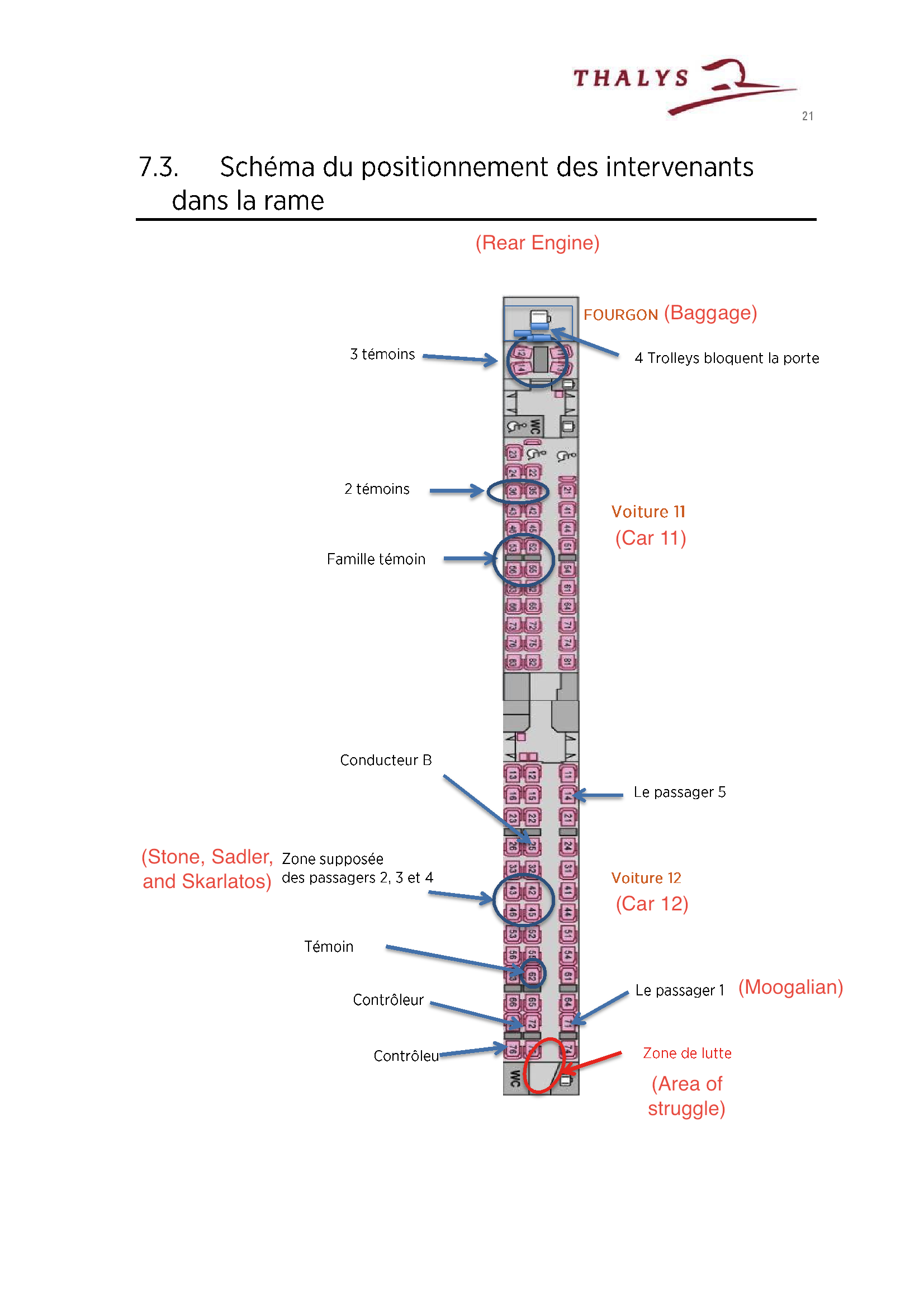
Diagram from Thalys internal report

Thalys passenger train 9364 from Amsterdam to Paris crossed the Belgian border to France at approximately 17:45 CEST on 21 August 2015. A 25-year-old Moroccan man named Ayoub El Khazzani emerged from the lavatory room of car No. 12. He was shirtless and brandishing a Draco carbine. In addition to the folding-stock carbine with a 30-round magazine, he was wearing a knapsack containing eight more loaded magazines, a 9 mm Luger M80 pistol, a utility knife, and a bottle of gasoline.

As El Khazzani exited the lavatory, he encountered 28-year-old Frenchman "Damien A." On seeing the heavily armed El Khazzani, Damien attempted to restrain the gunman, but was overpowered and fell to the floor. Seated nearby, American-born Frenchman Mark Moogalian (age 51) saw the scuffle, got up, and in the ensuing struggle wrested the rifle from El Khazzani. As Moogalian turned to move his wife out of harm's way, El Khazzani pulled out a concealed 9 mm Luger M80 pistol and shot Moogalian in the back, with the bullet passing through his lung and exiting via his neck. Moogalian fell to the floor and remained still, playing dead. El Khazzani retrieved his dropped carbine, walked to the passenger area and attempted to fire the weapon at the occupants of the car, but the weapon misfired.

Sitting about 10 metres (30 ft) down the aisle from El Khazzani were three American friends, two of them off-duty members of the United States Armed Forces: 23-year-old Airman First Class Spencer Stone, 22-year-old Specialist Alek Skarlatos, and 23-year-old Anthony Sadler. Alarmed by the sound of the gunshot that injured Moogalian, and seeing the assailant with an assault rifle, Skarlatos cried out to his friends "Get him!" Stone moved first, running up the aisle, straight at the gun-wielding El Khazzani and putting him into a chokehold. El Khazzani dropped the carbine, but repeatedly cut Stone in the hand, head, and neck with the utility knife; Stone's thumb was nearly severed. Skarlatos seized the jammed rifle off the floor and began "muzzle-thumping" El Khazzani about the head, while Stone continued his choke-hold. El Khazzani fell unconscious. In a video taken in the immediate aftermath, an American voice can be heard exclaiming, "Dude, I tried to shoot him."

Chris Norman, 62, a British passenger, and a French train driver helped to hold down El Khazzani, whom Norman later described as having "eyes devoid of humanity," and they used Norman's T-shirt to tie his arms behind his back. About his joining the struggle to subdue the shooter, Norman said, "I'm not going to be the guy who dies sitting down." "If you're going to die, try to do something about it."

Skarlatos then swept the other cars for more gunmen with the assault rifle and pistol in hand. He noted that the assault rifle was jammed and the pistol was missing a magazine and had no rounds in the chamber; neither gun was fire-ready. Stone, a military-trained medic, tried to stop the severe bleeding from Moogalian's gunshot wound by wrapping his shirt around the injury. This proved ineffective, so he inserted two fingers into the neck wound and pushed down on an artery, which stopped the bleeding.

The train was carrying 554 passengers and was passing Oignies in the Pas-de-Calais department when the attack took place, and it was rerouted to the station of Arras. Moogalian was airlifted to the University Hospital in Lille, while Stone was later treated for thumb and eye injuries and other wounds. The remaining passengers were taken to Arras, where they were searched and identified before being allowed to proceed to Paris.

== Assailant ==
Ayoub El Khazzani (born 3 September 1989, also spelled El-Khazzani and el-Qazzani) from Morocco was identified as the assailant by French and Spanish authorities; he had boarded the train in Brussels. He carried no identification but was identified by his fingerprints. He had resided in Aubervilliers, Seine-Saint-Denis, France, since 2014. He was originally from Tétouan in northern Morocco and moved to Spain in 2007, two years after his father had legalized his status there. He was an employee at the mobile phone operator firm Lycamobile for two months in early 2014 before having to leave due to not having the right work papers.

El Khazzani was known to French authorities and had been tagged with a fiche "S" (S file or security file), the highest warning level for French state security. He had been similarly profiled by Belgian, Spanish, and German authorities. He had reportedly lived in the Spanish cities of Madrid and Algeciras from 2007 to March 2014. During his time in Spain, he attracted the attention of authorities after making speeches defending jihad, attending a known radical mosque, and being involved in drug trafficking. He then moved to France, and the Spanish authorities informed the French of their suspicions. French Interior Minister Bernard Cazeneuve said that he had moved to Belgium first in 2015. He had reportedly spent time between May and July in Syria before moving to France.

=== Motives and confession ===
El Khazzani initially told his lawyer that he was simply a homeless man who, while sleeping in a Brussels park, found a suitcase containing a rifle and pistol, and that he had no intention to massacre the passengers but planned to rob them so that he might eat. However, authorities said that his explanations became less plausible with each questioning and that he had eventually stopped talking to investigators; the prosecutor François Molins called El Khazzani's story "barely credible." He said El Khazzani had listened to a "YouTube audio file in which the individual exhorted his followers to raise arms and fight in the name of the prophet" and that his Internet browsing history showed "clear evidence of terrorist intent." Prosecutors discovered the files on his phone, which they say he listened to immediately prior to the attack.

In December 2016, El Khazzani confessed to French courts that he had come from Syria and had traveled to Europe for the express purpose of killing Americans in revenge for bombings in Syria. He told a French judge, "I'm a real jihadist, but we do not kill women and children. I am not a slaughterer. I am a noble fighter. I am a soldier." French authorities did not believe El Khazzani's assertions that he wasn't planning a mass killing in light of the nine fully loaded magazines he had brought on board in order to reload his weapon. Of El Khazzani's claim that he decided against murder once he had seen the Americans, Stone told the court, "If he'd wanted to stop he wouldn't have tried to kill me three times."

=== Possible source of weapons ===
The French newspaper La Voix du Nord said that the gunman in the Thalys attack may have had connections to groups targeted by the Belgian counter-terror operation, and authorities investigated the link. One of the gunmen in the 2015 Île-de-France attacks, Amedy Coulibaly, had purchased automatic weapons and a rocket launcher from Belgian gangs, allegedly in a black market near Brussels-South railway station, the station where El Khazzani boarded the train.

=== Legal proceedings ===
Preliminary charges were filed against El Khazzani on 25 August 2015 by the Paris prosecutor's office for attempted murder in connection with terrorism, possession of weapons in connection with terrorism, and participation in a terrorist conspiracy. He was remanded in custody. On 16 November 2020, he and three suspected accomplices were put on trial in a Paris court. The other three are Bilal Chatra from Algeria, Mohamed Bakkali and Redouane Sebbar. Their trial went forward in November 2020 and Spencer Stone and Alek Skarlatos were scheduled to testify, but Stone was hospitalized and thus unable to be called by the prosecution.

El Khazzani: Was convicted of attempted murders and conspiracy to commit an act of terrorism, and received life imprisonment followed by deportation from France. El Khanazzi claimed at the trial that Abdelhamid Abaaoud, who led the terrorist cell which had perpetrated the January 2015 Île-de-France attacks and had been killed in a raid on 18 November 2015, had organized the train attack.

Three other men were tried on charges of having helped the attacker, and others, travel from Syria to Belgium and of having aided his preparations for the assault.

Bilal Chatra from Algeria was sentenced to 27 years in prison with a lifetime ban from returning to French territory. It was found that he helped El Khazzani and Abaaoud travel between Belgium and Syria. The court found the evidence supported Chatra being in Brussels at the time of the attack, something which he had denied.

Mohamed Bakkali was sentenced to 25 years in prison and a lifetime ban from returning to French territory. According to the prosecution, Bakkali had chauffeured a vehicle to Hungary and Germany to take El Khazzani and Abaaoud to an apartment in Brussels. During the court proceeding, he maintained his innocence. The judge said that the court did not find these protestations credible and added that police investigations had found many telephone calls proving that he was a close associate of the El Bakraoui brothers, who had killed themselves and victims in the 2016 Brussels suicide bombings.

Redouane El Amrani Ezzerrifi, a 28-year-old Moroccan, was sentenced to seven years in prison. He had aided three people to join the Islamic State in Syria.

== Involved passengers ==
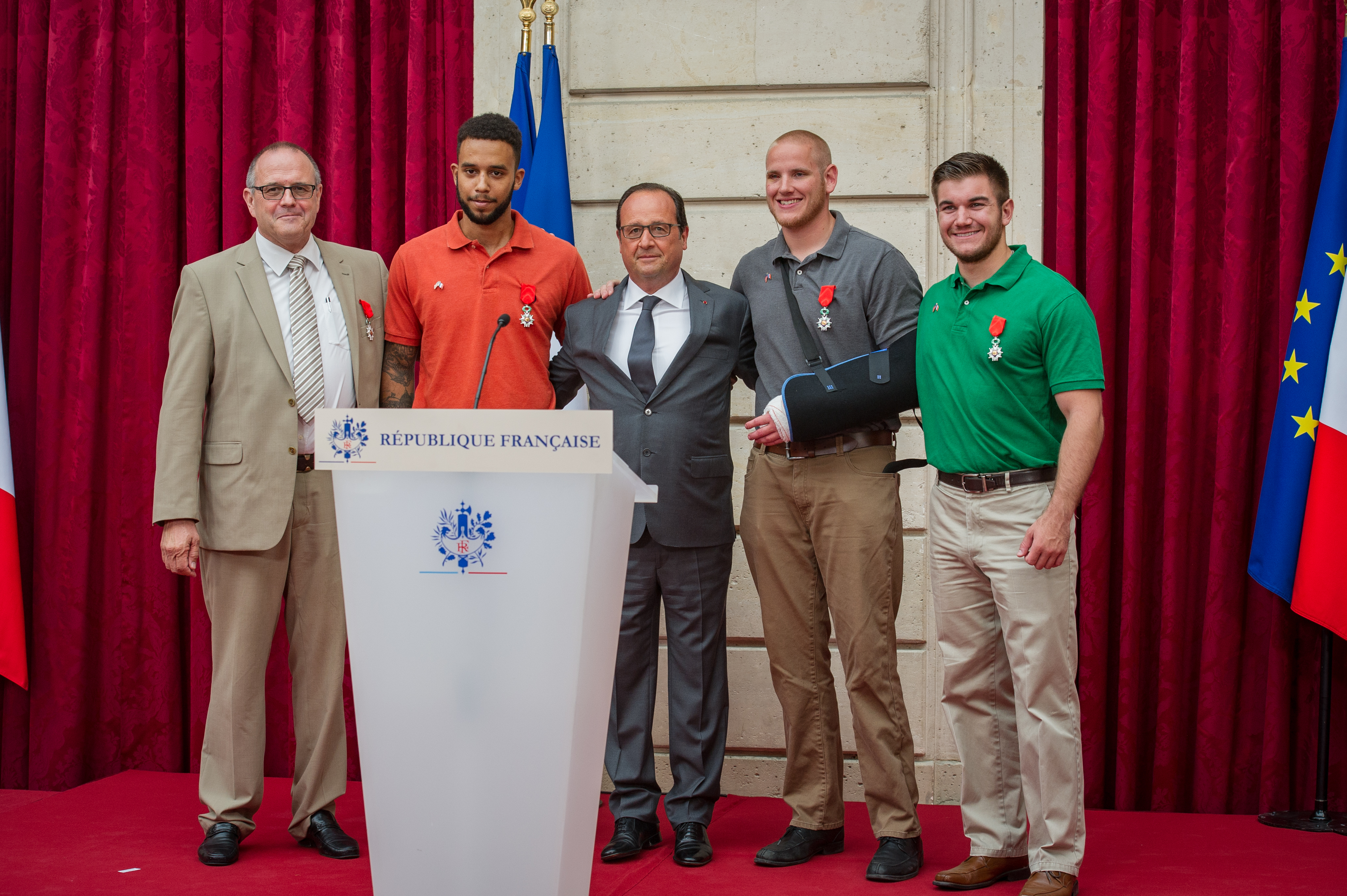
Chris Norman, Anthony Sadler, President Hollande, Spencer Stone, and Alek Skarlatos after their Legion of Honour ceremony at the Élysée Palace on 24 August 2015

The following passengers were noted by the press for their involvement in the incident:

- Damien A., a 28-year-old French banker, the first passenger to tackle the gunman; he wished to remain anonymous.
- Mark Moogalian, a 51-year-old American-born Frenchman with dual nationality who teaches English at the Sorbonne. The second passenger to intervene, he momentarily wrestled the rifle away from the gunman. He sustained a critical gunshot injury to the neck that required emergency surgery at Lille that saved his life.
- Chris Norman, a 62-year-old British businessman living in France. He helped subdue the gunman.
- Anthony Sadler, a 23-year-old American student in his senior year at California State University, Sacramento, and a high school classmate of Stone and Skarlatos, whom he helped tackle the gunman.
- Alek Skarlatos, a 22-year-old American Oregon Army National Guard specialist, on leave after deployment in Afghanistan, former neighbor and classmate of Stone; he struck El Khazzani with the jammed assault rifle. Skarlatos was later elected to the Oregon House of Representatives.

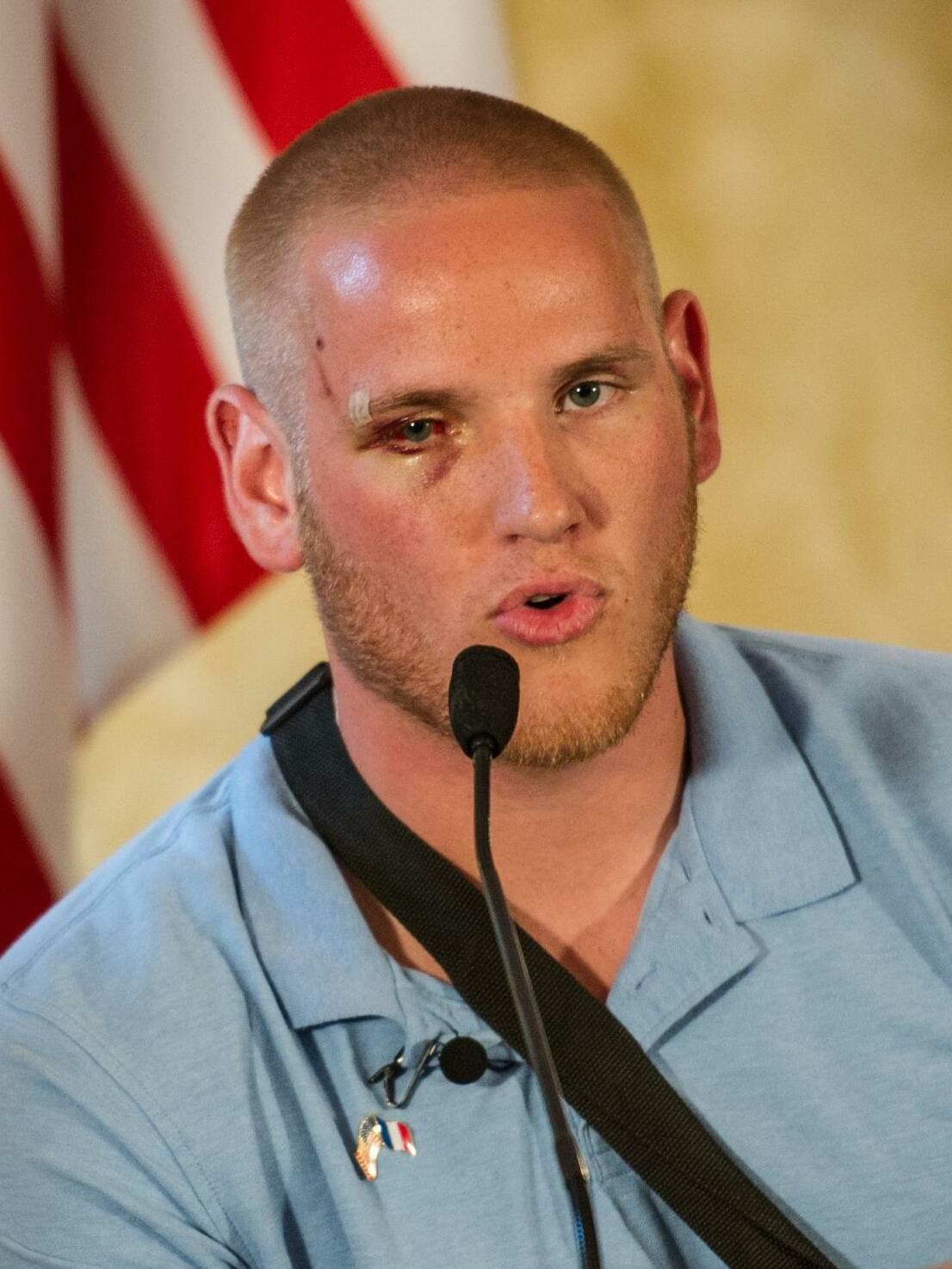
Spencer Stone talks to reporters during a news conference in Paris on 23 August 2015

- Spencer Stone, A 23-year-old American Airman First Class in the United States Air Force, who was on leave from the 65th Air Base Group, seized the assailant and held him in a chokehold. In the process, he sustained several cuts, a fractured finger, and an injury to his right eye, which were treated at a hospital near Lille and later at Ramstein Air Base in Germany.
- An off-duty French train driver who also helped subdue the gunman; his name has not been released.

Norman, Sadler, Skarlatos, and Stone were made Knights of the Legion of Honour (chevaliers de la Légion d'honneur) on 24 August by French president François Hollande. Moogalian was also made a Knight of the Legion of Honour on 13 September 2015, with Damien A. expected to be similarly honored at a later date; he reportedly received it in the post while preserving his anonymity. Norman, Sadler, and Skarlatos were also awarded the medal of the city of Arras.

In the United States, Sadler was also awarded the Secretary of Defense Medal for Valor. Skarlatos was awarded the Soldier's Medal, the highest medal awarded to Army personnel for actions outside of combat, while Stone was awarded the Airman's Medal and the Purple Heart and meritoriously promoted two grades on 1 November to Staff Sergeant. Stone and Sadler also received the Civic Medal 1st class from the Prime Minister of Belgium.

Sadler, Skarlatos, and Stone were naturalized as French citizens in an honorary ceremony at the Alliance française in Sacramento, California, on 31 January 2019.

== Reactions ==
=== Government reactions ===
- France: The three Americans and Norman were hailed as "true heroes" by the mayor of Arras, Frédéric Leturque. French president François Hollande and Interior Minister Bernard Cazeneuve praised them for their bravery.
- United Kingdom: British prime minister David Cameron praised the "extraordinary courage" of those involved in taking down the attacker, including Briton Chris Norman.
- United States: The White House stated that "the President expressed his profound gratitude for the courage and quick thinking of several passengers, including U.S. service members, who selflessly subdued the attacker ... It is clear that their heroic actions may have prevented a far worse tragedy." U.S. president Barack Obama called the three Americans on 22 August to personally thank them for their bravery. General Philip M. Breedlove of the U.S. European Command in Stuttgart, Germany, said the three Americans' actions "clearly illustrate the courage and commitment our young men and women have all the time, whether they are on duty or on leave."

=== EU collaboration ===
Koen Geens, the Belgian justice minister, called for increased collaboration within the EU on arms trafficking, saying, "I do not believe that these weapons are of Belgian origin," and, "There are far too many illegal Kalashnikovs and [military surplus] arriving in Belgium from Eastern Europe." He called for more effective arms control outside the Schengen zone, and flagged increased police powers against weapons traffickers. On 29 August, ministers from France, the UK, Germany, Italy, Spain, Belgium, Luxembourg, the Netherlands, and Switzerland met in Paris to discuss train security, including the possibility of using metal detectors for some international train passengers.

=== Security improvements ===
In response to the attack, the Belgian government decided to increase patrols of Belgian police at international train stations and to increase baggage checks. Belgian prime minister Charles Michel called for urgent talks with France, Germany and the Netherlands on increasing security on cross-border trains. The European Commission said that the Schengen treaty is non-negotiable, and that increased security checks cannot include border checks. European Union officials are now considering introducing metal detectors and body scans at all train stations, along with an increase in CCTV cameras inside trains.

== Investigations ==
Separate official investigations were launched by the governmental authorities of France, Spain, and Belgium. In addition, Thalys International launched their own internal investigation.

=== French and Spanish investigations ===
On 21 August, the anti-terrorist section of the French public prosecutor's office in Paris took over the investigation on the basis of "the arms used, the events that unfolded, and the context."

In view of the gravity of the acts he was accused of, the suspect was placed in custody for a period which could be extended to 96 hours. According to the police, from the modus operandi, the attack resembled a terrorist attack.

A Spanish police spokesman said that the suspect's parents' house in Algeciras had been searched.

In the aftermath of the November 2015 attacks in Paris, it was reported that Abdelhamid Abaaoud was under investigation by French police as a possible link to the Thalys attack.

On 14 February 2018, French police arrested a Moroccan citizen in Paris who was suspected of involvement in the attack. The man was travelling from his home in Spain to Belgium at the time of his arrest.

=== Belgian investigation ===
A spokesman for the Belgian Federal Prosecutor's Office announced on 22 August that they had launched an investigation into the attempted attack. They consider that Belgium is involved due to the heavily armed perpetrator having boarded the train at Brussels-South railway station. In October 2017, Belgian police announced that after conducting six searches, they had charged two additional people identified as Mohamed Bakkali who was accused of leading a terrorist group and Youssef Siraj as being a group member involved in the attack. They were transported to France for prosecution.

=== Thalys investigation ===
At the initiative of the French National Railway's President, Guillaume Pepy, an internal investigation was launched by Thalys in order to shed light on the sequence of events during the attack.

On 18 September 2015, Thalys published an internal report about the assault.

=== Developments in 2019 ===
A reconstruction of the attack was made at El Khazzani's request, in September 2019. He said that he let himself be captured as he felt unable to shoot his first target; that he was acting under the orders of Abdelhamid Abaaoud, the coordinator of the "Islamic State" group's cell that struck France and Belgium in 2015 and 2016; and that he was to attack American soldiers, though he could not explain how he knew they were on the train and who they were. As of 2019 four other men were under investigation in France, primarily Bilal Chatra and Redouane Sebbar. Chatra was implicated as having played the role of people smuggler for El Khazzani and Abaaoud on their return journey from Syria amongst the flow of migrants. Sebbar is thought to have participated in the preparations for the shooting. Mohamed Bakkali was considered an essential logistician in the terrorist cell, and Youssef Siraj was accused of having housed El Khazzani in Brussels before the attack.

== Controversies ==
=== Actions of train crew ===
The French actor Jean-Hugues Anglade, who was traveling in the last car before the rear engine, alleged that the train crew locked themselves in the engine car and did not come to the aid of passengers. He said they heard gunshots and screaming in the next car, after which several crew members rushed past them to the engine car, opened it with a key and locked themselves inside. He said the dozen passengers in his car banged on it and begged the crew to open it. He also said that when Sadler came into their car searching for blankets and a first aid kit for the wounded, Sadler also banged on the door of the engine car to no avail.

Anglade's claims were denied by the Thalys corporation, and he later acknowledged that the two crew members who locked themselves in the engine car with a handful of passengers were not Thalys employees but contractors from a catering company. He added, "The French conductor and the other Thalys employee present in the coach where the assault took place showed ... heroic behavior."

Agnès Ogier, director-general of Thalys, defended the train employees, who she said "fulfilled their duty" and were unaware the terrorist had been subdued. She also reported that a male employee took five or six passengers with him while seeking shelter.

=== Treatment of suspect ===
On 26 August, El Khazzani's lawyer, Me Mani Ayadi, criticised the treatment of his client during the latter's transfer to the courthouse, where a handcuffed El Khazzani was walked into the building blindfolded and barefoot. In response, a French official familiar with the case stated that the authorities followed standard security precautions, which dictate that suspects charged with terrorism and organized crime be blindfolded so they cannot later identify the officials escorting them. The official also said the accused refused to wear the shoes offered to him.

On 1 September, the French public prosecutor's office issued a warning to the television network i-Télé after its 25 August broadcast showing suspect El Khazzani arriving at the courthouse in handcuffs. It is illegal in France to publish, without their consent, images of criminal suspects in handcuffs if they have not yet been convicted, because of the presumption of innocence. I-Télé digitally blurred out El Khazzani's hands, but the prosecutor's office warned the network that this was insufficient and criminal charges would be brought against it if this reoccurred.

== Film ==
In 2018, the event was dramatised as the film The 15:17 to Paris, directed by Clint Eastwood, with Sadler, Skarlatos and Stone playing themselves.

== See also ==
- January 2015 anti-terrorism operations in Belgium
- Jewish Museum of Belgium shooting
- Saint-Quentin-Fallavier attack
- November 2015 Paris attacks
- 2025 Cambridgeshire train stabbing
- List of Islamist terrorist attacks

== Sources ==
- CNN - Video of interview with Isabelle Moogalian including cell phone video of Stone administering first aid
