= Civic Decoration =

Civic Decoration (Belgium)
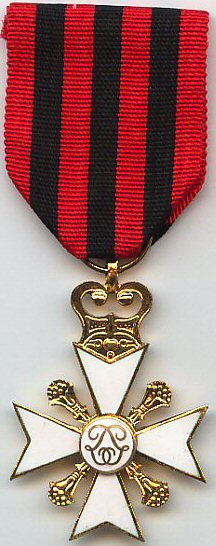
- Civic Cross First Class (For Long Service in the Administration)
- Type: Decoration (cross and medal)
- Awarded for: Meritorious, long service or exemplary behaviour or act
- Presented by: Kingdom of Belgium
- Eligibility: Belgian civilians
- Status: Currently awarded
- Established: 21 July 1867

Precedence
- Next (higher): Order of Leopold II

The Civic Decoration (French: Décoration Civique, Dutch: Burgerlijke Ereteken) is a civilian decoration of the Kingdom of Belgium. It was first established by royal decree on 21 July 1867 to reward exceptional acts of bravery, devotion or humanity. A further royal decree of 15 January 1885 extended the award to state civil servants for long service by a mere change of ribbon. The award statute was once again amended by royal decree in 1902 to include long service in the Civic Guard and firefighters, each with its distinctive ribbon.

Two wartime variants were created to reward civilians who distinguished themselves during the World Wars. The Civic Decoration 1914–1915 (later dated 1918) was created on 18 May 1915 to reward civilians and non-combatants who served their country with distinction during World War I. A similar Decoration was also established for World War II on 21 July 1944 by the Belgian government in exile.

The Civic Decoration, previously solely awarded by Royal Decree, has been awarded directly by regions and communities since the 1993 federalisation of Belgium.

== Award statute ==
=== Classes ===
The Civic Decoration is awarded in two categories:

- The Civic Cross (further subdivided into a First and a Second Class);
- The Civic Medal (further subdivided into a First, Second and Third Class).

These classes are common to all the types of the Civic Decoration.

=== Award criteria ===
The Civic Decoration for long and distinguished service in the administration and firefighters is awarded:

- Civic Cross: for 35 years of meritorious service, with the First Class going to employees of higher rank;
- Civic Medal: for 25 years of meritorious service, with the First Class going to employees of higher rank.

The Civic Medal Third Class (bronze), which was principally intended for award to indigenous personnel in the colonies, is no longer awarded.

The Decoration for exceptional acts of bravery, devotion or humanity is awarded on a case-by-case basis. The Civic Cross First Class for exceptional acts of bravery, devotion or humanity is only awarded posthumously.

== Award description ==
The badge of the Civic Cross is a white enamelled maltese cross with the central medallion bearing the monogram of King Leopold I or of King Albert I (for the 1914–1918 Cross) on the obverse and reverse. Between the arms of the Cross are:

- Crossed swords for the Civic Cross 1914–1918
- Crossed flaming torches for the Civic Cross 1940–1945;
- A Burgundy Cross for the Civic Cross for administrative services and for services as a firefighter.

The cross 1st class is gilt, the second class is silver.

The Medal is vaguely octagonal and looks like a closed florian cross, it bears the relief image of the Civic Cross. The medal for 1914–1918 is topped with crossed swords, the medal for 1940–1945 is topped with crossed flaming torches. The medal first class is gold, the second class is silver and the third class is bronze.

The ribbons of the Civic Decoration and Medal differ with the type of award:

- The ribbon is red with three vertical black stripes when the award is for long and distinguished service in the administration;
- The ribbon is red with two vertical black stripes bordered on each side by a yellow line when the award is for exceptional acts of bravery, devotion or humanity;
- The ribbon is green with two vertical white stripes when the award is for long and distinguished service as a firefighter;
- The ribbon is pale green with vertical black, yellow and red stripes on each edge (black towards the center) and a central vertical gold stripe for the 1914–1918 award;
- The ribbon is saffron with vertical black, yellow and red stripes on each edge (red towards the center) and a central vertical black stripe for the 1940–1945 award.

The ribbons of the war time awards are adorned with a metal clasp bearing 1914–1918 or 1940–1945.

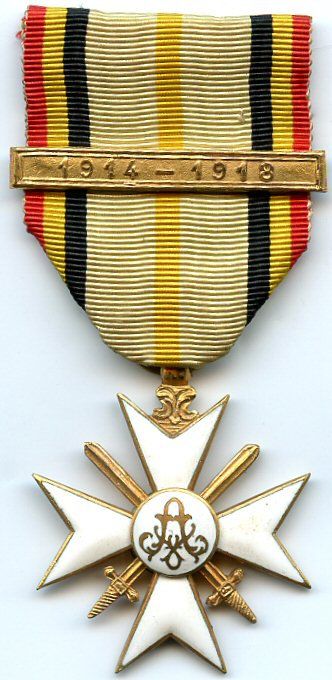
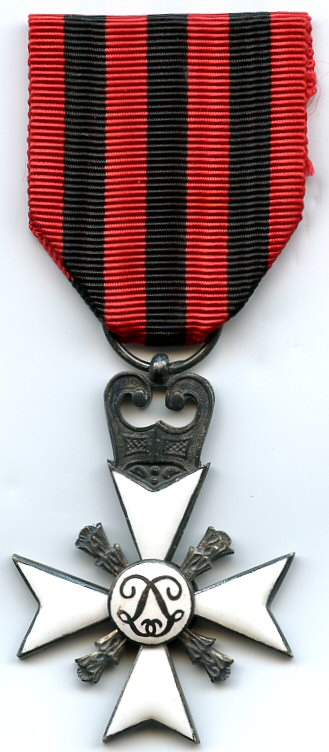
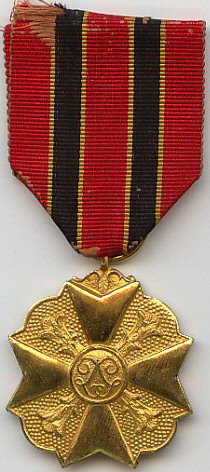
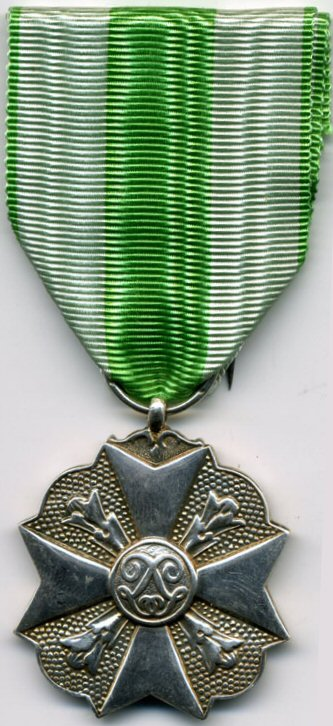
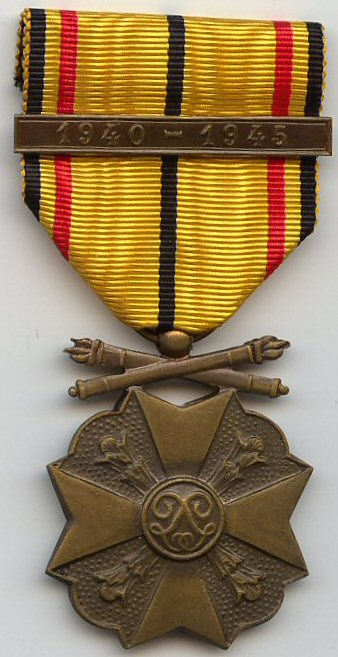
Civic Cross First Class	Civic Cross Second Class	Civic Medal First Class	Civic Medal Second Class	Civic Medal Third Class
Ribbon for World War 1 service	Ribbon for service in the administration	Ribbon for exceptional acts of bravery, devotion or humanity	Ribbon for long and distinguished service as a firefighter	Ribbon for World War 2 service

== Notable recipients (partial lists) ==
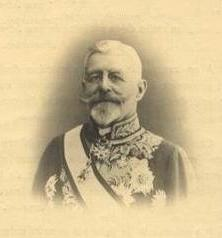
Baron Auguste Goffinet, a recipient of the Civic Cross 2nd class

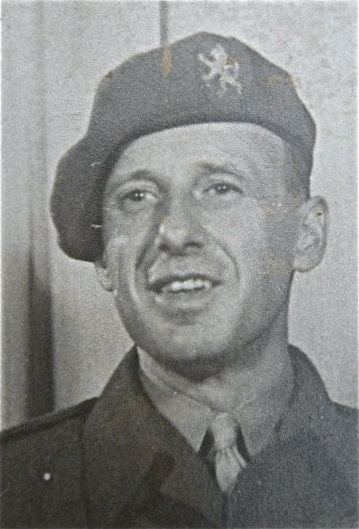
Henri Bernard, a recipient of the 1914–1918 Civic Medal 1st class

=== Civic Cross 1st class ===
- Count Beaudoin de Lichtervelde*Baron Albert Houtard
- Count Edmond Carton de Wiart
- Count Louis Cornet d’Elzius de Ways Ruart
- Baron Émile de Cartier de Marchienne
- Viscount Jacques Davignon
- August de Schryver
- Ambassador Jacques Delvaux de Fenffe
- Vicount Gaston Eyskens
- Camille Huysmans
- Edmond Leburton
- Baron Albert Lilar
- Hendrik Marck
- Baron Charles Papeians de Morchoven
- Louis Roppe
- Count Jean-Charles Snoy et d’Oppuers
- Paul van den Boeynants
- Baron Joseph van der Elst
- Alfons Vranckx

=== Civic Cross 2nd class ===
- Civic Guard Colonel Baron Auguste Goffinet
- Civic Guard Colonel Baron Constant Goffinet
- Baron Paul Kronacker
- Michel Lévie
- Sir Donald Stewart, 1st Baronet

=== Civic Medal 1st class ===
- Jozef De Saeger
- Baron Raoul du Sart de Bouland
- Albert Lavens
- Anthony Sadler
- Spencer Stone
- Geraard van den Daele
- Baron François-Xavier van der Straden Waillet
- Jan Hollander

=== 1914–1918 Civic Cross 1st class ===
- Paul Charles
- Gérard Cooreman
- Count Charles de Broqueville
- Cardinal Désiré Mercier
- Viscount Georges Terlinden

=== 1914–1918 Civic Cross 2nd class ===
- Count Arnold t’Kint de Roodenbeke

=== 1940–1945 Civic Cross 1st class ===
- Baron Albert Houtard
- Baron Charles Poswick
- Baron Pierre van Outryve d’Ydewalle

== See also ==
- Orders, decorations, and medals of Belgium

== Other sources ==
- Quinot H., 1950, Recueil illustré des décorations belges et congolaises, 4e Edition. (Hasselt)
- Cornet R., 1982, Recueil des dispositions légales et réglementaires régissant les ordres nationaux belges. 2e Ed. N.pl., (Brussels)
- Borné A.C., 1985, Distinctions honorifiques de la Belgique, 1830–1985 (Brussels)
