= Secretary of Defense Medal for Valor =

Office of the Secretary of Defense Medal for Valor
- Reverse (right) and obverse (left) of the Office of the Secretary of Defense Medal for Valor
- Type: Civilian valor award
- Awarded for: An act of heroism or sacrifice, with voluntary risk of personal safety in the face of danger either on or off the job.
- Country: United States
- Presented by: the Office of the Secretary of Defense
- Eligibility: Department of Defense civilian employees and private individuals
- Status: Currently awarded
- Established: 2001
- First award: 15 July 2002
- Final award: 14 August 2018

Highlights
- Total: 17
- Ribbon bar of the medal

Precedence
- Equivalent: Distinguished Service Cross (U.S. Army)
- Related: Secretary of the Army Award for Valor

The Office of the Secretary of the Defense Medal for Valor is the highest civilian award for valor presented by the United States Department of Defense. Created in 2001 in the aftermath of the September 11 attacks, the medal recognizes government employees and private citizens who perform an act of heroism or sacrifice, with voluntary risk to their personal safety in the face of danger.

== History ==
The medal was created in late 2001. The military equivalent of the medal for army soldiers is the Distinguished Service Cross.

== Eligibility ==
The act of bravery is eligible for recognition if the act is:

- Related to a Department of Defense employee or activity
- The Department of Defense in some way benefits from the act
- The employee is saved by an individual or the employee saves an individual from danger.

== Appearance ==
The medal of the award is gold in color and 34.925 millimeters (1.3750 in) in diameter. The obverse depicts a five pointed star on top of a laurel wreath. At the top of the medal is inscribed "VALOR". The reverse of the medal has a small laurel wreath under a rectangular plate for engraving the recipient's name. The words “AWARDED TO” are inscribed above and parallel to the name plate. Below the plate are the words “FOR EXHIBITING BRAVERY”. The medal is suspended from a ribbon 35 mm in width in ultramarine blue. On either side of the ribbon are two stripes of old glory red, inside the red are two thin stripes of white.

== Recipients ==
- Eric M. Jones, for actions at the Pentagon on 11 September 2001
- Steve A. DeChiaro, for actions at the Pentagon on 11 September 2001
- Dr. Andrew Rathmell, for actions in Baquba, Iraq on 21 January 2004
- Alan Johnston, for actions in al-Kasik, Iraq on 7 August 2004
- James M. Feltis III, for action on 11 January 2005 (armed suspect)
- John Kinnard for actions at the Pentagon on 11 September 2001 and for actions on 11 January 2005 (armed suspect) Currently, the only individual awarded the medal twice.
- David Queen, for actions on 11 January 2005 (armed suspect)
- William Caouette, for actions on 11 January 2005 (armed suspect)
- Peter A. Donaldson, for actions in April, 2008, rescuing a woman from a burning home
- Jeffery Amos, for the actions during the 2010 Pentagon shooting 4 March 2010
- Marvin Carraway, Jr., for the actions during the 2010 Pentagon shooting 4 March 2010
- Dexter Jones, for the actions during the 2010 Pentagon shooting 4 March 2010
- Colin Richards, for the actions during the 2010 Pentagon shooting 4 March 2010
- Jackie Benefield, for the actions during the 7 August 2011 on FOB Fenty
- David Jensen, for the actions on 10 September 2012 on Bagram Air Base, Afghanistan
- William "Tim" Nix, for his actions on 7 August 2015 defending against an insurgent attack against Camp Integrity, Afghanistan.
- Michael Dunne, for his actions on 7 August 2015 defending against an insurgent attack against Camp Integrity, Afghanistan.
- Brandon Seabolt, for his valor under enemy fire during combat operations on 17 December 2015 in Helmand, Afghanistan.
- Anthony Sadler, for his actions on 21 August 2015 stopping a gunman during the 2015 Thalys train attack

== See also ==
- Awards and decorations of the United States government
