= Spencer Stone =

American former staff sergeant (born 1992)

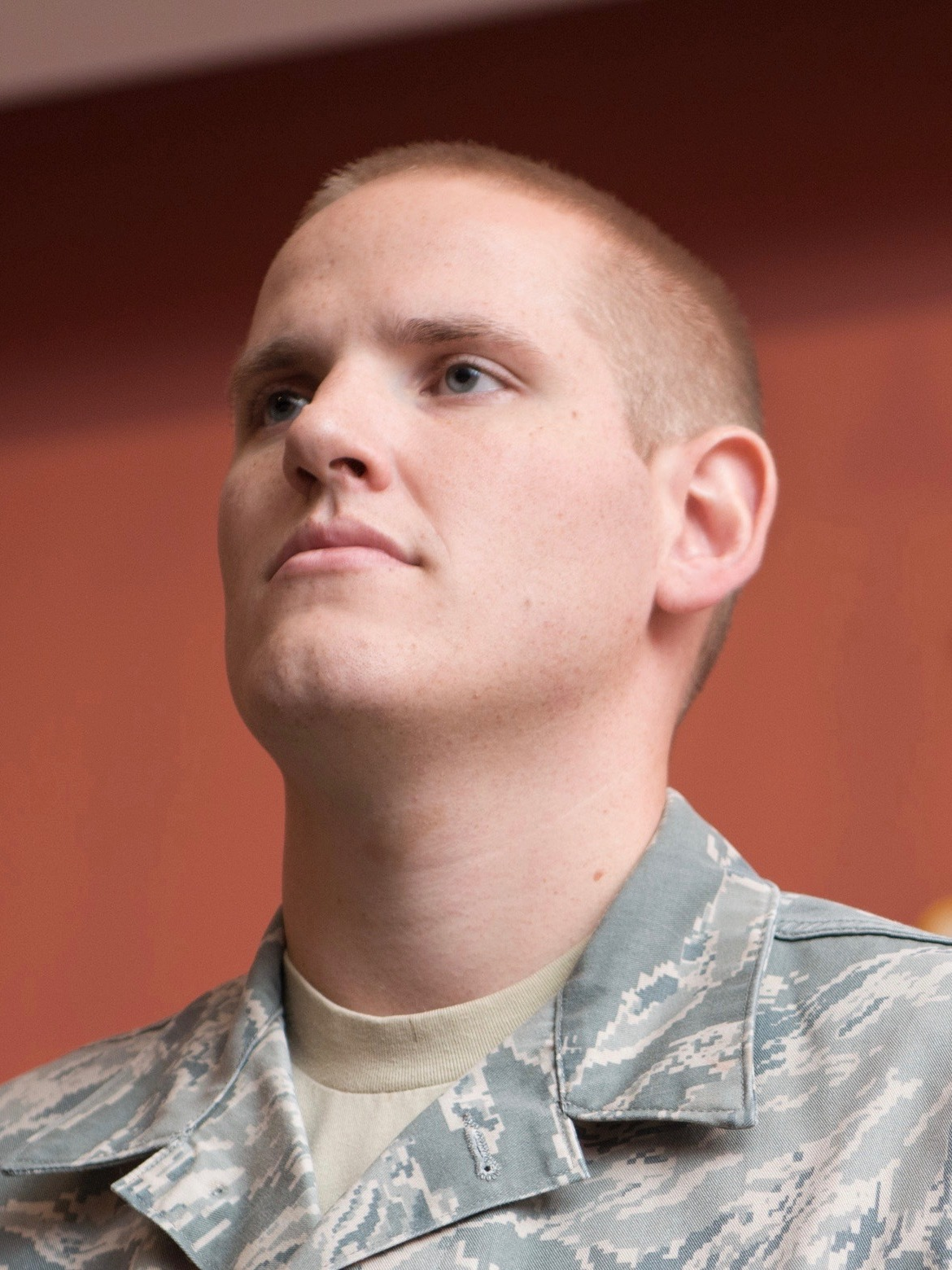
- Stone listens during a promotion ceremony at Travis Air Force Base, California, October 30, 2015.
- Born: Spencer John Stone; August 13, 1992 (age 34); Sacramento, California, U.S.
- Citizenship: United States; France (since 2018)
- Education: Del Campo High School
- Known for: Heroism in stopping a gunman on a Paris-bound train travelling from Amsterdam in August 2015
- Military career
- Allegiance: United States
- Branch: United States Air Force
- Service years: 2012–2016
- Rank: Staff sergeant
- Nickname: Captain America
- Unit: 65th Air Base Group
- Awards: List

Spencer John Stone (born August 13, 1992) is an American former United States Air Force staff sergeant. In August 2015, Stone, along with friends Alek Skarlatos and Anthony Sadler and three other passengers, as well as an off-duty train driver, while travelling from Amsterdam on a high speed, Paris-bound train, disarmed and subdued a solitary, heavily armed Moroccan terrorist. Three days later, French President François Hollande awarded Stone, Sadler, and Skarlatos, as well as British citizen Chris Norman, the Legion of Honour. Stone was recognized by U.S. Ambassador to France Jane D. Hartley for "his actions in saving countless lives" and by U.S. President Barack Obama, with a ceremony held at The Pentagon to honor the trio. For his bravery, Stone was awarded the Airman's Medal and a Purple Heart.

On October 8, 2015, Stone was stabbed during a fight in Sacramento and was released from the hospital on October 15. He was promoted to senior airman in late October and then staff sergeant in November 2015. In 2018, he portrayed himself in the Clint Eastwood-directed film The 15:17 to Paris which was based on the 2016 book of the same name detailing his experiences with Skarlatos and Sadler.

== Early life ==
Spencer John Stone was born on August 13, 1992, in Sacramento, California, to Brian Stone and Joyce Eskel. Stone has two siblings; an older brother Everett, who is a California Highway Patrolman in Redwood City and an older sister, Kelly. Growing up in Carmichael, Stone met his now-best friends Alek Skarlatos and Anthony Sadler while attending the small K-12 Freedom Christian School in Fair Oaks, continuing their friendship into adulthood. All three men are described as sharing "a deeply religious background and a belief in service to their community" and identify themselves as Christians. His mom stated that he wanted to become a soldier, watching countless Navy SEAL videos with him. Stone later attended Del Campo High School where he played football, basketball, and other contact sports. Stone played basketball in junior year through to senior year. A teacher and coach said Stone was always looking out for family and friends: "His blue-collar attitude and how he cared about others, he would have been the one to step up rather than curl into a ball," and that, "He was always trying to pick up his teammates, giving them a high five."

== 2015 Thalys train attack ==
Several ceremonies were held for Stone (and his friends) for stopping the Thalys train attack in 2015.

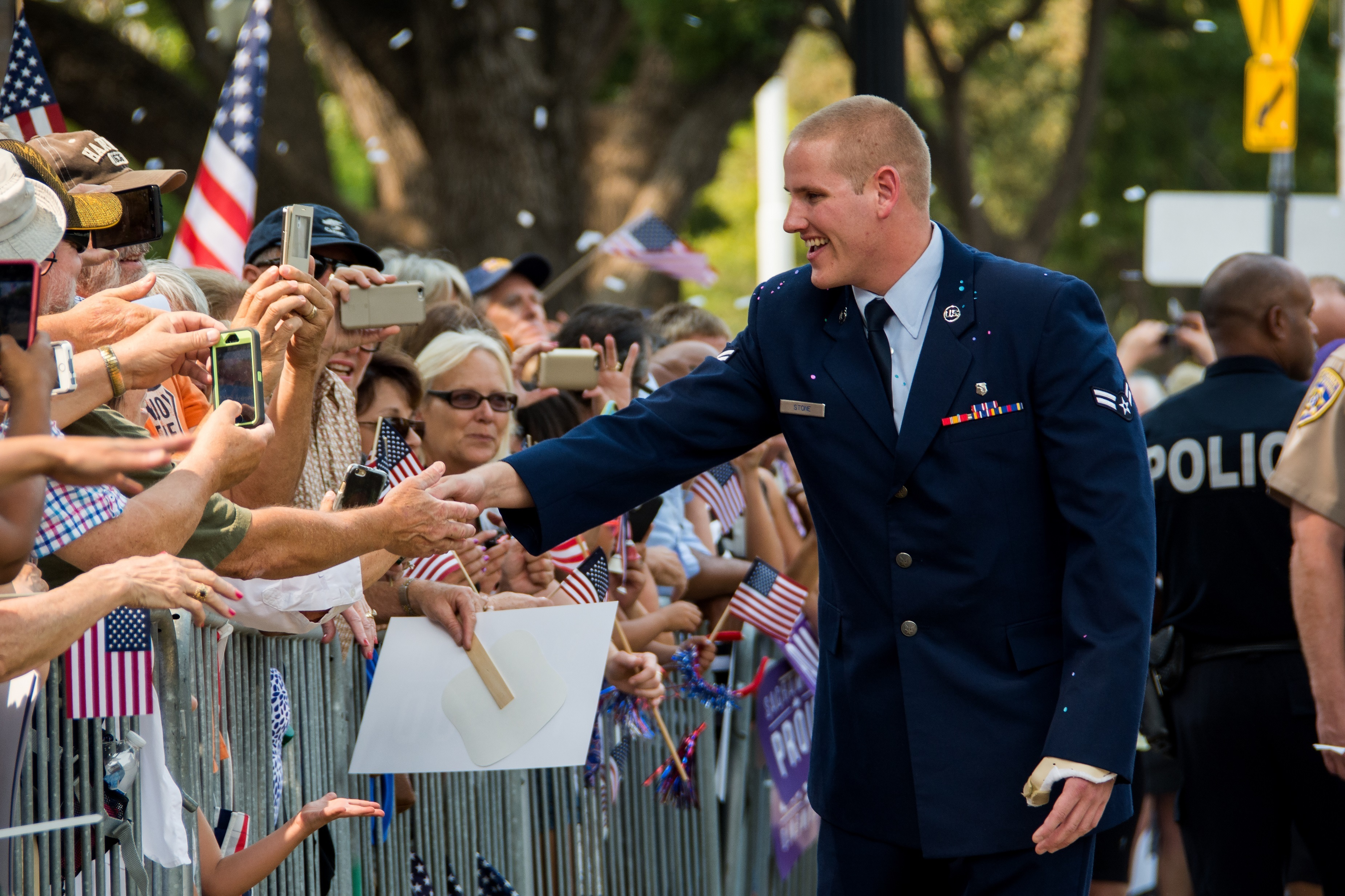
Stone is greeted with an exceptional hero's welcome during the Sacramento Hometown Heroes Parade and festivities at the State Capital building in downtown Sacramento, California on September 11, 2015.

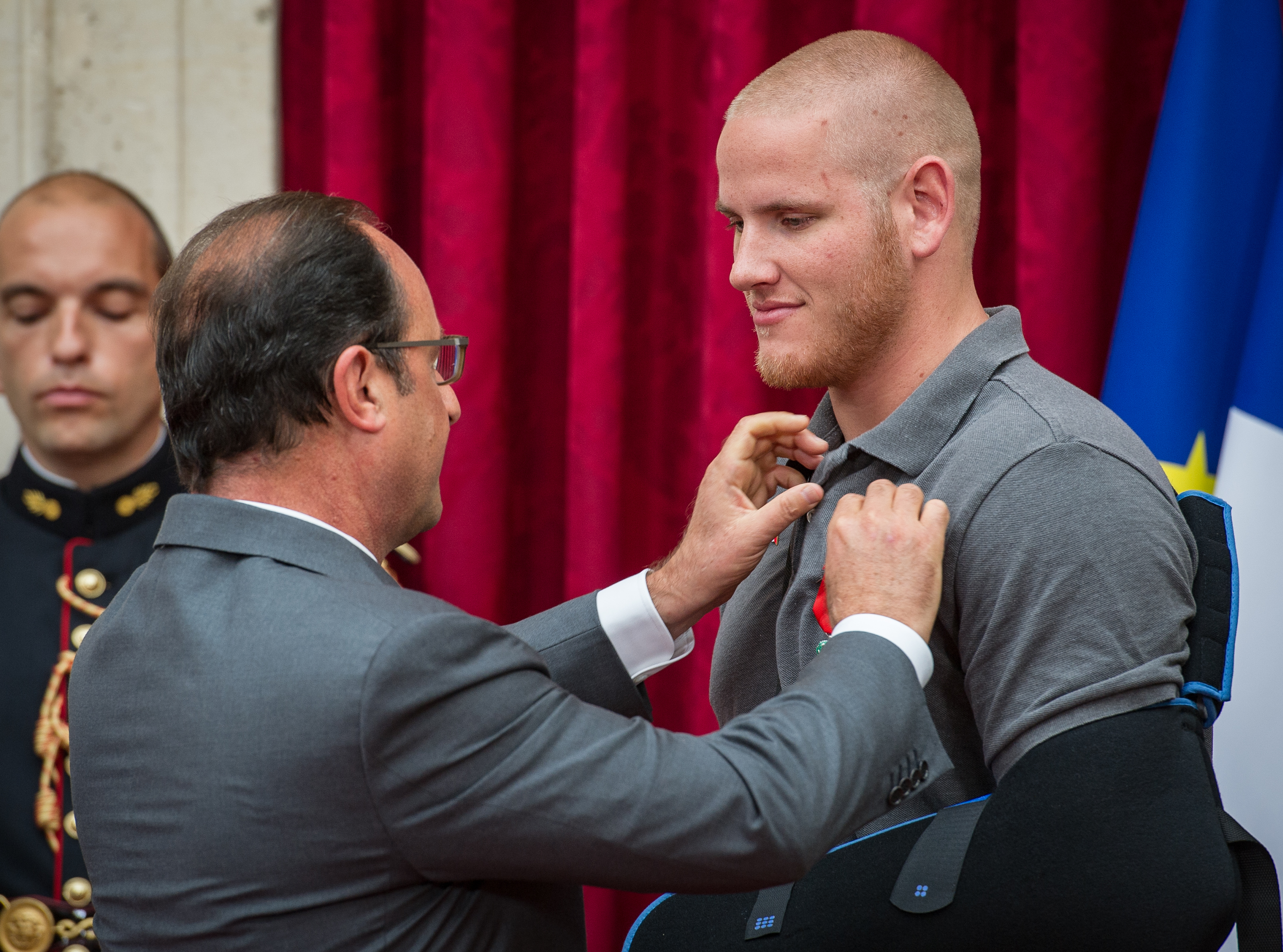
French President François Hollande pins the Legion of Honor on Stone during a ceremony at the Élysée in Paris on August 24, 2015.

On August 21, 2015, Stone and his childhood friends Alek Skarlatos and Anthony Sadler were traveling together during a sightseeing vacation in Europe when they boarded Thalys train 9364 from Amsterdam bound for Paris via Brussels. Stone had been serving at the United States Air Force 65th Air Base Group and was on leave before returning home. A 25-year-old Moroccan man, Ayoub El-Khazzani, was in train car No. 12, armed with a fully automatic Draco short barrel carbine and carrying an additional nine 30-round magazines of ammunition. Several people tried to stop the gunman, but failed to do so. Sadler reported that they heard a gunshot and breaking glass behind them, seeing an employee sprint down the aisle away from a shirtless man bearing a carbine. Stone had been awakened by the sound of the shot and of the breaking glass, with Skarlatos telling Stone to go. Armenian-American teacher and musician Mark Moogalian had wrested the carbine from Ayoub El-Khazzani, the terrorist, but was grievously wounded, shot by a Luger pistol his assailant had retained, who then retrieved his carbine from the floor. After the Draco misfired, Stone rushed El-Khazzani, tackling the terrorist. While holding him on the floor, Stone was stabbed up in the neck and eyebrow and had his thumb nearly severed. Skarlatos picked up the assailant's rifle, beating him in the head with its muzzle. Skarlatos stated that "I was thinking about survival," and "[i]t was to survive and for everybody else on the train to make it." After the gunman was disarmed and subdued, and until he was relieved by French EMT's at the next stop, Stone provided continuing life-saving first aid to Moogalian, who had received a bullet through his back, chest and neck. Moogalian's wife, Isabelle Risacher-Moogalian, credited Stone for saving her husband's life. Stone was transferred to the central hospital in Lille, France, and underwent treatment in Germany, before returning home to California on September 3, 2015.

=== International recognition ===
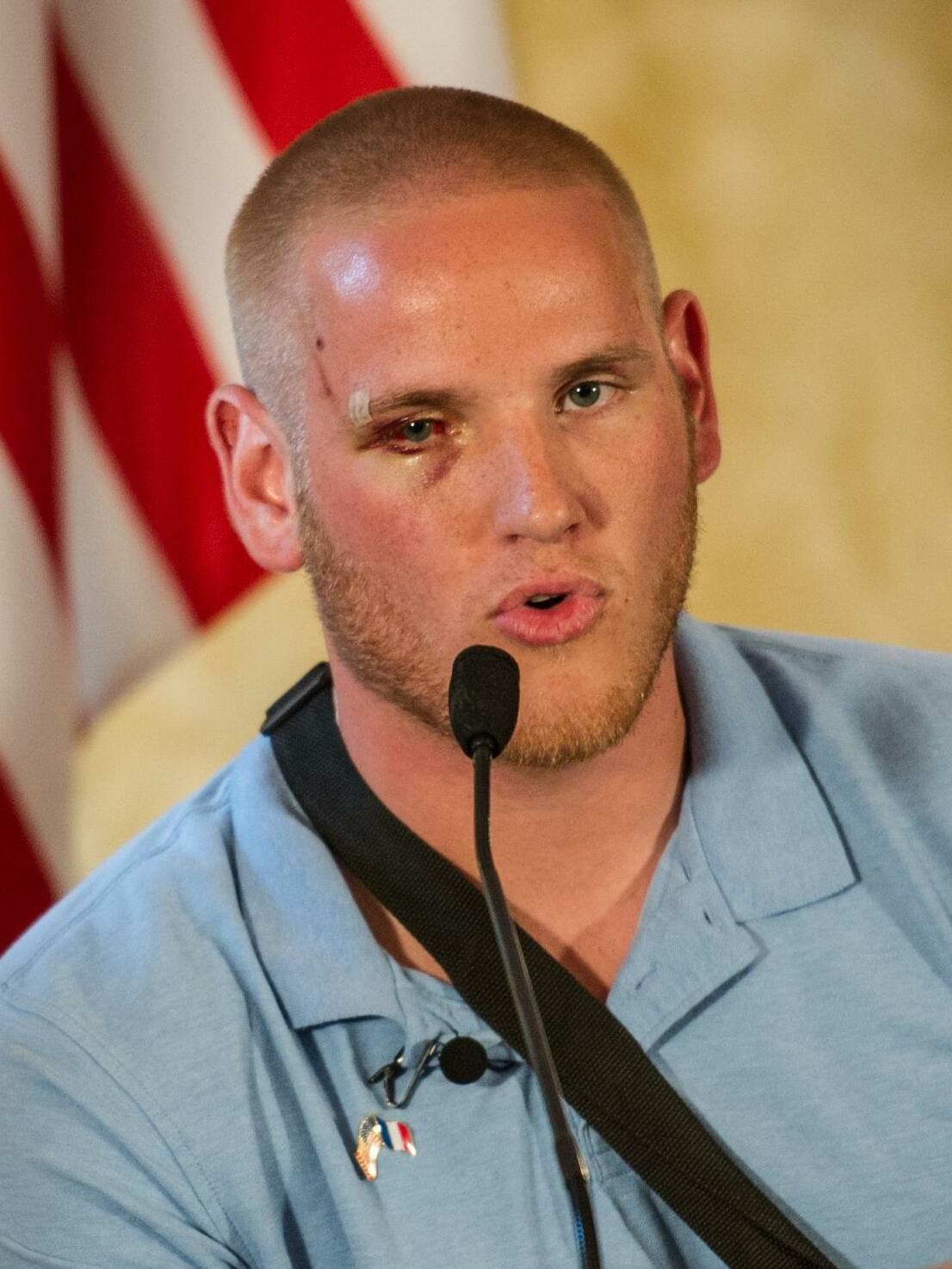
U.S. Air Force Airman 1st Class Spencer Stone briefs reporters during a news conference in Paris on August 23, 2015.

After the event, Stone, Skarlatos and Sadler received international attention for their actions in preventing the attack. French president François Hollande awarded Stone, his friends Alek Skarlatos and Anthony Sadler, as well as British businessman Chris Norman, France's highest decoration, Knights of the Legion of Honour (Chevaliers de la Légion d'honneur). Hollande said the men "faced [off] with terror" and that they "gave us a lesson in courage, in will, and therefore in hope". French Interior Minister Bernard Cazeneuve praised them for their bravery, as did then-British Prime Minister David Cameron.

The White House expressed gratitude for "courage and quick thinking of several passengers, including U.S. service members, who selflessly subdued the attacker..." U.S. President Barack Obama telephoned the three Americans, thanking them for their heroic actions. General Philip M. Breedlove of the U.S. European Command in Stuttgart, added his voice, calling the three Americans heroes for their actions which "clearly illustrate the courage and commitment our young men and women have all the time, whether they are on duty or on leave."

Kevin Johnson, mayor of Sacramento, California, held a parade to honor Skarlatos, Sadler, Stone, and the victims of the September 11 attacks. Stone was awarded a United States Air Force Airman's Medal and a Purple Heart at a ceremony held at The Pentagon. The Airman's Medal is infrequently awarded, and is only given for marked heroism outside of combat.

The trial of the terrorist and his three alleged accomplices went forward in November 2020. Spencer Stone and Alek Skarlatos were scheduled to testify, but Stone was hospitalized in France for undisclosed reasons and his testimony was delayed. Despite that, the prosecutors got the sentences they sought: El Khazzani, for attempted murders and conspiracy to commit an act of terrorism, received a life sentence, while the three accomplices who helped him to travel from Syria to France and armed him, Bilal Chatra, Rédouane El Amrani Ezzerrifi, and Mohamed Bakkali, received 27 years, 7 years, and 25 years, respectively. El Khazzani admitted that Abdelhamid Abaaoud, who was killed by French police in 2015, had masterminded the attack.

== Career ==
=== 2012–2016 ===
After high school, he enlisted in the United States Air Force and went on to become an aerospace medical services technician. Stone was initially assigned to the 60th Medical Operations Squadron pediatrics flight at Travis Air Force Base in Fairfield, California, as a medical technician responsible for screening children who needed to be treated, and trained at United States Forces Azores. João Santos, a trainer of Stone, said that he is "a really nice guy, polite, well-educated and very keen on learning." In October 2015, Stone was promoted to the rank of senior airman at Travis Air Force Base in California, due to the bold acts in France. Following this promotion, Stone was promoted to the rank of staff sergeant, effective November 1, 2016, by the order of United States Air Force Chief of Staff Gen. Mark A. Welsh III. Stone commented, saying "It is an honor to be promoted to staff sergeant, and I am extremely thankful for the opportunity to lead my fellow airmen," and that "I am ready for the growth and challenges that are ahead of me."

In January 2015, Stone attended the Airman Leadership School to become a non-commissioned officer. Stone announced he would be leaving the United States Air Force in November 2016 after having met with U.S. Ambassador to France Jane D. Hartley. He further piqued his interest in international relations. He plans on pursuing a degree in international relations at the University of California, Los Angeles or the University of Southern California.

=== 2016–present ===
Since his departure from the United States Air Force, Stone has made several public appearances. Honored at the Spike's annual 2016 Guys' Choice Awards, Stone and his friends Alek Skarlatos and Anthony Sadler accepted the hero award on June 4, 2016, from actor Clint Eastwood, sharing a conversation with him backstage. "People try and ask us what's the coolest things we've done, but I can name 100. It's hard to categorize them," Stone said.

It was announced in January 2016 that Stone, Skarlatos and Sadler were working with international correspondent and author Jeffrey E. Stern on a memoir entitled The 15:17 to Paris. It would feature the events of the 2015 Thalys train attack. A publicist for Perseus Books Group sensationalized their forthcoming memoir as "the gripping true story of a terrorist attack that would have killed more than 500 people if not for their actions, but it is also the story of three American boys, their friendship, and the values we hold dear." David Steinberger, president and chief executive officer of Perseus, said that he was "confident that this is going to be a film. It's extremely cinematic, and there's a lot of interest in the movie." He continued, "based on the material, that this was going to be an important book and one that readers were really going to respond to." The memoir was made available to the public on August 23, 2016, almost a year after the 2015 Thalys train attack. In the acknowledgements, Stone stated that he "give[s] all the credit to God" and made further acknowledgement of his family, friends, the United States Air Force, the citizens of Sacramento and the United States Armed Forces.

Stone, Skarlatos, and Sadler appeared on Who Wants to Be a Millionaire in October 2016 as a part of a special "Hometown Heroes" week. Playing as a team, they won $250,000.

In July 2017, it was announced that Clint Eastwood would direct the upcoming biographical film titled after Stone, Skarlatos and Sadler's memoir, starring them, along with actresses Jenna Fischer and Judy Greer. Filming began on July 11, 2017. The film was released in the United States on February 9, 2018. The film received a generally negative reception from critics, who were largely critical of the acting by the three leads, though critic Matt Zoller Seitz of RogerEbert.com expressed that "[the film]'s affable nothingness [was] redeemed only by the laid-back charisma of three men".

== Stabbing ==
On October 8, 2015, during an altercation, Stone was stabbed by Californian James Tran, 28, in downtown Sacramento. He was rushed to UC Davis Medical Center and was released from the hospital on October 15. There was an argument which subsided and the groups left separately. Tran stabbed him multiple times in the back with a knife. After the stabbing, Tran and his group fled the scene in a vehicle. Stone's companions and bystanders summoned emergency services. Medical staff determined that Stone had sustained multiple life-threatening injuries, and he underwent emergency open heart surgery to repair wounds to his lungs, liver, and heart.

Sacramento Police detectives were assigned to the case shortly after the stabbing. Along with video obtained of the assault, eyewitness statements, and tips from the public, detectives determined the identity of the assailant. An arrest warrant was issued for Tran. On November 4, 2015, Tran was arrested without incident, after law enforcement conducted a traffic stop near Tran's home in Elk Grove, California. Officials involved in the case said that it did not appear Tran or anyone in his group had been aware of Stone's heroism and stated that the crime did not appear to be a retaliatory strike by a terrorist organization (either directly or indirectly) against Stone for his part in foiling the terror attack. Tran had previous felony convictions, and he was likely intoxicated at the time of the assault.

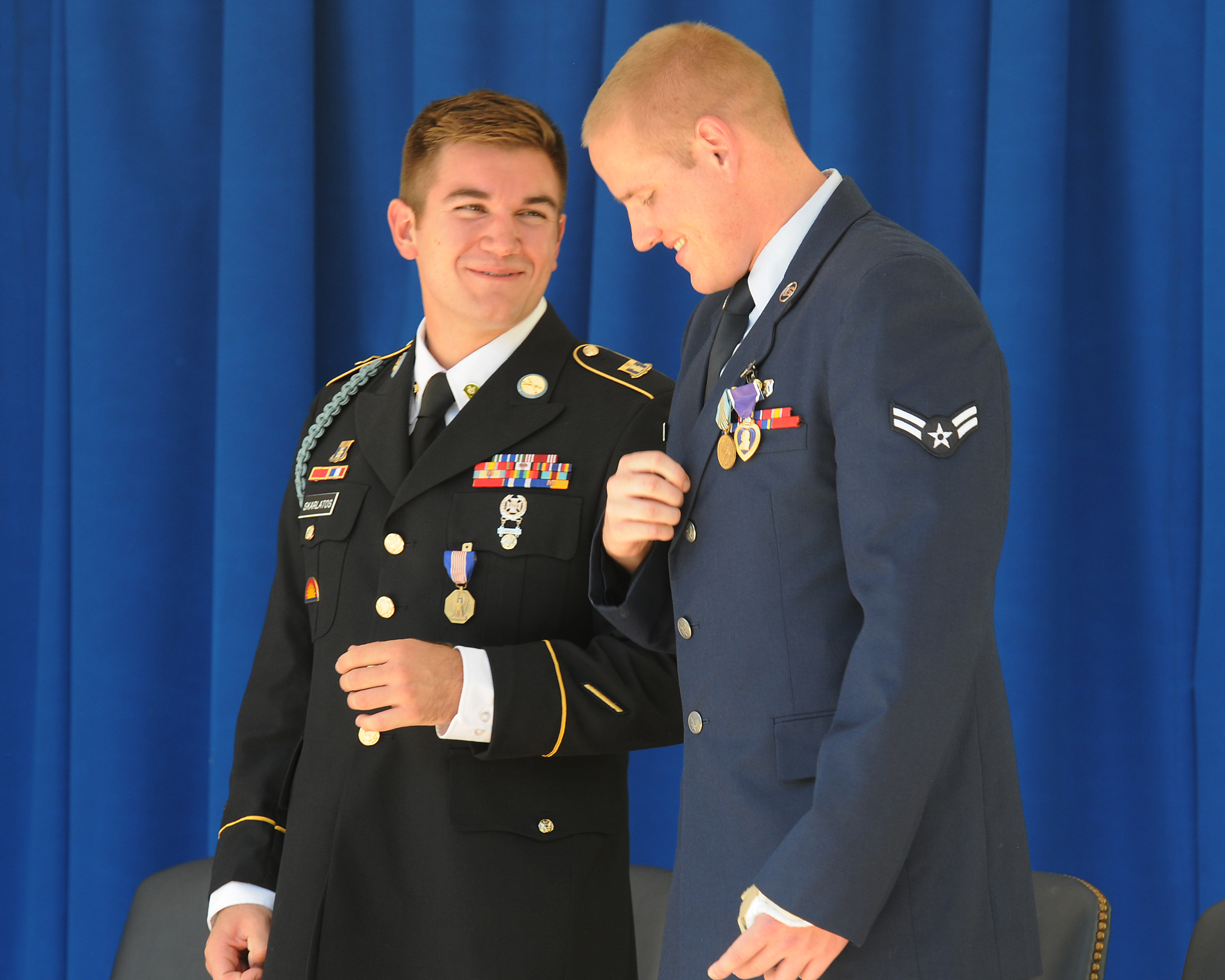
Stone (right) and childhood friend Alek Skarlatos (left) at a ceremony in The Pentagon courtyard in September 2015.

Tran made his first appearance in Sacramento County Superior Court on November 6, 2015, charged of the attempted murder of Stone with an allegation of using a dangerous weapon, the knife. He was ordered to be held without bail. Tran pleaded guilty. On May 12, 2017, he was sentenced to nine years in state prison. He was incarcerated at Folsom State Prison with a scheduled release date of May 2022.

== Personal life ==
In January 2016, Stone accepted First Lady Michelle Obama's invitation to attend Barack Obama's 2016 State of the Union Address. Stone "had a heartbreaking moment" when a daughter of one of the victims of the 2015 San Bernardino attack in San Bernardino, California, thanked him for his role in stopping the Thalys train attack; Stone giving her a hug in response. Stone, in response to the State of the Union Address, said "What I will walk away with ... is how the president said we are still a strong country ... he made it clear that we aren't dealing with a giant war, but with low-grade thugs," and finished by commenting "In the grand scheme, they can't bring us down." When asked which presidential candidate he supported in the 2016 United States presidential election, Stone declined to comment, wanting to maintain the public non-partisan stand of the military.

According to a decree published on September 20, 2018, Stone (along with Skarlatos and Sadler) were naturalized as citizens of France, and according to Le Monde retroactively to April 2018, when they applied for French nationality. On January 31, 2019, they attended a naturalization ceremony in Sacramento and received their naturalization certificates.

Stone competed with Sadler on the 33rd season of The Amazing Race. They completed three legs of the race before filming was shut down on February 28, 2020, due to the COVID-19 pandemic. When production resumed 19 months later in September 2021, Sadler and Stone, along with 3 other teams from their season, were unable to return to the race due to extenuating circumstances; in their case, a recent promotion at Sadler's work left him unable to take the required time off for filming.

== Bibliography ==
- The 15:17 To Paris (2016) (ISBN 978-1610397339)

== Filmography ==
Year	Title	Role	Notes
2016	Range 15	Himself	Veteran based zombie film
2016	Who Wants to Be a Millionaire	Himself	Contestant; paired with Anthony Sadler and Alek Skarlatos
2018	The 15:17 to Paris	Himself	Film based on the trio's memoir of the same title
2020	The Amazing Race	Himself	Contestant; paired with Anthony Sadler

== Awards and decorations ==
=== Awards ===
Year	Award Ceremony	Category	Result	Ref
2016	Spike Guys Choice Awards	Hero	Won	

=== Decorations ===

Basic Enlisted Medical Badge
Airman's Medal		Purple Heart
Outstanding Unit Award	Air Force Good Conduct Medal	National Defense Service Medal
Global War on Terrorism Service Medal	Air Force Overseas Short Tour Service Ribbon	NCO Professional Military Education Graduate Ribbon
Air Force Training Ribbon	Légion d'honneur (Chevalier) (France)	Civic Medal 1st class for bravery (Belgium)
