= Airman's Medal =

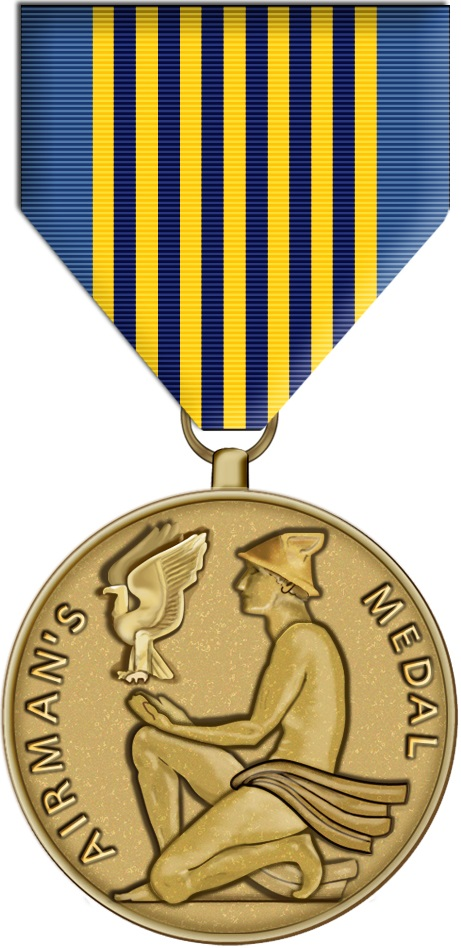
- Type: Military medal
- Awarded for: a heroic act, usually at the voluntary risk of his or her life but not involving actual combat
- Presented by: United States Department of the Air Force
- Eligibility: Members of the Armed Forces of the United States or of a friendly nation
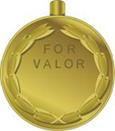
- Reverse
- Status: Currently awarded
- Established: 6 July 1960; Retroactive after 10 August 1956
- First award: 21 July 1960
- Service ribbon

Precedence
- Next (higher): Distinguished Flying Cross
- Equivalent: Army: Soldier's Medal; Naval Service: Navy and Marine Corps Medal; Coast Guard: Coast Guard Medal
- Next (lower): Bronze Star Medal

The Airman's Medal (AmnM) is a military award and decoration of the United States Air Force and United States Space Force for personnel who distinguish themselves by heroism involving voluntary risk of their life not involving actual combat with an armed enemy of the United States. The medal was established on 6 July 1960 by 10 U.S. Code 8750 and is awarded to those service members or those of a friendly nation while serving in any capacity with the U.S. Air Force or U.S. Space Force. The performance must have involved personal hazard or danger.

The Airman's Medal was authorized on 10 August 1956 to replace the U.S. Army's Soldier's Medal which had also been awarded to qualifying Air Force personnel since 26 September 1947. According to Air Force Instruction 36–2803, The Office of the Secretary of the Air Force, Personnel Council approves or disapproves recommendations for Airman's Medals requiring Secretary of the Air Force final approval and determines upon approval, entitlement to 10 percent increase in retirement pay for the Airman's Medal when awarded to enlisted members for extraordinary heroism.

The Airman's Medal is equivalent to the Army's Soldier's Medal, the Navy and Marine Corps Medal, and the Coast Guard Medal. Additional awards of the Airman's Medal are denoted by oak leaf clusters.

The first recipient of the Airman's Medal was Captain John Burger, U.S. Air Force, who was awarded the medal at MacDill Air Force Base, Florida, on 21 July 1960, for heroism performed on 9 September 1959.

== Design ==
The medal was designed and sculpted by Thomas Hudson Jones of the Army Institute of Heraldry. On the obverse of the circular medal is the figure of the Greek god Hermes, son of Zeus, resting on one knee. He has just released from his open hands an American Bald Eagle, shown rising into flight. Within the raised rim of the medal, is the inscription "Airman's Medal" in raised letters. The reverse of the medal, has a raised outer edge and bears the inscription: “For Valor” above a space for the recipient's name which is within a stylized laurel wreath open at the top and tied at the bottom.

The Airman's Medal is unique in that its shape does not follow the octagonal shape of its counterparts, the Soldier's Medal, Navy and Marine Corps Medal and the Coast Guard Medal. It had been established practice heretofore to design military decorations with a distinctive shape, so that they would not be confused at a distance with service or campaign medals, which are always circular in shape. The reason for this is because the design was originally approved for use as the Air Force Distinguished Service Medal.

== Notable recipients ==
- Paul K. Carlton Jr., for his rescuing several people after American Airlines Flight 77, which crashed into the Pentagon during the September 11 attacks
- Adam Kinzinger, for saving the life of a woman who was being attacked by her knife-wielding boyfriend.
- Michael Landsberry, for his actions during the 2013 Sparks Middle School shooting, including reasoning with the shooter and protecting several students.
- William H. Pitsenbarger for aiding and defending a unit of soldiers pinned down by an enemy assault during the Vietnam War. Before his death he helped save over 60 men in the battle.
- Spencer Stone, for disarming a terrorist during the 2015 Thalys train attack.
- Colonel Paul Sowada and Cadet 2nd Class Phillip Michael Sowada, who rescued three people from drowning off the beach at Vandenberg Air Force Base on Christmas Day, 1997. The three swimmers were caught in a dangerous rip tide and were being swept out to sea. They are also the only father/son duo to be awarded the medal for the same act of valor.
- Matthew La Porte , Cadet La Porte distinguished himself by heroism involving voluntary risk of life in Norris Hall on the campus of Virginia Polytechnic Institute and State University on 16 April 2007. On that day gunfire erupted in the hallway outside of Room 211 and the professor told her students to get down and to move to the back of the classroom to take cover behind desks, Cadet La Porte instead moved to the front of the room and barricaded the door with a large, heavy desk in an attempt to defend the class. When the shooter subsequently forced his way into the classroom, Cadet La Porte, with complete disregard for his own safety, unhesitatingly charged the shooter in an aggressive attempt to stop him, drawing heavy fire at close range, and sustaining seven gunshot wounds. Cadet La Porte's actions helped save lives by slowing down the shooter and by taking fire that would have been directed at his classmates.
