= The Amazing Race 33 =

Season of television series

- Season 33
- Region 1 DVD cover
- Presented by: Phil Keoghan
- No. of teams: 11
- Winner: Kim & Penn Holderness
- No. of legs: 11
- Distance traveled: 22,000 mi (35,000 km)
- No. of episodes: 11

Release
- Original network: CBS
- Original release: January 5 – March 2, 2022

Additional information
- Filming dates: Original: February 22 – February 28, 2020; Resumption: September 19 – October 6, 2021

Series chronology
- ← Previous; Season 32 Next → Season 34

The Amazing Race 33 is the thirty-third season of the American reality competition show The Amazing Race. Hosted by Phil Keoghan, it featured eleven teams of two, each with a pre-existing relationship, competing in a race around Europe to win US$1,000,000. Though filming started in February 2020, the COVID-19 pandemic caused production to be placed on hold for over a year and a half. The race resumed in September 2021 with most of the original teams and a modified route. This season visited two continents and seven countries and traveled over 22,000 miles (35,000 km) during eleven legs. Starting from the racers' homes in the United States, racers traveled through England and Scotland before production was suspended. After reuniting in St. Gallen, racers traveled through Switzerland, France, Greece, and Portugal before returning to the United States and finishing in Greater Los Angeles. An element of the show that returned for this season was having teams start from their homes instead of a centralized location. The season premiered on CBS on January 5, 2022, and concluded on March 2, 2022.

Married internet personalities Kim and Penn Holderness were the winners of this season, while flight attendants Raquel Moore and Cayla Platt finished in second place, and best friends Ryan Ferguson and Dusty Harris finished in third place.

== Format ==
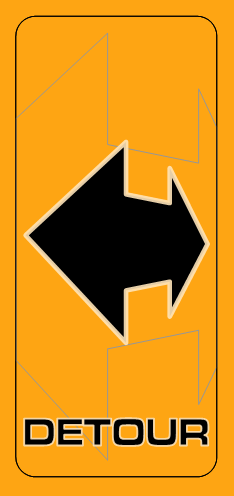
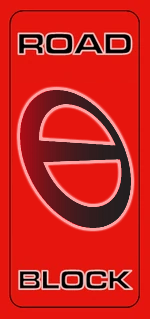
The clues which contestants receive during the course of the race generally fall into four categories: Route Info, Detour, and Roadblock.

The Amazing Race is a reality television show created by Bertram van Munster and Elise Doganieri, and hosted by Phil Keoghan. The series follows teams of two competing in a race around the world. Each leg of the race requires teams to deduce clues, navigate foreign environments, interact with locals, perform physical and mental challenges, and travel on a limited budget provided by the show. At each stop during the leg, teams receive clues inside sealed envelopes, which fall into one of these categories:

- Route Info: These are simple instructions that teams must follow before they can receive their next clue.
- Detour: A Detour is a choice between two tasks. Teams may choose either task and switch tasks if they find one option too difficult. There is usually one Detour present on each leg.
- Roadblock: A Roadblock is a task that only one team member can complete. Teams must choose which member will complete the task based on a brief clue they receive before fully learning the details of the task. There is usually one Roadblock present on each leg.

Most teams who arrive last at the Pit Stop of each leg are progressively eliminated, while the first team to arrive at the finish line in the final episode wins the grand prize of US$1,000,000.

== Contestants ==
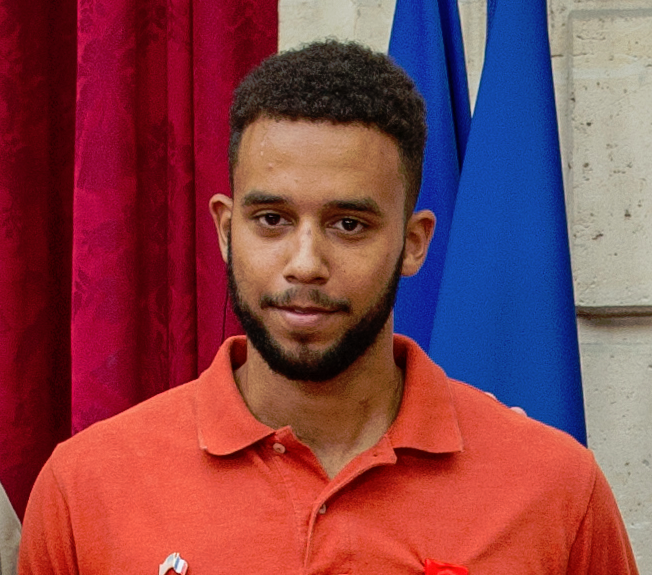
Anthony Sadler

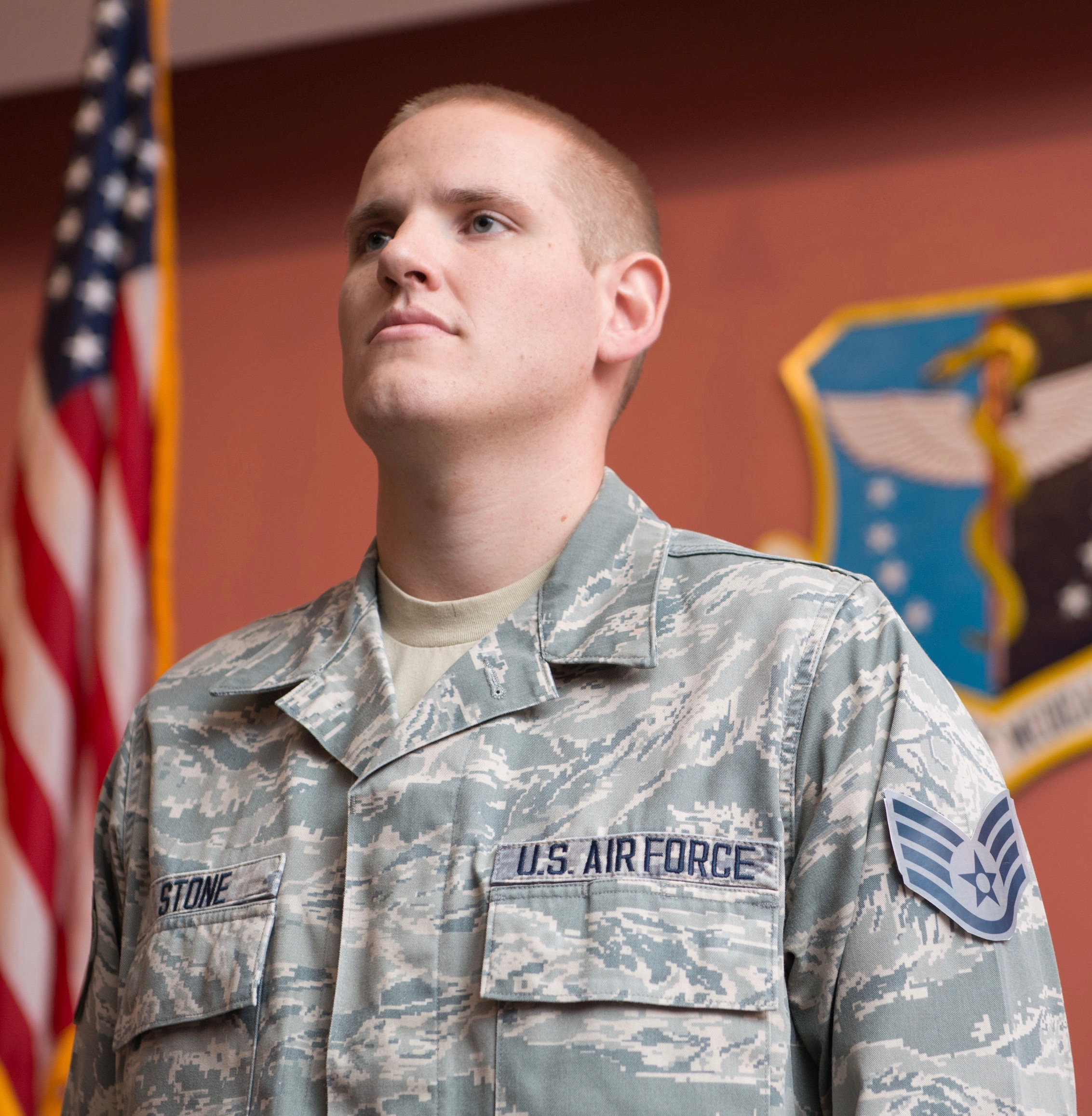
Spencer Stone

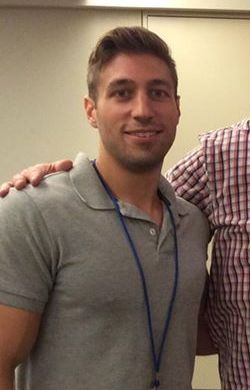
Ryan W. Ferguson

The cast was announced by CBS on December 10, 2021. The cast included Love Island season 1 couple Caro Viehweg and Ray Gantt; married internet personalities Kim and Penn Holderness; Buffalo Singing Cops duo Michael Norwood and Moe Badger; 2015 Thalys train attack heroes Anthony Sadler and Spencer Stone; and Ryan Ferguson, who spent ten years in prison after being wrongfully convicted.

Contestants	Age	Relationship	Hometown	Status
Michael Norwood	Returned to competition			Eliminated 1st (in London, England)
Moe Badger	Returned to competition			Eliminated 1st (in London, England)
Arun Kumar	Returned to competition			Eliminated 2nd (in Glasgow, Scotland)
Natalia Kumar	Returned to competition			Eliminated 2nd (in Glasgow, Scotland)
Taylor Green-Jones	38	Married	Fort Worth, Texas	Unable to return to competition
Isaiah Green-Jones	31	Married	Portland, Oregon	Unable to return to competition
Caro Viehweg	23	Dating	Los Angeles, California	Unable to return to competition
Ray Gantt	25	Dating	Lakewood, New Jersey	Unable to return to competition
Connie Greiner	37	Married	Newport News, Virginia	Unable to return to competition
Sam Greiner	39	Married	Charlotte, North Carolina	Unable to return to competition
Anthony Sadler	29	Childhood Friends	Sacramento, California	Unable to return to competition
Spencer Stone	29	Childhood Friends	Sacramento, California	Unable to return to competition
Michael Norwood	36	Singing Police Officers	Buffalo, New York	Eliminated 3rd (in Altstätten, Switzerland)
Moe Badger	42	Singing Police Officers	Buffalo, New York	Eliminated 3rd (in Altstätten, Switzerland)
Akbar Cook Sr.	45	Married Educators	Newark, New Jersey	Eliminated 4th (in Giuncaggio, France)
Sheri Cook	44	Married Educators	Havana, Florida	Eliminated 4th (in Giuncaggio, France)
Lulu Gonzalez	37	Twins & Radio Hosts	North Bergen, New Jersey	Eliminated 5th (in Nea Kallikrateia, Greece)
Lala Gonzalez	37	Twins & Radio Hosts	North Bergen, New Jersey	Eliminated 5th (in Nea Kallikrateia, Greece)
Arun Kumar	56	Father & Daughter	Detroit, Michigan	Eliminated 6th (in Cabo Espichel, Portugal)
Natalia Kumar	28	Father & Daughter	Detroit, Michigan	Eliminated 6th (in Cabo Espichel, Portugal)
Ryan Ferguson	37	Best Friends	Manhattan, New York	Third place
Dusty Harris	38	Best Friends	Columbia, Missouri	Third place
Raquel Moore	31	Flight Attendants	Chicago, Illinois	Runners-up
Cayla Platt	30	Flight Attendants	Gulf Breeze, Florida	Runners-up
Kim Holderness	45	Married	Sarasota, Florida	Winners
Penn Holderness	47	Married	Durham, North Carolina	Winners

Future appearances

Kim and Penn appeared on The Amazing Race: 25 Years Around the World.

In 2022, Caro Viehweg and Ray Gantt appeared on the fifth season of MTV's Ex on the Beach. Cayla Platt competed on the first season of The Challenge: USA. Dusty Harris competed on the second season of The Challenge: USA. In 2023, Gantt competed on Love Island Games. Lulu and Lala Gonzalez competed on Raid the Cage. In 2025, Gantt appeared on the third season of Perfect Match. In 2026, Arun Kumar competed on the second season of 99 to Beat.

== Contestant progress ==
The following teams are listed with their placements in each leg. Placements are listed in finishing order. Note that the race was suspended at the end of leg 3 due to the COVID-19 pandemic and resumed a year-and-a-half later.

- A red placement with a dagger (†) indicates that the team was eliminated.
- An italicized and underlined placement indicates that the team was the last to arrive, but there was no rest period at the Pit Stop and all teams were instructed to continue racing. There was no required Speed Bump task in the next leg.
- An underlined blue placement with a double-dagger (‡) indicates that the team was the last to arrive at a Pit Stop in a non-elimination leg, and was the only team to begin the subsequent leg in the final departure group.

Team placement (by leg)
Team	1	2	3	4	5	6	7	8	9	10	11
Kim & Penn	4th	5th	1st	2nd	3rd	1st	1st	1st	2nd	2nd	1st
Raquel & Cayla	3rd	4th	6th	3rd	4th	2nd	2nd	2nd	1st	1st	2nd
Ryan & Dusty	2nd	1st	2nd	1st	1st	3rd	3rd	3rd	4th‡	3rd	3rd
Arun & Natalia	9th	3rd	10th†	6th (Note: Anthony & Spencer, Caro & Ray, Connie & Sam, and Taylor & Isaiah were unable to return to The Amazing Race when filming resumed due to extenuating circumstances. As a result, Michael & Moe and Arun & Natalia re-entered the competition as replacement teams.)	6th‡	4th	5th‡	4th	3rd	4th†	
Lulu & Lala	10th	10th (Note: This team arrived last at the Pit Stop, but were instructed to continue racing.)	7th	4th	2nd	5th	4th	5th† (Note: Lulu & Lala initially arrived 1st, but had not completed the leg's final two tasks, having found the Pit Stop by chance. They were required go back and complete all of the remaining tasks before checking in. All of the other teams checked in during this time, dropping Lulu & Lala to last.)			
Akbar & Sheri	6th	8th	9th	5th	5th	6th†					
Michael & Moe	11th†			7th†							
Anthony & Spencer	1st	7th	3rd								
Connie & Sam	7th	2nd	4th								
Caro & Ray	5th	6th	5th								
Taylor & Isaiah	8th	9th	8th								

== Race summary ==
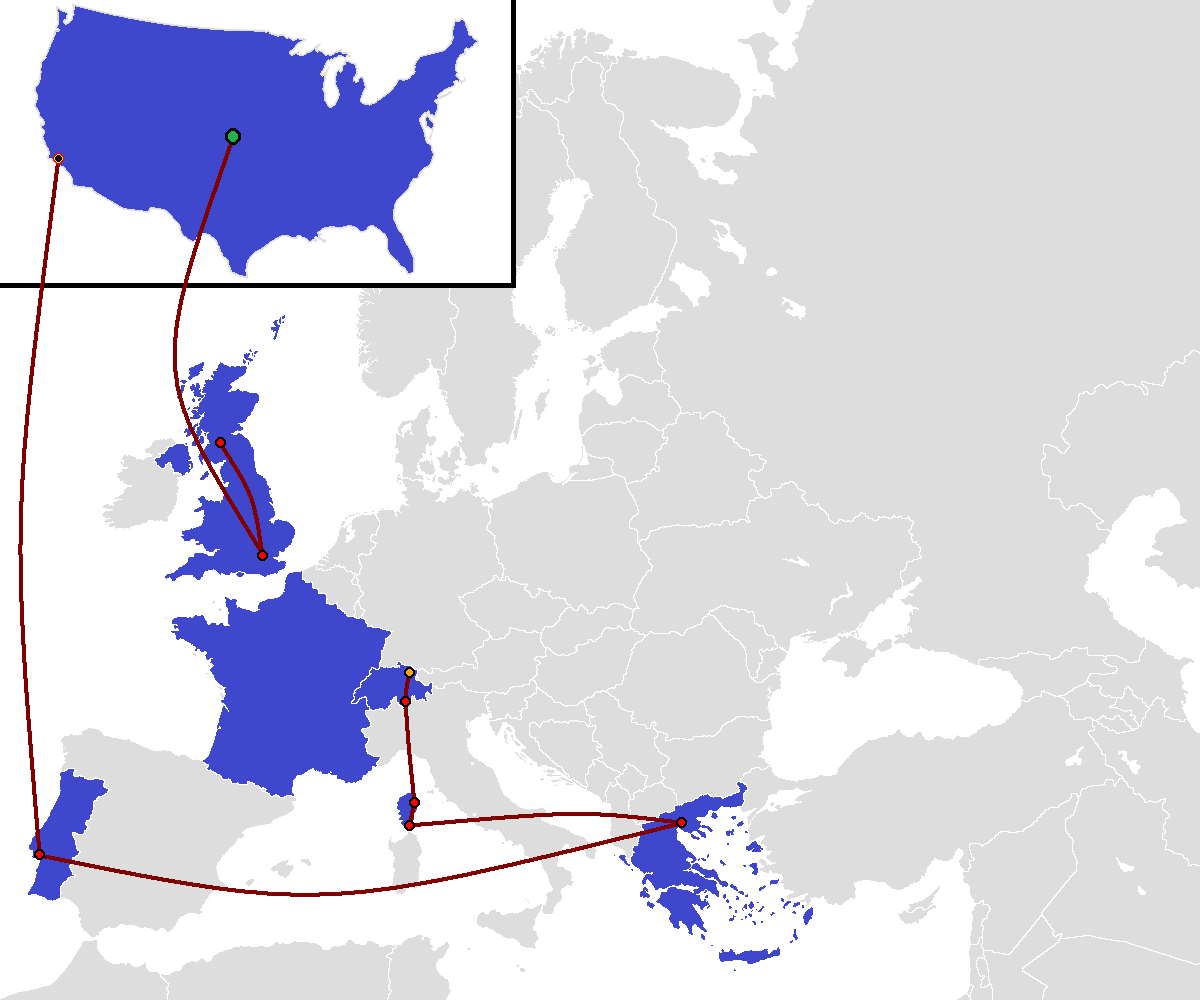
The route of The Amazing Race 33. The route stopped in Glasgow, Scotland, when filming was suspended, and restarted in St. Gallen, Switzerland.

Destinations	Air travel Rail travel Water travel Bus travel Helicopter travel Bicycle travel Gondola travel
Route Markers	Detour Roadblock Speed Bump Pit Stop

=== Leg 1 (United States → England) ===
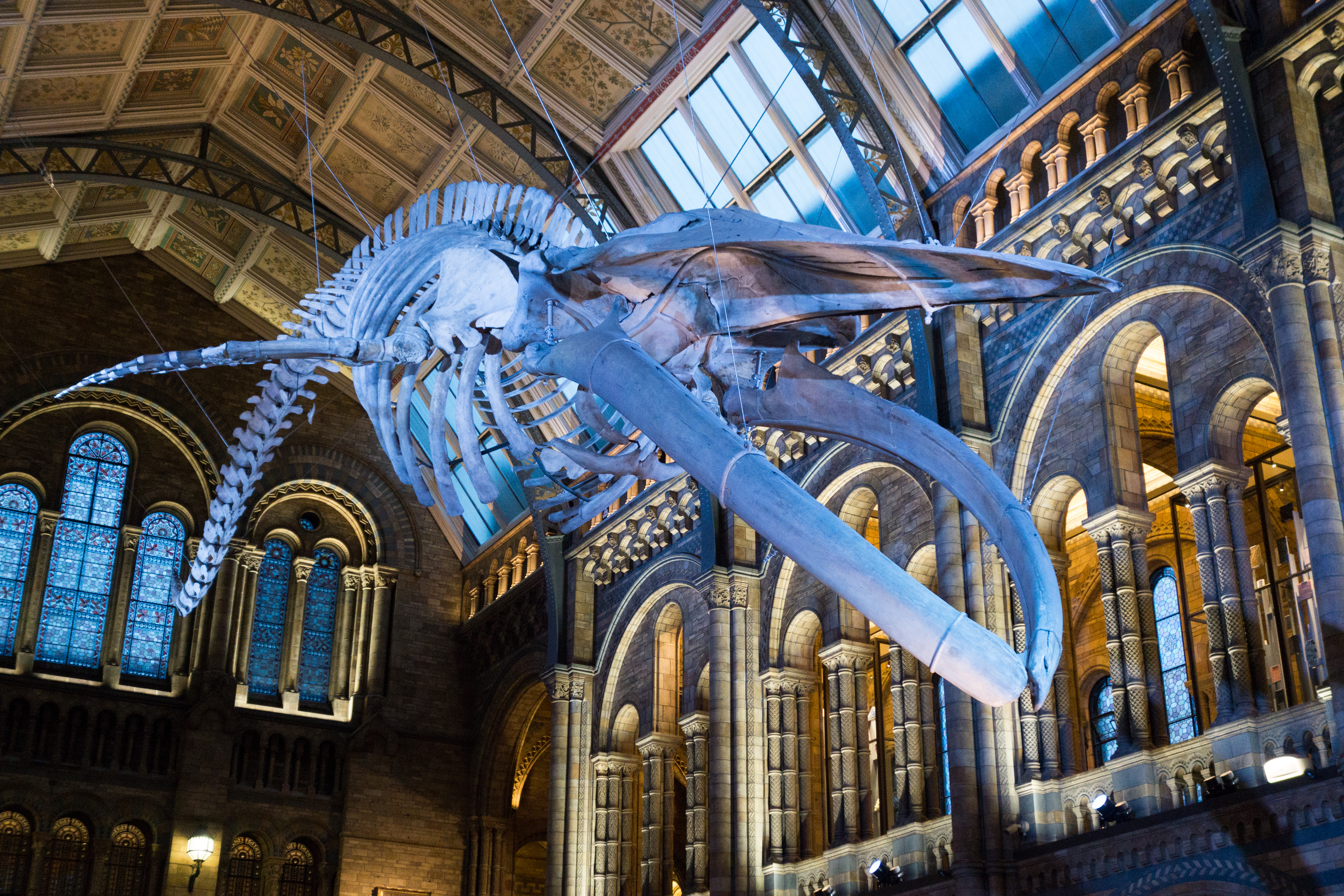
Beneath the blue whale skeleton in London's Natural History Museum, teams found the season's first Pit Stop.

- Episode 1: "We're Back!" (January 5, 2022)
- Prize: A trip for two to the Turks and Caicos Islands (awarded to Anthony & Spencer)
- Eliminated: Michael & Moe

Locations

- Assorted Cities (Teams' Homes) (Start)
- New York City, New York or Los Angeles, California or Charlotte, North Carolina or Chicago, Illinois → London, England
- London (Trafalgar Square)
- London (Buckingham Palace – Canada Gate)
- London (South Molton Street – Mess Hall at Immersive LDN or Parliament Square, Little Ben & Piccadilly Station)
- London (Soho – The Chipping Forecast)
- London (Natural History Museum)

Episode summary

- Instead of a traditional starting line, teams received a video message from Phil Keoghan at their homes informing them of the start of race. Teams had to fly from their local airports to London, England, travel to Trafalgar Square, and find one of four men dressed as a red telephone box with their first clue. They were then instructed to travel by foot down The Mall to Buckingham Palace, where they found their next clue.
- This season's first Detour was a choice between Artist Den or Digiben. In Artist Den, teams had to properly paste a 36-piece Banksy-style poster to a wall in order to receive their next clue. In Digiben, teams had to find a bobby in Parliament Square by Big Ben, then find a promoter by Little Ben, who sent them to DJ Digiben in Piccadilly Circus tube station, who had their next clue.
- After the Detour, teams had to find "The Queen and Boris Johnson having a nosh" (a pair of impersonators) at The Chipping Forecast in order to receive their next clue, which directed them to the Pit Stop beneath the blue whale skeleton at the Natural History Museum.

=== Leg 2 (England) ===
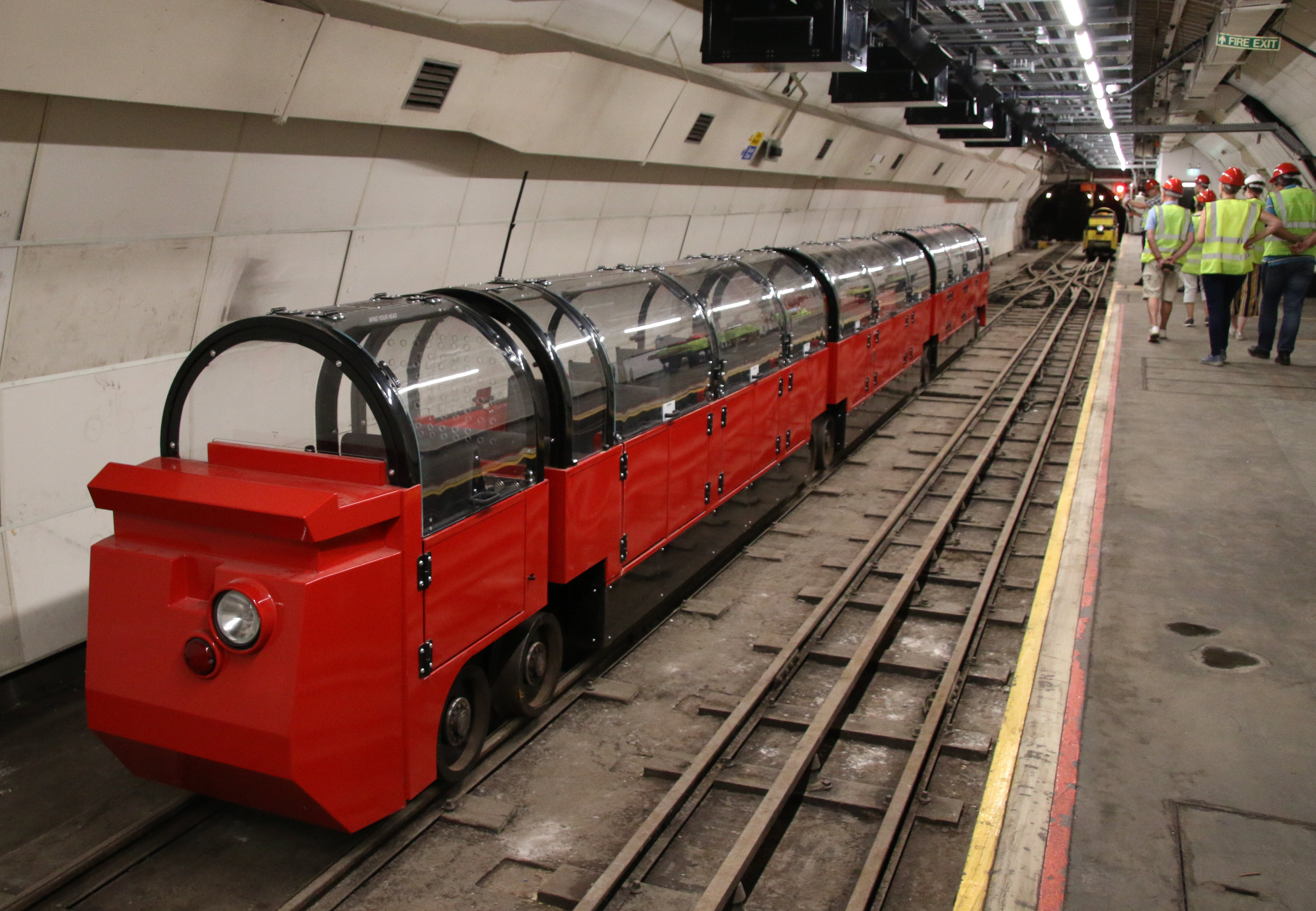
The Roadblock during the second leg in England was set in the Mail Rail.

- Episode 2: "It Can't Be That Easy" (January 5, 2022)

Locations

- London (Postal Museum – Mail Rail)
- London (Leicester Square)
- London (Flight Club Shoreditch or Mange)
- London (Russell Square Metro Station – Double-Decker Bus)

Episode summary

- At the start of this leg, teams had to travel to the Postal Museum in London in order to find their next clue.
- In this season's first Roadblock, one team member had to ride a train along the Mail Rail to a loading dock and sort through a bin filled with packages and envelopes in order to find their next clue.
- After the Roadblock, teams had to travel to Leicester Square, where they found their next clue.
- This leg's Detour was a choice between Bullseye, Mate or Decorate. In Bullseye, Mate, both team members had to score a bullseye on a dartboard in the same round in order to receive their next clue. In Decorate, teams were presented with twelve cakes decorated like the flags of various countries. Teams had to determine which two flags belonged to countries that were part of the European Union (France and Germany) and then replicate the two cakes in order to receive their next clue.
- Teams had to check in at the Pit Stop on a double-decker bus at the Russell Square Metro Station.

Additional notes

- After the Detour, teams had to climb to the top of the ArcelorMittal Orbit in order to receive their next clue. This task was unaired.
- There was no elimination at the end of this leg; all teams were instead directed to continue racing.
- Legs 1 and 2 aired back-to-back as a special two-hour episode.

=== Leg 3 (England → Scotland) ===
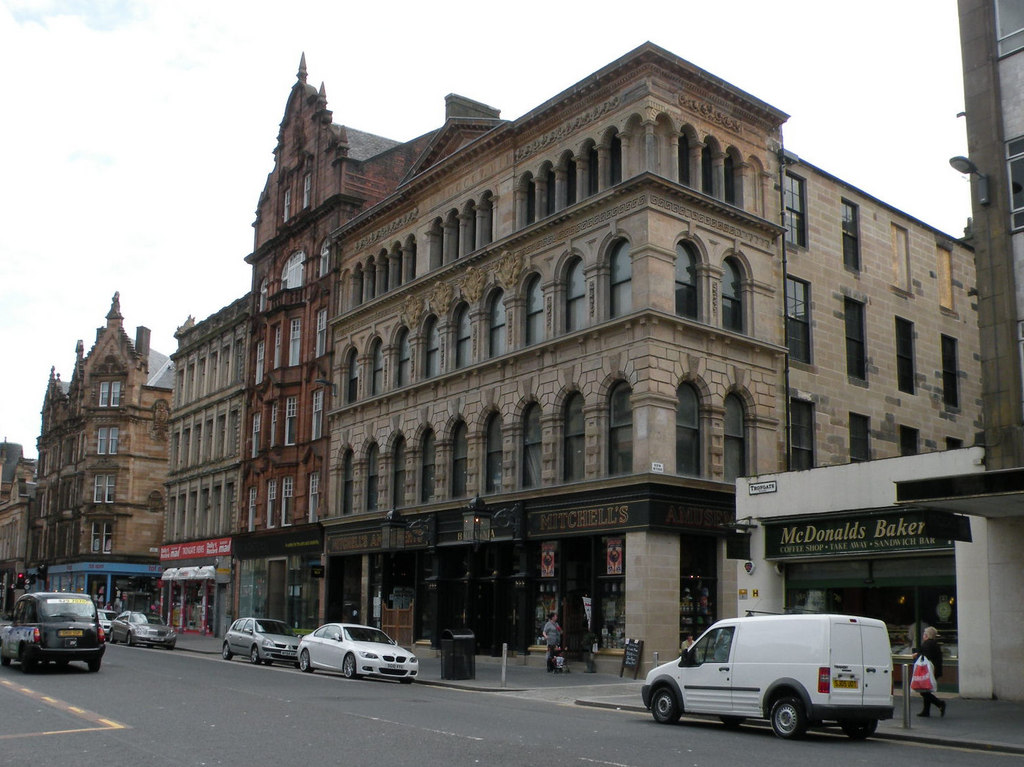
One Detour option in Glasgow had teams sing at the Britannia Music Hall.

- Episode 3: "Who Has This One in the Bag?" (January 12, 2022)
- Prize: A trip for two to Cape Cod, Massachusetts (awarded to Kim & Penn)
- Eliminated: Arun & Natalia

Locations

- London → Glasgow, Scotland
- Glasgow (Glasgow Central Station – NCP Car Park)
- Glasgow (Òran Mór)
- Glasgow (Alexandra Park – Saracen Fountain)
- Glasgow (Britannia Panopticon Music Hall or Fishers Cooperage)
- Glasgow (University of Glasgow Cloisters)

Episode summary

- At the start of this leg, teams were instructed to travel on an overnight Caledonian Sleeper train to Glasgow, Scotland, where they found their next clue on the windshield of a marked vehicle at NCP Car Park. Teams had to drive to Òran Mór in order to find their next clue.
- In this leg's Roadblock, one team member had to assemble a set of bagpipes and then play a drone alongside the Johnstone Pipe Band for the length of the Scottish national anthem in order to receive their next clue.
- After the Roadblock, teams had to find their next clue at the Saracen Fountain in Alexandra Park.
- This leg's Detour was a choice between Kilt or Rebuilt. In Kilt, teams had to learn and perform the song "Donald Where's Your Troosers?" in Highland dress in order to receive their next clue. In Rebuilt, teams had to remove the top two metal hoops from two whisky barrels, hammer a new head into each barrel's croze, and then replace the hoops in order to receive their next clue.
- After the Detour, teams had to check in at the Pit Stop: the University of Glasgow.

Additional notes

- After arriving in Scotland, teams had to drive to Culag Lochside Guest House on the shores of Loch Lomond and use a mallet to pop a bung out of a barrel in order to retrieve their next clue. This task was unaired.
- At the end of the leg, Phil Keoghan gathered all of the teams at the Pit Stop to announce that production of the race was suspended on account of the COVID-19 pandemic and all teams were sent home.

=== Leg 4 (Switzerland) ===
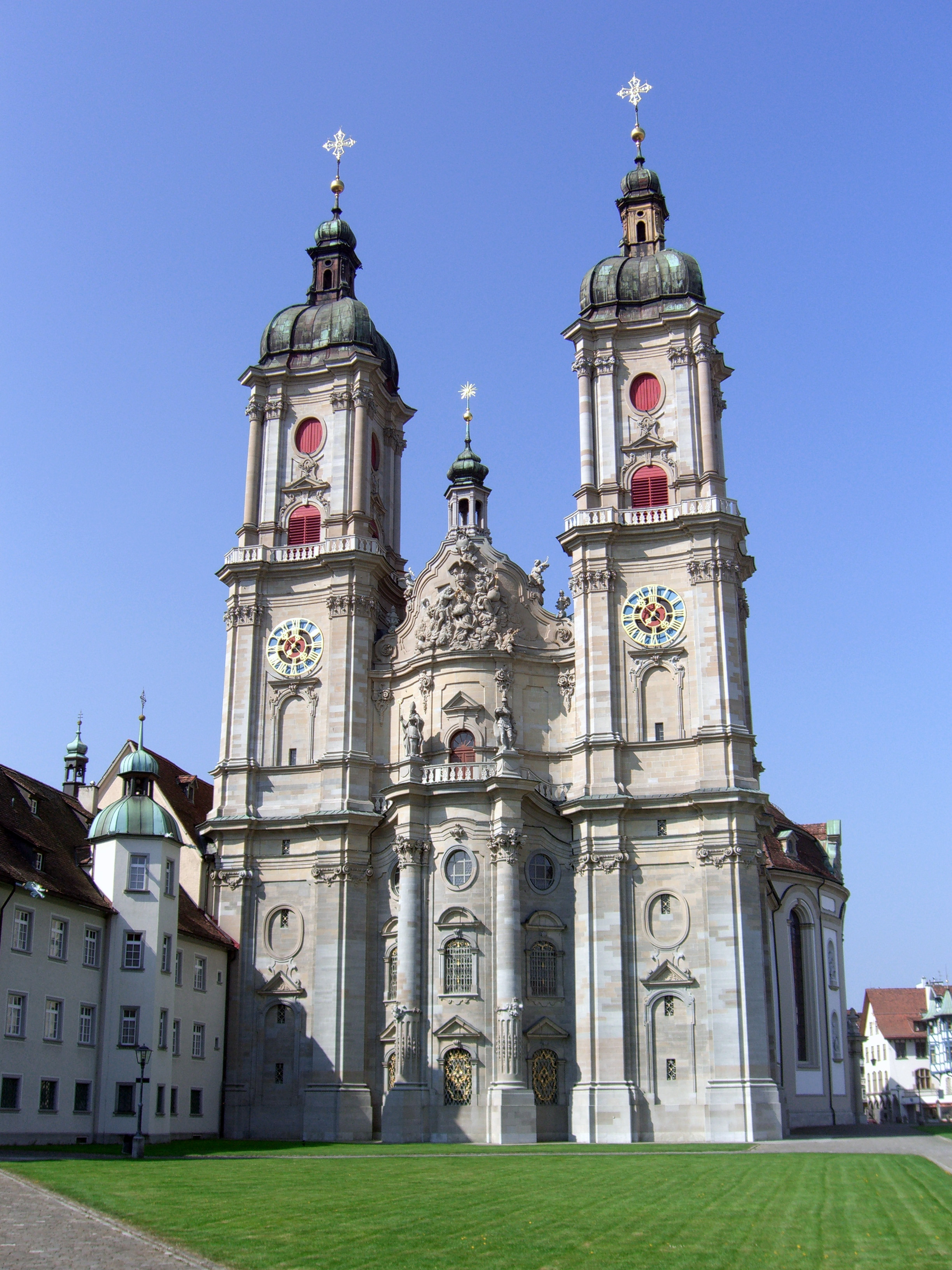
Teams gathered outside St. Gallen Cathedral to restart The Amazing Race 33.

- Episode 4: "Ready to Restart the Race" (January 19, 2022)
- Prize: US$2,500 each (awarded to Ryan & Dusty)
- Eliminated: Michael & Moe

Locations

- St. Gallen, Switzerland (St. Gallen Cathedral) (Restarting Line)
- St. Gallen (Museumstrasse) → Hundwil (Schwägalp Pass)
- Hundwil (Säntis)
- Urnäsch (Gasthaus Sonne)
- Urnäsch (Frehner Farm or Schulanlage AU)
- Altstätten (Marktgasse)

Episode summary

- After a nineteen-month break in filming, teams gathered outside St. Gallen Cathedral in St. Gallen, Switzerland, to resume the race. Anthony & Spencer, Caro & Ray, Connie & Sam, and Taylor & Isaiah were unable to rejoin production, while Michael & Moe and Arun & Natalia, who had been originally eliminated before production was suspended, were brought back to rejoin the race.
- At the start of this leg, teams had to search the Museumstrasse for one of three buses to the Schwägalp Pass, where they had to take a cable car to the summit of the Säntis in order to find their next clue.
- In this leg's Roadblock, one team member had to navigate a via ferrata to their next clue.
- After the Roadblock, teams had to drive to Gasthaus Sonne in Urnäsch in order to find their next clue.
- This leg's Detour was a choice between Punch It or Toss It. In Punch It, teams had to attach ornaments to a Swiss belt in a specific order in order to receive their next clue. In Toss It, teams had to learn and correctly perform a Swiss flag throwing routine known as Fahnenschwingen in order to receive their next clue.
- Teams had to check in at the Pit Stop: the Marktgasse in Altstätten.

Additional note

- Michael & Moe and Arun & Natalia had to complete a Speed Bump after the Detour that involved one team member running inside a ball resembling a cabbage while being directed by their partner to knock down haystacks before they could continue racing. This task was unaired.

=== Leg 5 (Switzerland) ===
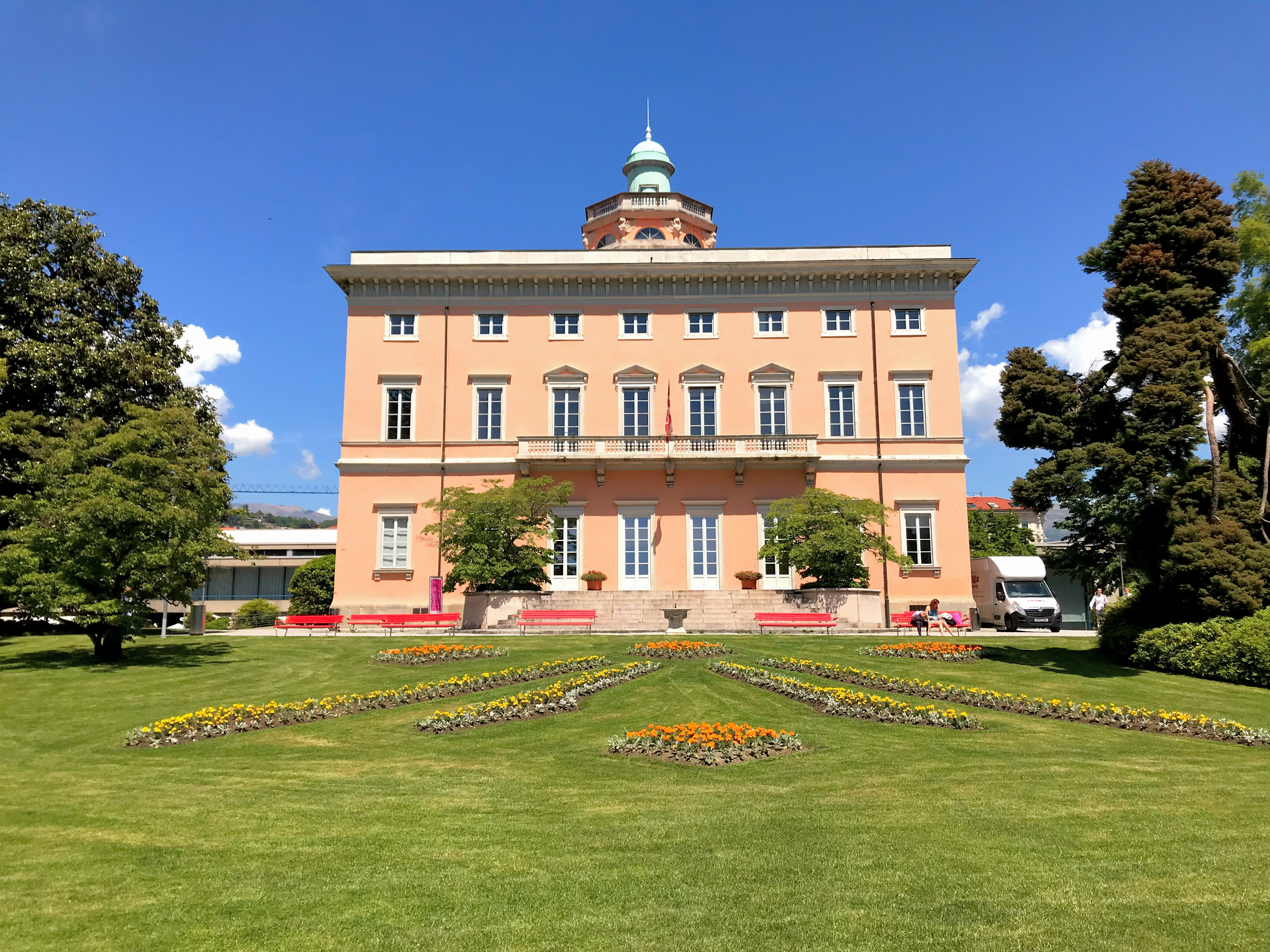
Parco Ciani in the lakeside city of Lugano served as the fifth Pit Stop.

- Episode 5: "Stairway to Hell" (January 26, 2022)
- Prize: A trip for two to Dominica (awarded to Ryan & Dusty)

Locations

- Altstätten (Marktgasse)
- Tenero-Contra (Verzasca Dam)
- Lugano (Piazza Carlo Battaglini)
- Lugano (Salita degli Angioli or Gabbani Salumeria)
- Lugano (Parco Ciani)

Episode summary

- At the start of this leg, teams departed from Altstätten in groups 15 minutes apart based on the order of their arrival at the previous Pit Stop.
- This leg's Roadblock was a Switchback from season 14, where one team member had to perform a 722-foot (220 m) bungee jump off of the Verzasca Dam along with their Travelocity Roaming Gnome in order to receive a satchel with a miniature clue.
- After the Roadblock, teams had to find their next clue at the Piazza Carlo Battaglini in Lugano.
- This leg's Detour was a choice between Bartender Race or Sausage Encase. In Bartender Race, teams had to deliver twelve bottles of wine and twelve bags of chestnuts from street vendors to a cocktail party atop the Salita degli Angioli stairway in order to receive their next clue. In Sausage Encase, teams had to squeeze out nine feet (2.7 m) of luganighetta sausage, and then divide it into four coiled portions in order to receive their next clue.
- After the Detour, teams had to retrieve a photograph from their gnome's satchel and figure out that it depicted the Pit Stop: Parco Ciani.

Additional note

- This was a non-elimination leg.

=== Leg 6 (Switzerland → France) ===
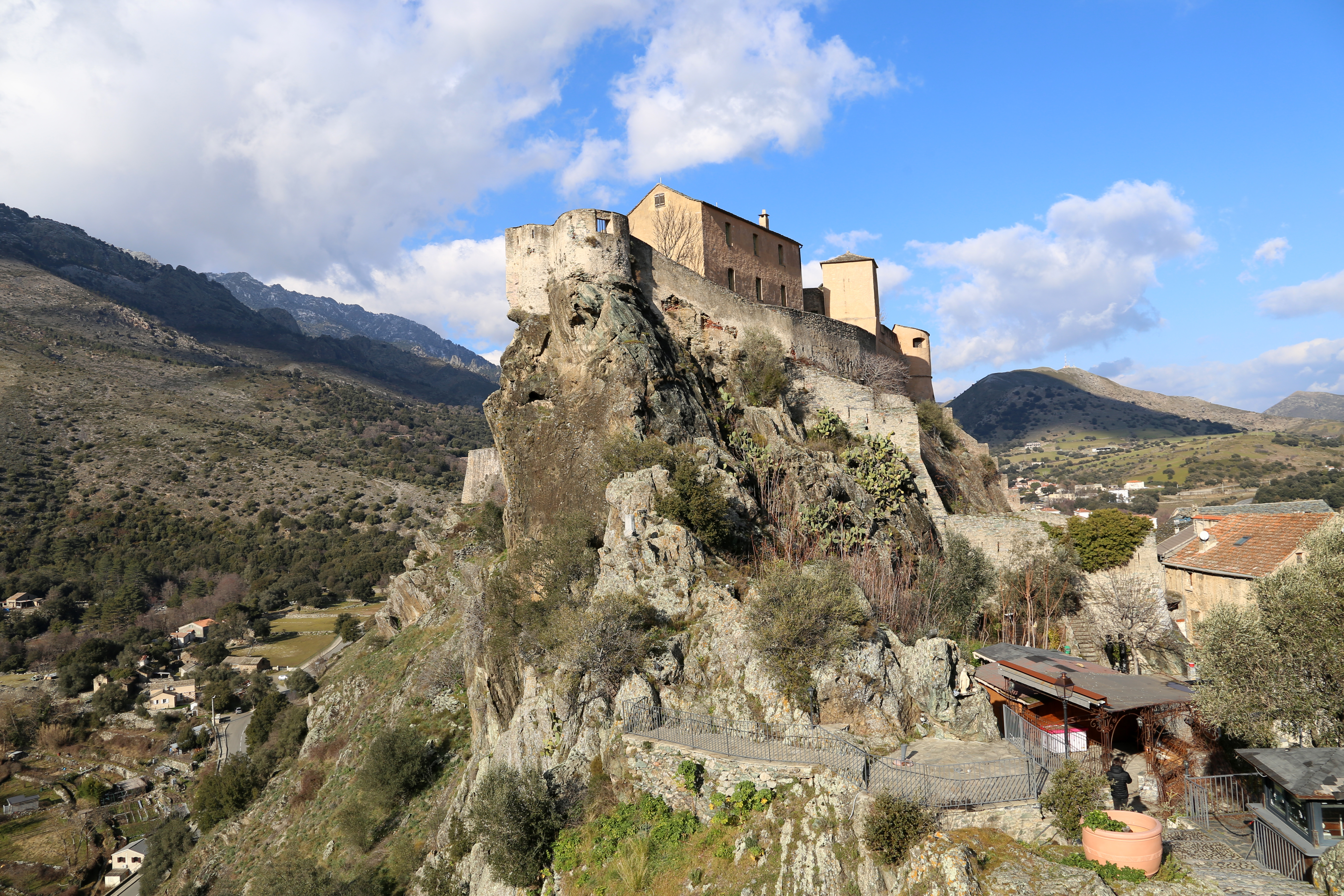
Once in Corsica, teams traveled to the commune of Corte.

- Episode 6: "Say Cheese" (February 2, 2022)
- Prize: US$5,000 each (awarded to Kim & Penn)
- Eliminated: Akbar & Sheri

Locations

- Milan, Italy → Bastia, France
- Castello-di-Rostino (Ponte Novu)
- Corte (Belvédère de Corte)
- Corte (Fromagerie Fermière Chez Jean Paul & Claire)
- Venaco (Verghellu Canyon Altipiani)
- Giuncaggio (Cardiccia Dam → Camping Ernella)

Episode summary

- During the Pit Stop, teams were flown to Corsica and began the next leg at the Ponte Novu. Teams departed in groups 15 minutes apart based on the order of their arrival at the previous Pit Stop. Teams had to drive to Belvédère de Corte and find their next clue and a canister of goat milk, which they needed for the Detour.
- This leg's Detour was a choice between Say Cheese or Mule, Please. In Say Cheese, teams had to make three baskets of cheese and then deliver them to a storage cave in order to receive their next clue. In Mule, Please, teams had to properly strap a harness to a mule and then deliver two milk canisters to the fromagerie without spilling any of the milk in order to receive their next clue.
- After the Detour, teams had to drive to Verghellu Canyon Altipiani in order to find their next clue.
- In this leg's Roadblock, one team member had to go canyoning through a 1.5-mile (2.4 km) river course in order to find their next clue.
- After the Roadblock, teams had to inflate a kayak and then paddle up the Tavignano River to the Pit Stop at the Cardiccia Dam.

=== Leg 7 (France) ===
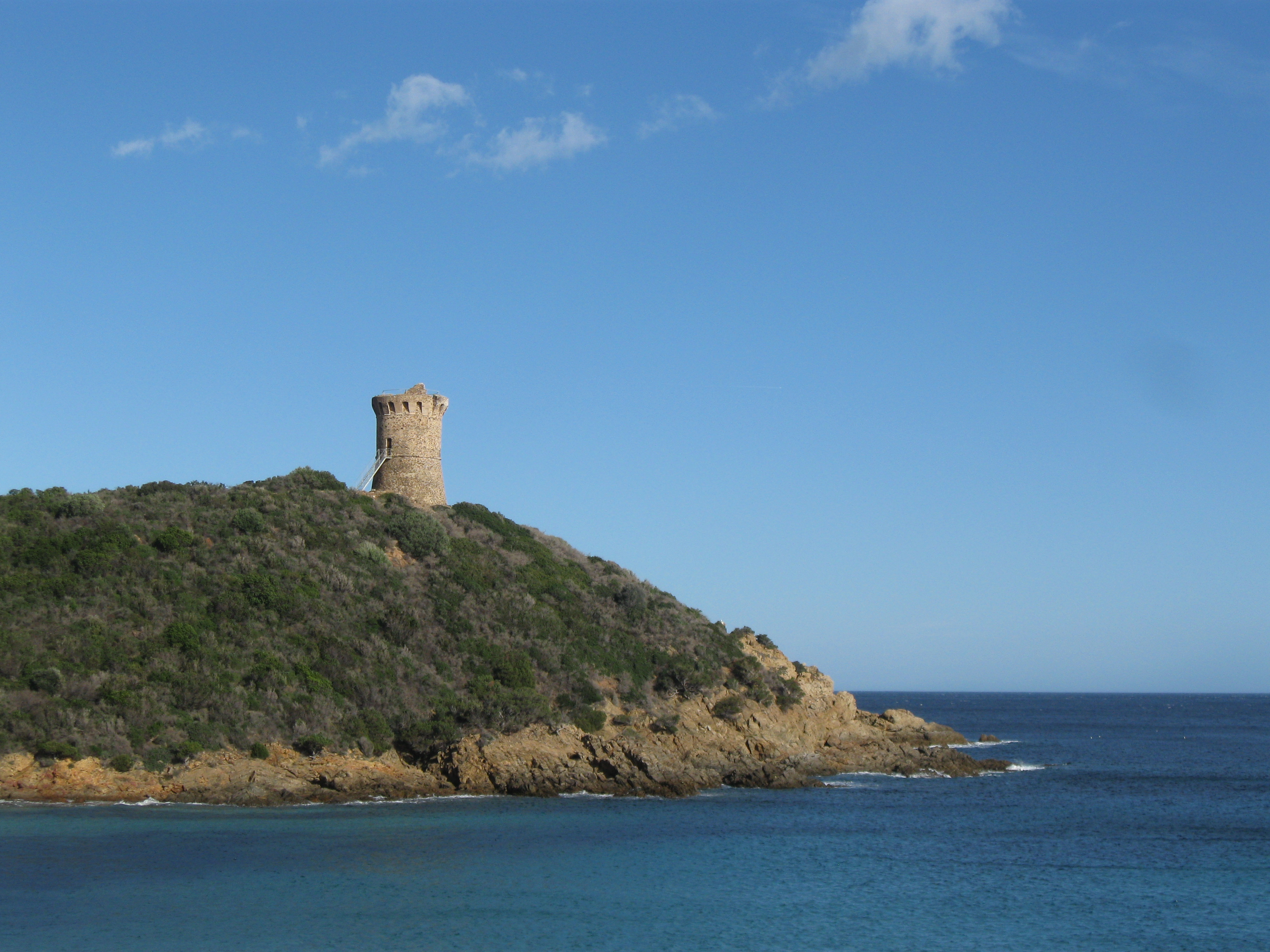
During their second leg in France, teams ate casu marzu by the Tour de Fautea.

- Episode 7: "Gently Down the Stream" (February 9, 2022)
- Prize: A trip for two to Antalya, Turkey (awarded to Kim & Penn)

Locations

- Giuncaggio (Camping Ernella)
- Zonza (Tour de Fautea)
- Pinarello (Pinarello Beach)
- Bonifacio (Port de Plaisance)
- Bonifacio (U Rastello)
- Bonifacio (Bonifacio Cliffs)

Episode summary

- At the start of this leg, teams were instructed to drive to the Tour de Fautea in Zonza, where both team members had to eat a piece of bread with casu marzu (cheese containing maggots) in order to receive their next clue. Teams departed in groups 15 minutes apart based on the order of their arrival at the previous Pit Stop.
- This leg's Detour was a choice between Row, Row, Row Your Boat or Gently Down the Stream. In Row, Row, Row Your Boat, teams had to paddle a transparent kayak into the Mediterranean Sea and retrieve ten matching metal fish in order to receive their next clue. In Gently Down the Stream, teams had to take a 15-minute cruise on a glass-bottom boat, look for ten metal fish, and then find a chart with the same sequence of fish at the dive shop in order to receive their next clue.
- After the Detour, teams had to drive to Port de Plaisance in Bonifacio in order to find their next clue.
- In this leg's Roadblock, one team member had to repair the holes in a fishing net in order to receive their next clue.
- After the Roadblock, teams had to search U Rastello for a Napoleon impersonator, who directed them to the Pit Stop at the Bonifacio Cliffs.

Additional note

- This was a non-elimination leg.

=== Leg 8 (France → Greece) ===
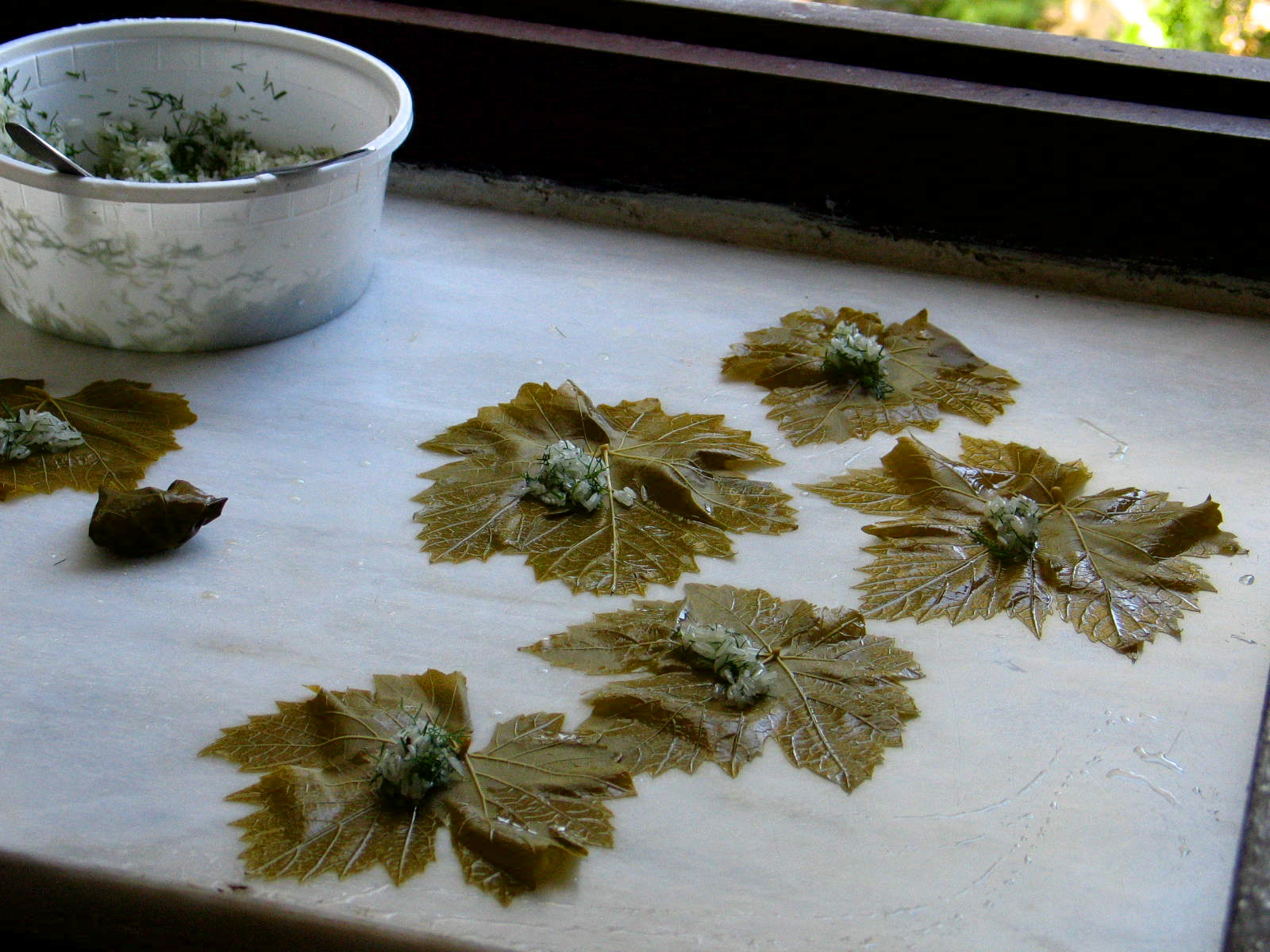
The first Roadblock in Halkidiki had racers making dolmades.

- Episode 8: "Souvlaki" (February 16, 2022)
- Prize: US$7,500 each (awarded to Kim & Penn)
- Eliminated: Lulu & Lala

Locations

- Figari → Thessaloniki, Greece
- Thermaikos (Peraia Beach)
- Nea Gonia (Konstantinos Olive Grove)
- Nea Gonia (Marianna's Vineyard)
- Heraklea (Heraklea Beach – Mamo's Kantina Stand)
- Heraklea (Saint George Church)
- Nea Kallikrateia (Nea Kallikrateia Pier)

Episode summary

- During the Pit Stop, teams were flown to Thessaloniki, Greece, and began the next leg at Peraia Beach. Teams departed in groups 15 minutes apart based on the order of their arrival at the previous Pit Stop. Teams had to drive to Konstantinos Olive Grove and search among the olive trees for their next clue directing them to Marianna's Vineyard.
- In this leg's first Roadblock, one team member had to properly make 60 dolmades in order to receive their next clue.
- After the first Roadblock, teams had to drive to Mamo's Kantina Stand, order the dish of the day (souvlaki), spell its name, and then eat it before finding their next clue on the wrapper, which directed them to Saint George Church.
- In this leg's second Roadblock, the team member who did not perform the previous Roadblock had to listen to a 15-minute sermon from a Greek Orthodox priest, who listed facts about ten Eastern Orthodox saints. They were then asked five questions about what they'd heard and had to answer correctly in order to receive their next clue, which directed them to the Pit Stop: the Nea Kallikrateia Pier.

=== Leg 9 (Greece) ===
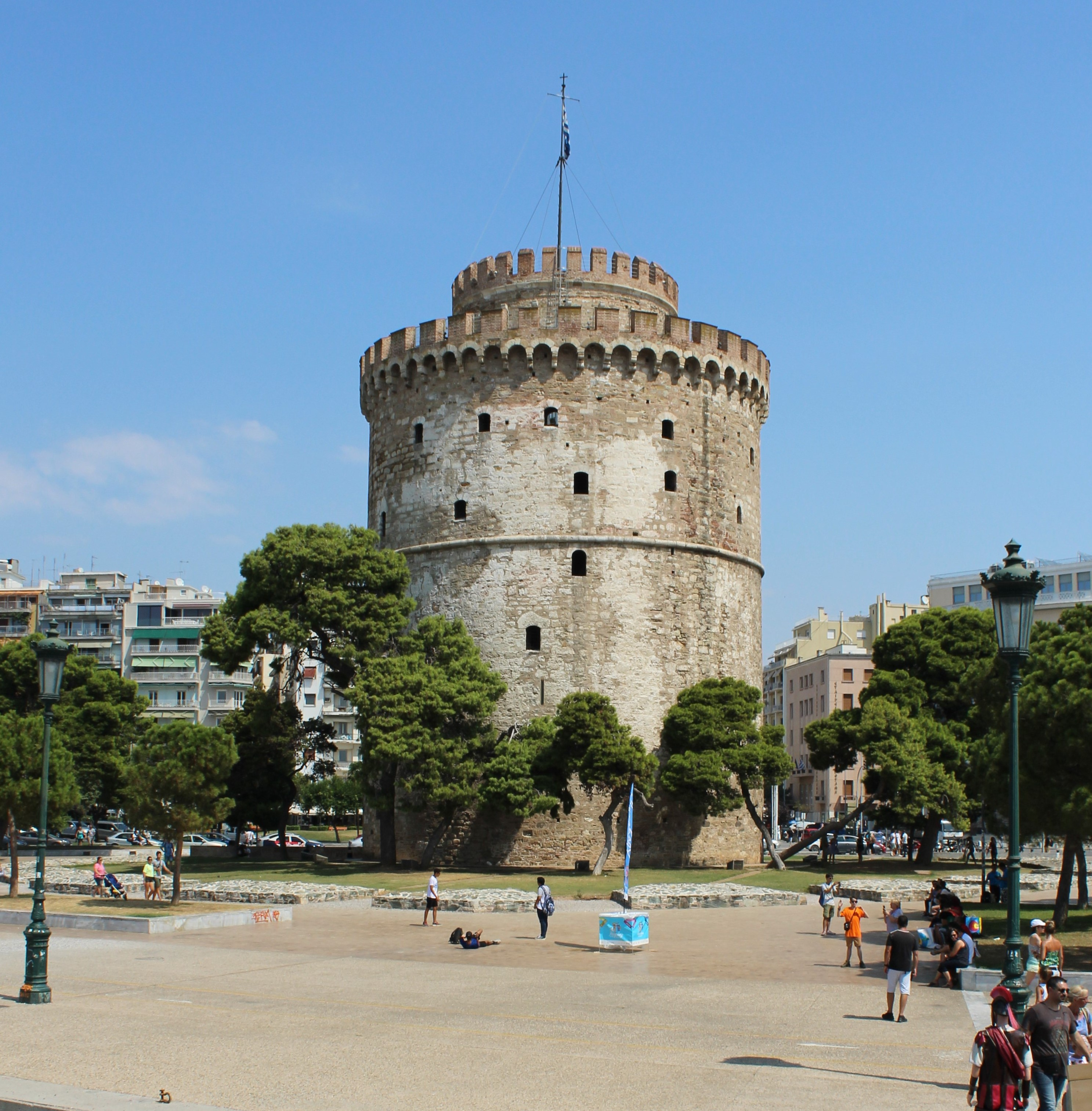
The White Tower of Thessaloniki was the location of this season's ninth Pit Stop.

- Episode 9: "Rock Bottom" (February 23, 2022)
- Prize: A trip for two to Kauaʻi, Hawaii (awarded to Raquel & Cayla)

Locations

- Nea Kallikrateia (Nea Kallikrateia Pier)
- Thessaloniki (Theatro Dassous)
- Thessaloniki (Trigonion Tower)
- Thessaloniki (Cafe Jasmine)
- Thessaloniki (White Tower)

Episode summary

- At the start of this leg, teams were instructed to drive to the Theatro Dassous in Thessaloniki. Teams departed in groups 15 minutes apart based on the order of their arrival at the previous Pit Stop.
- In this leg's Roadblock, one team member had to turn over stones until they found one of four gold coins that they could exchange with an Oracle of Delphi impersonator for their next clue.
- After the Roadblock, teams had to listen to words of wisdom from a Socrates impersonator at the Trigonion Tower before receiving their next clue.
- This season's final Detour was a choice between Bring 'Em or Break 'Em. In Bring 'Em, teams would have delivered 300 plates uphill to the Cafe Jasmine in order to receive a miniature clue from the restaurant owner. In Break 'Em, team members had to alternate breaking plates while a band played until they found a miniature clue. All teams chose Break 'Em.
- After the Detour, teams had to check in at the Pit Stop: the White Tower of Thessaloniki, where they were greeted with words of wisdom from a Diogenes the Cynic impersonator.

Additional note

- This was a non-elimination leg.

=== Leg 10 (Greece → Portugal) ===
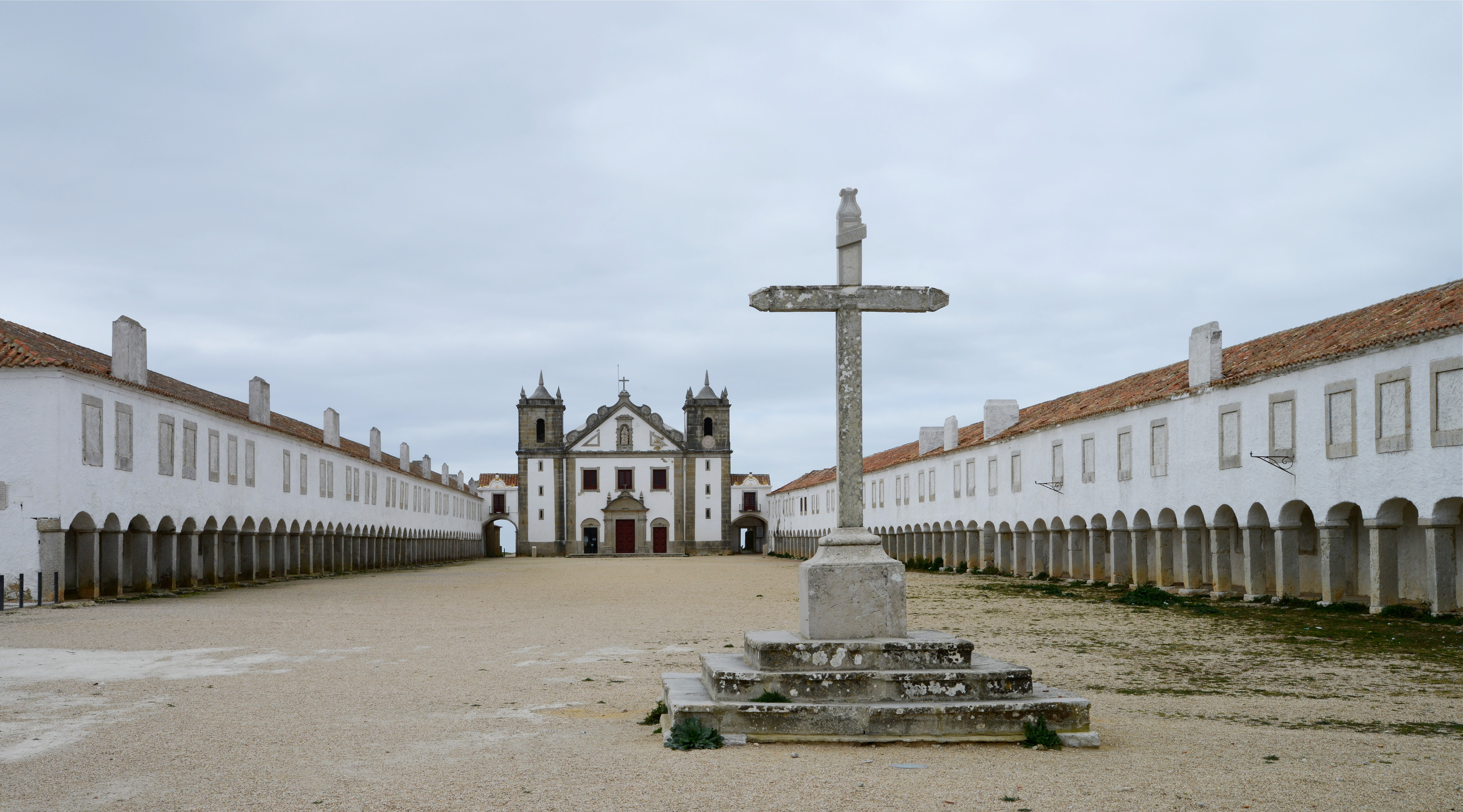
Teams encountered their second Roadblock in Portugal at the Santuário de Cabo Espichel.

- Episode 10: "No Room For Error" (March 2, 2022)
- Prize: A trip for two to Saint Lucia (awarded to Raquel & Cayla)
- Eliminated: Arun & Natalia

Locations

- Thessaloniki → Lisbon, Portugal
- Almada (Sanctuary of Christ the King)
- Setúbal (Fortaleza de São Filipe)
- Setúbal (Fisherman's Wharf)
- Setúbal (Mercearia Confiança de Troino & Rua Vasco da Gama)
- Cabo Espichel (Santuário de Cabo Espichel)
- Cabo Espichel (Farol de Cabo Espichel)

Episode summary

- During the Pit Stop, teams were flown to Lisbon, Portugal, and began the next leg at the Sanctuary of Christ the King. Teams were instructed to drive to the Fortaleza de São Filipe, where they had to climb to the top of the fort, search for an Amazing Race flag, and then drive to its location in order to find their next clue. Teams departed in groups 15 minutes apart based on the order of their arrival at the previous Pit Stop.
- In this leg's first Roadblock, one team member had to search among several rowboats named after famous Portuguese individuals until they found one of four named after a Portuguese explorer (Bartolomeu Dias, Fernão de Magalhães, Pedro Álvares Cabral, or Vasco da Gama). They then had to row it across the marina to a fisherman in order to receive their next clue.
- After the first Roadblock, teams had to select a sardine can at the Mercearia Confiança de Troino, travel on foot to Rua Vasco da Gama, and then paint its design on a specified door in order to receive their next clue, which directed them to Santuário de Cabo Espichel.
- In this season's final Roadblock, the team member who did not perform the previous Roadblock had to count the church's columns while standing within a stone boundary and give the correct number to a monk, who then directed them to the Pit Stop: the Farol de Cabo Espichel.

=== Leg 11 (Portugal → United States) ===
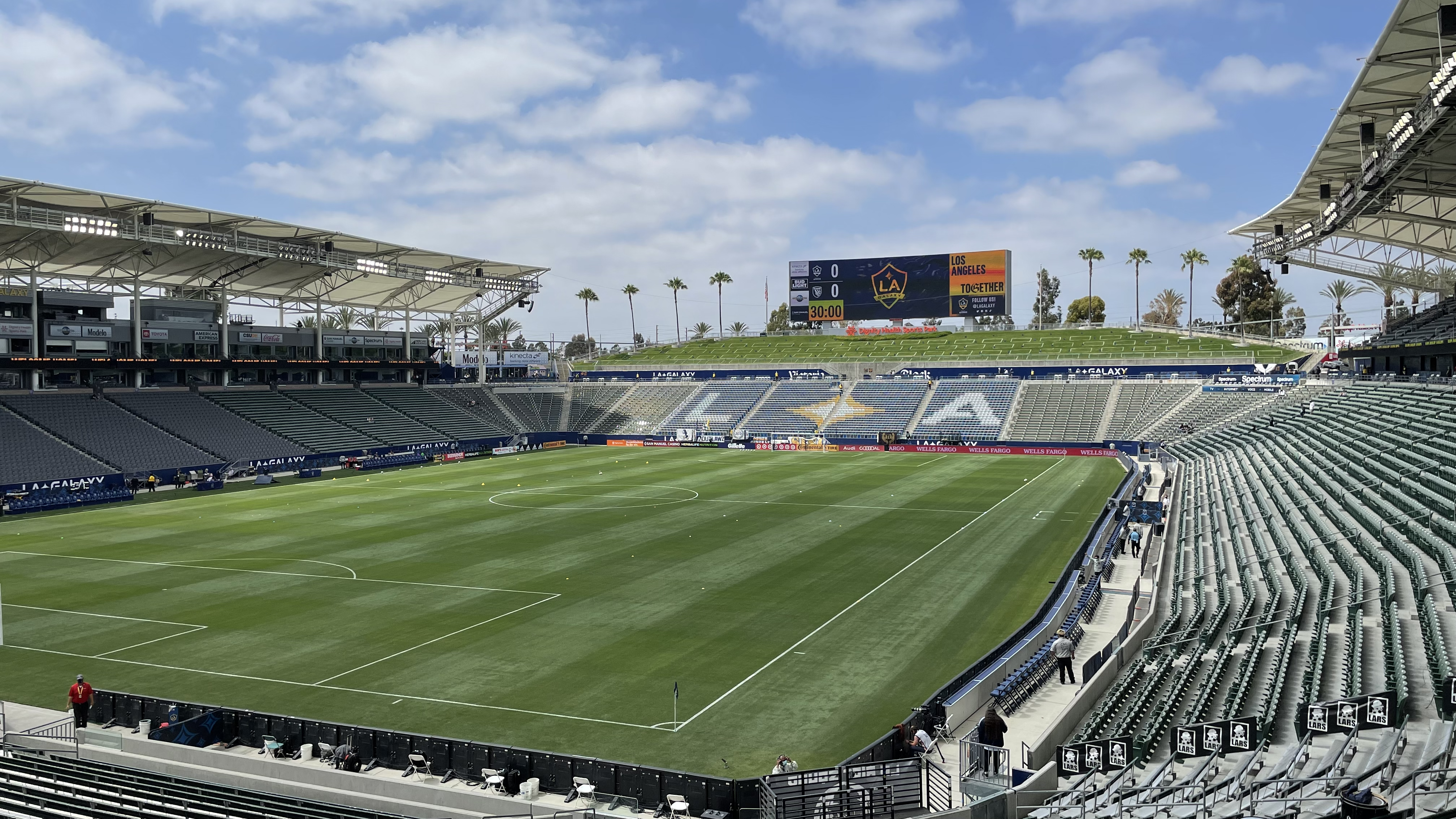
The soccer stadium inside Dignity Health Sports Park in Carson, California was the finish line of The Amazing Race 33.

- Episode 11: "In the Hands of the Amazing Race Gods" (March 2, 2022)
- Prize: US$1,000,000
- Winners: Kim & Penn
- Runners-up: Raquel & Cayla
- Third place: Ryan & Dusty

Locations

- Lisbon → Los Angeles, California
- Los Angeles (Westin Bonaventure Hotel)
- Los Angeles (El Pueblo de Los Ángeles Historical Monument)
- Los Angeles (6465 Sunset Boulevard – S.I.R. Hollywood)
- Carson (Dignity Health Sports Park – Tennis Stadium)
- Carson (Dignity Health Sports Park – Soccer Stadium)

Episode summary

- During the Pit Stop, teams were flown to Los Angeles, California, and began the final leg simultaneously on the roof of the Westin Bonaventure Hotel. There, teams had to find a clue box atop three of the hotel's four towers and spot the combination "going up and down" on an elevator that they needed to unlock their next clue.
- At the El Pueblo de Los Ángeles Historical Monument, one team member had to direct their partner, who was blindfolded with a luchador mask, to hit three specific piñatas that held the three parts of their next clue. When assembled, their clue directed them to S.I.R. Hollywood, where teams had to use props to add sound effects in sync to five silent video clips from previous seasons in order to receive their next clue.
- Teams were next instructed to find the home of the LA Galaxy: Dignity Health Sports Park. There, teams had to answer thirteen riddles by placing the correct tennis rackets with images of people, places, and items that they'd encountered since Leg 4 onto the riddles before a chair umpire directed them to the finish line at the nearby soccer stadium.

Question	Answer
You were greeted at the pit stop with these words	We have two ears and one tongue so that we would listen more and talk less.
This mode of transportation took you the rest of the way	Corte cars
You found this under a rock	Gold coin
It went this far up	8000 ft elevation
It fell out as well	Red & yellow piñata candies
He greeted you with a smile and a drink	Bonifacio Pit Stop greeter Stefan
Under this, he pointed the way	Napoleon Bonaparte with a bicorne
He joined you throughout the leg	Travelocity Roaming Gnome
You checked in here	Parco Ciani
You painted this	Setúbal door
Something you had to eat	Souvlaki
You took this to Number 10	Setúbal rowboat
It's plated correctly	Dolmades

Additional note

- Legs 10 and 11 aired back-to-back as a special two-hour episode.

== Production ==
=== Development and filming ===
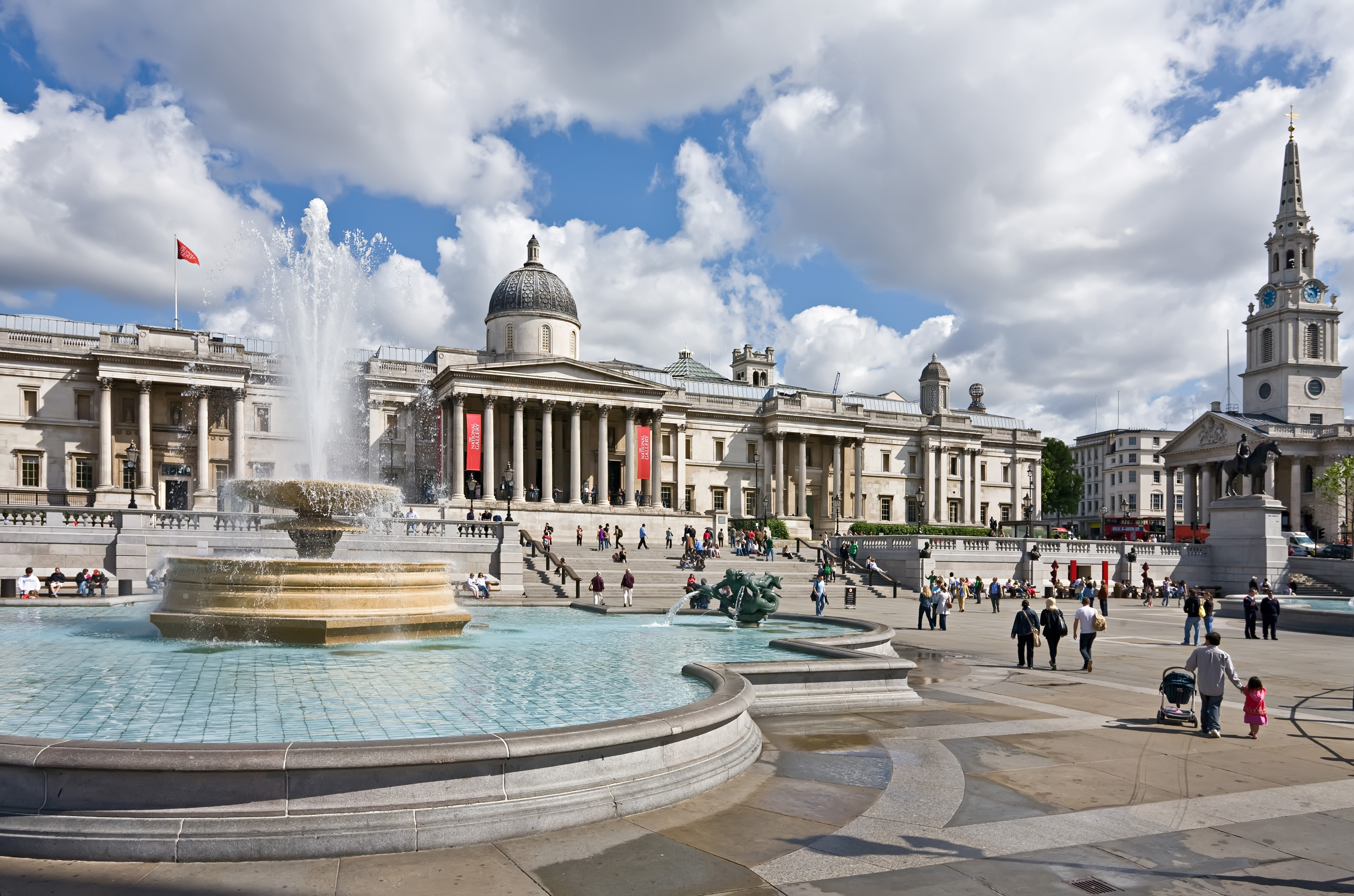
The 33rd season of The Amazing Race started filming on February 22, 2020, with teams being informed to travel to Trafalgar Square in London.

In January 2020, during the winter press tour for the Television Critics Association in Pasadena, California, Amazing Race co-creators and executive producers Bertram van Munster and Elise Doganieri, who were promoting their new National Geographic show Race to the Center of the Earth, confirmed to Andy Dehnart of Reality Blurred that they would be filming a thirty-third season of The Amazing Race later in the year.

Filming began on February 22, 2020, as usual, after host Phil Keoghan finished filming the first season of Tough as Nails. This season of The Amazing Race started with Keoghan contacting teams at their homes, instructing them to travel to London, and it was expected to conclude in mid-March. However, filming was suspended on February 28 after three legs had been completed in England and Scotland with the contestants and production crew sent home as a precaution due to the worsening COVID-19 pandemic. According to van Munster, he contacted CBS after he and his crew arrived in Sweden to film in Lapland, where the fourth leg was to take place, to halt the season due to the dangers of the emerging pandemic. In addition to Sweden, the remainder of the original racecourse prior to production shutdown would have visited Austria, Italy, Vietnam, Thailand, South America, and a first-time visit to Nepal.

==== COVID-19 shutdown ====
After the season was suspended, Phil Keoghan stated that the show intended to resume filming where it had left off, but he also acknowledged that filming could not resume until viral transmissions declined. Kelly Kahl, the President of CBS Entertainment, stated that the show would film "as soon as we can safely get back into production" with the producers working to "plot out a race that sticks to countries that are safe" but acknowledged the difficulties of "literally [having] to navigate some international waters." Kahl also stated that he wasn't aware of any contestants that had dropped out of the season. Keoghan stated a year later that he could not guarantee that every team would be able to return once filming restarted. In April 2021, Mitch Graham, SVP of Alternative Programming, stated that production looked at the option of going to COVID-light countries but that it was unlikely as it would not lead to the same experience of traveling the globe. The following month, the creators of the show stated that they have plans to resume filming the season once they can assure team safety with mass vaccinations in target travel locations. Kahl stated that he hoped to have the season air in the midseason of the 2021–22 television season provided that enough countries open up in the coming months to film the remaining legs. In an interview with Gold Derby in June 2021, Keoghan stated that a plan to film safely had been established.

==== Resumption of filming ====
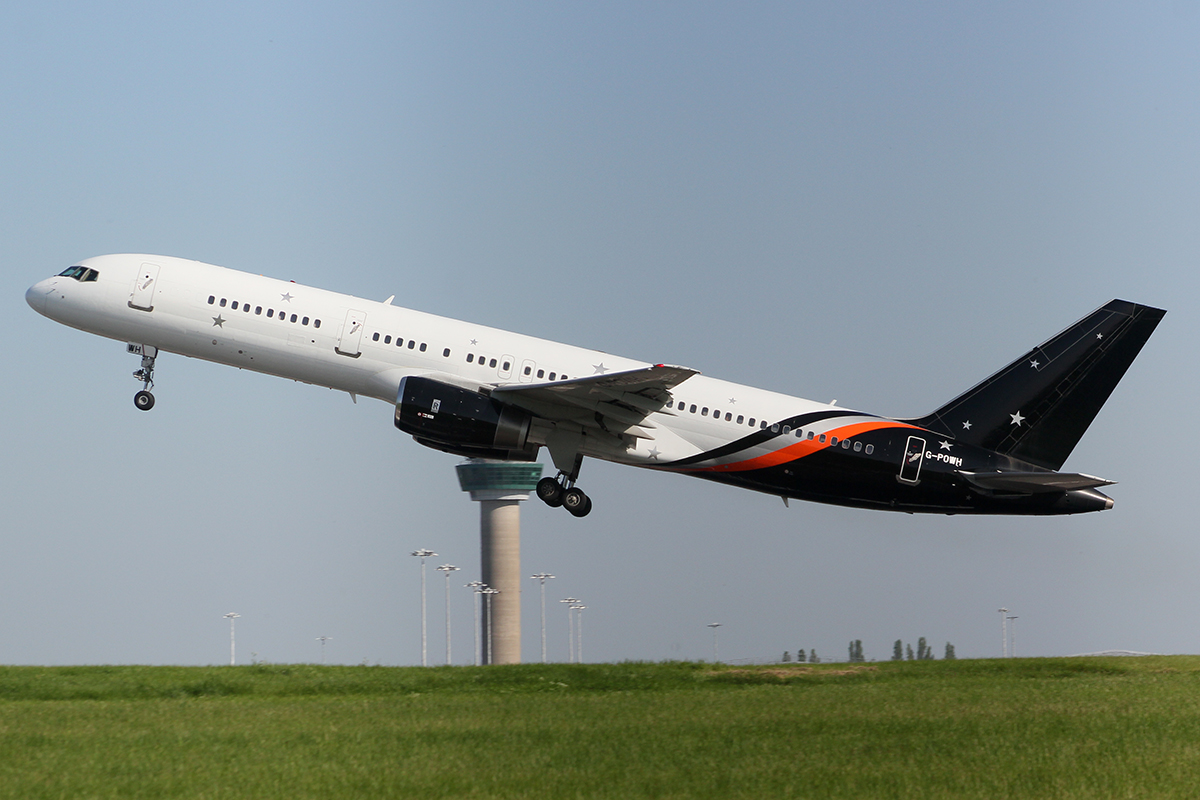
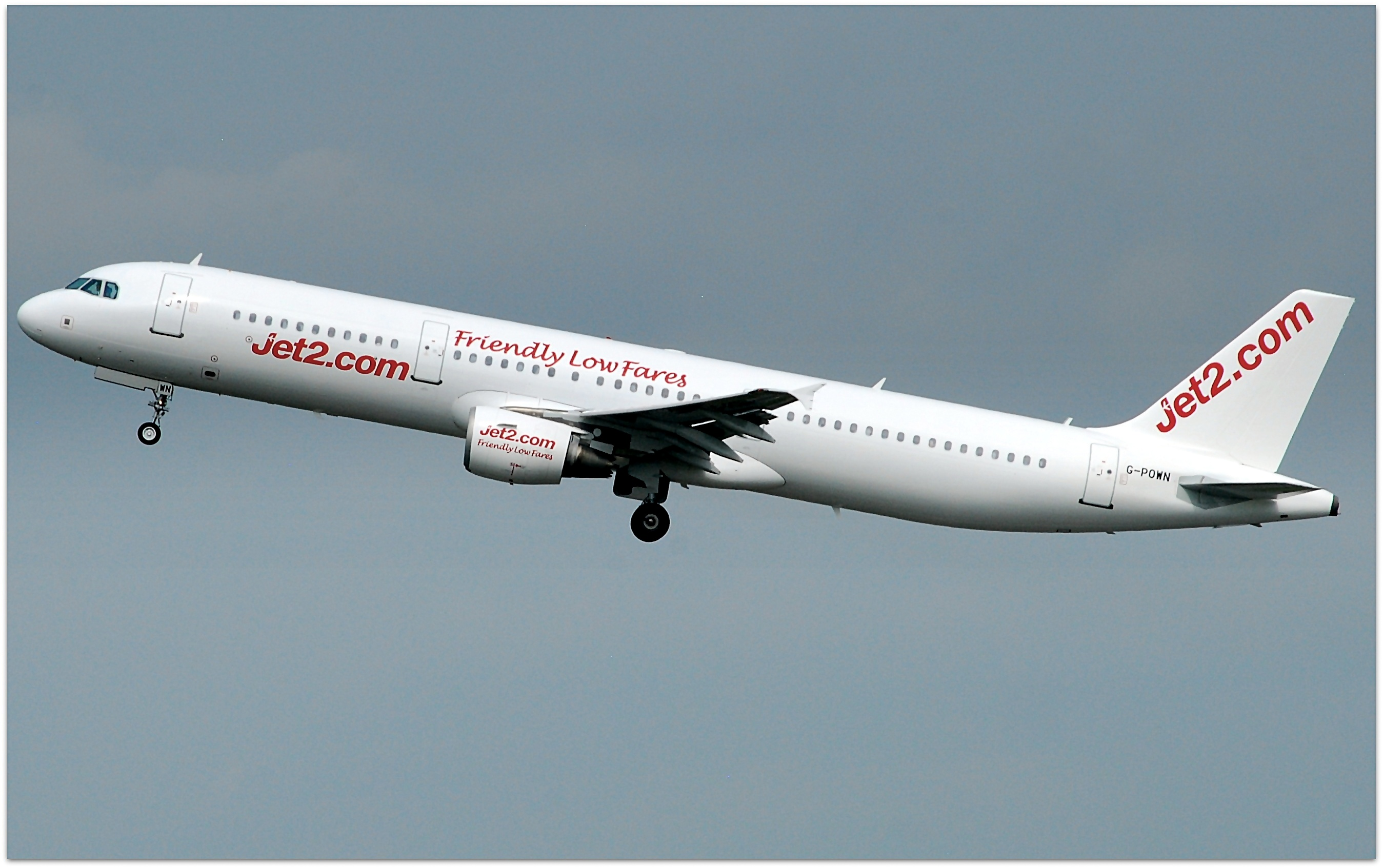
When production resumed in September 2021, teams flew on charter planes to travel between countries for the remaining legs.

In September 2021, Thom Sherman, the Senior Executive Vice President, Programming, CBS Entertainment, announced at the Television Critics Association that the show was in pre-production and would return for the 2021–22 television season. In order to restart the season, production chartered an Amazing Race-branded Titan Airways Boeing 757 for subsequent travel by teams and crew, which included four COVID testing teams, to reduce infection risk. To account for common travel on the chartered jet, teams were released from the charter plane in a number of groups, with those who had checked in at the previous Pit Stop earlier able to start the next leg earlier. Keoghan said that the use of a chartered jet was something they had considered previously as it would have eliminated problems with airports, and in this season, they at times did not inform the racers where their next destination was until they landed. New tasks were developed with social distancing in mind, with preference for outdoor activities rather than crowded indoor ones. Teams were still made to rely on either their own driving or using public transportation where production affirmed that drivers took COVID precautions.

Racers traveled to Switzerland and resumed racing on September 19, 2021, after 1 year, 6 months, and 22 days (nearly nineteen months). The remaining legs after Scotland were altered to have travel proceed through locations with the lowest COVID-19 rates: Zürich, Lugano, Corsica, Halkidiki, Thessaloniki, and Lisbon before returning to Los Angeles. However, four teams were unable to return after production resumed due to extenuating circumstances: Anthony was unable to return due to a recent promotion at his place of work; Caro & Ray had broken up during the hiatus and Caro's work visa had expired, meaning she was unable to return to the United States due to Travel during the COVID-19 pandemic#Americas 3#travel restrictions against non-U.S. citizens; Connie and Sam were expecting a child when the restart was planned; and Taylor was on bereavement following the death of his brother from COVID-19 which had occurred shortly before the planned restart. Two teams that had been originally eliminated before the production shutdown, Michael & Moe and Arun & Natalia, were brought back to the competition. Filming of the season wrapped in October.

=== Casting ===
This season saw Jesse Tannenbaum, who was recently promoted to casting director of Survivor starting with Island of the Idols, become the show's new casting director, a role he previously held during season 29 and season 30, after Lynne Spillman's contract with CBS expired in 2018.

== Reception ==
=== Critical response ===
The Amazing Race 33 received mixed-to-positive reviews. Andy Dehnart of reality blurred wrote that "The Amazing Race 33 was a great season overall. Even with some very thin legs, it felt to me like a throwback to earlier seasons, especially with the post-restart season not having any U-Turns or Yields." Sage Negron of Comic Book Resources wrote that "Season 33 ended up being one of the show's stronger outings." Sandy Casanova of Hidden Remote called it "another amazing season". Dustin Rowles of Pajiba called it "a strange and almost surreal season of The Amazing Race." Denton Davidson of Gold Derby wrote that he "loved most of the cast, but the pandemic and changes it caused this race really hurt the season overall." Daniel Fienberg of The Hollywood Reporter wrote that the season was "generally muted and limited challenge-wise" due to the pandemic. In 2024, Rhenn Taguiam of Game Rant placed this season within the bottom 13 out of 36.

=== Ratings ===
U.S. Nielsen ratings

Viewership and ratings per episode of The Amazing Race 33
No.	Title	Air date	Rating (18–49)	Viewers (millions)	DVR (18–49)	DVR viewers (millions)	Total (18–49)	Total viewers (millions)	Ref.
1–2	"We're Back!" / "It Can't Be That Easy"	January 5, 2022	0.7	4.40	0.4	1.58	1.1	5.97	
3	"Who Has This One in the Bag?"	January 12, 2022	0.5	3.49	0.5	1.98	1.0	5.48	
4	"Ready to Restart the Race"	January 19, 2022	0.7	3.66	—N/a	—N/a	—N/a	—N/a	
5	"Stairway to Hell"	January 26, 2022	0.6	3.93	0.5	1.89	1.1	5.81	
6	"Say Cheese"	February 2, 2022	0.6	3.76	0.5	1.72	1.1	5.48	
7	"Gently Down the Stream"	February 9, 2022	0.6	2.97	0.4	1.75	1.0	4.72	
8	"Souvlaki"	February 16, 2022	0.5	3.17	0.4	1.74	0.9	4.91	
9	"Rock Bottom"	February 23, 2022	0.5	3.28	0.5	1.76	1.0	5.05	
10–11	"No Room For Error" / "In the Hands of the Amazing Race Gods"	March 2, 2022	0.7	3.97	0.3	1.73	1.0	5.71	

Canadian ratings

Canadian broadcaster CTV also aired The Amazing Race on Wednesdays. Canadian DVR ratings are included in Numeris's count.

No.	Air date	Episode	Viewers (millions)	Rank (Week)	Ref
1–2	January 5, 2022	"We're Back!" / "It Can't Be That Easy"	1.48	7	
3	January 12, 2022	"Who Has This One in the Bag?"	1.28	9	
4	January 19, 2022	"Ready to Restart the Race"	1.49	5	
5	January 26, 2022	"Stairway to Hell"	1.35	8	
6	February 2, 2022	"Say Cheese"	1.20	8	
7	February 9, 2022	"Gently Down the Stream"	1.24	9	
8	February 16, 2022	"Souvlaki"	1.28	5	
9	February 23, 2022	"Rock Bottom"	1.28	11	
10–11	March 2, 2022	"No Room For Error" / "In the Hands of the Amazing Race Gods"	1.34	8	

== Works cited ==
- Castro, Adam-Troy (2006). My Ox Is Broken!. BenBella Books. ISBN 978-1-932100-91-4.
