= Victoria, London =

Section of the City of Westminster, England

Coordinates: 51.496°N 0.143°W

Victoria
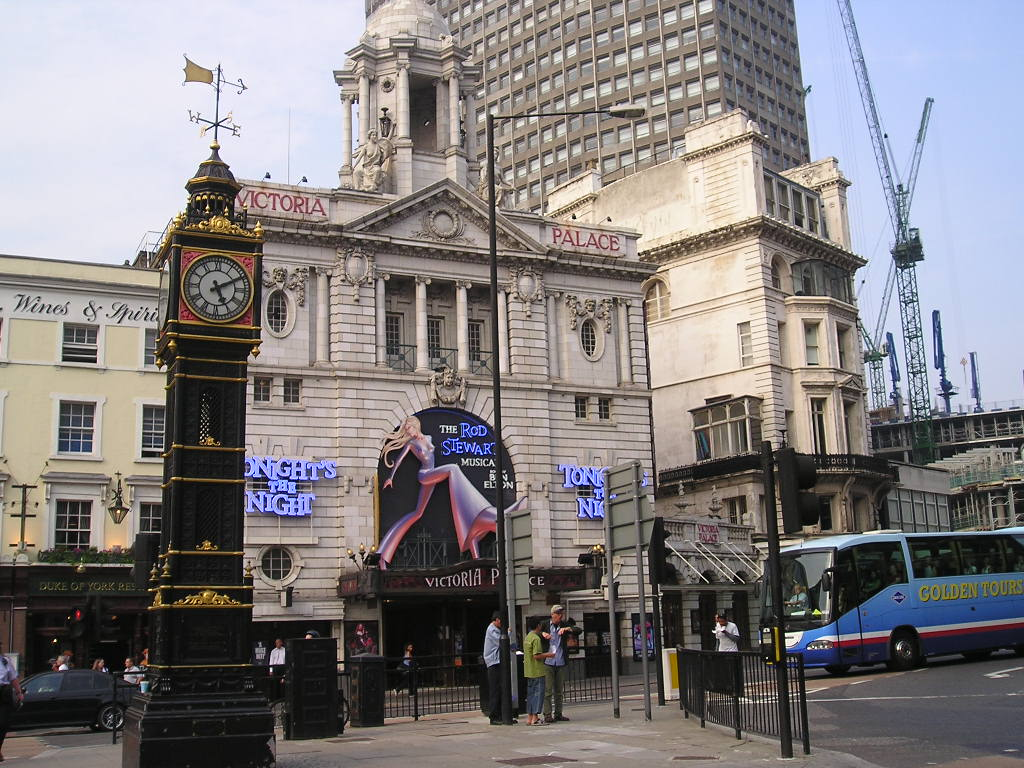
- The "Little Ben" clock tower, and Victoria Palace Theatre

- Location within Greater London
- London borough: Westminster
- Ceremonial county: Greater London
- Region: London
- Country: England
- Sovereign state: United Kingdom
- Post town: LONDON
- Dialling code: 020
- Police: Metropolitan
- Fire: London
- Ambulance: London
- UK Parliament: Cities of London and Westminster
- London Assembly: West Central

Victoria is an area of Westminster, Central London, in the City of Westminster. It is named after Victoria Station, which is a major transport hub. The station was named after the nearby Victoria Street, opened 1851.

The name is used to describe streets adjoining or nearly adjoining the station in the West End of London, including Victoria Street, Buckingham Palace Road, Wilton Road, Grosvenor Gardens, and Vauxhall Bridge Road. Victoria consists predominantly of commercial property and private and social housing, with retail uses along the main streets.

The area contains one of the busiest transport interchanges in London and the United Kingdom, including the listed railway station and the underground station, as well as Terminus Place, which is a major hub for bus and taxi services. Victoria Coach Station, 900 yards (800 metres) southwest of the railway station, provides road-coach services to long-distance UK and continental destinations.

Victoria Street runs on an east–west axis from Victoria station to Broad Sanctuary at Westminster Abbey. Cardinal Place, across the street from Westminster Cathedral, opened in 2006 and contains a selection of restaurants, banks and shops, including a Marks and Spencer store. Further along the street, there was a large House of Fraser department store (formerly the Army & Navy) opposite Westminster City Hall. At the Broad Sanctuary end is the Department for Business, Energy and Industrial Strategy building, the headquarters of Transport for London at Windsor House, and the former New Scotland Yard building (headquarters of the Metropolitan Police Service from 1967 to 2016).

== History ==
A map showing the Victoria ward of Westminster Metropolitan Borough as it appeared in 1916.

The area formed part of the parish of St George Hanover Square.

Long before Cardinal Place opposite the cathedral came into being there was a huge brewery (Stag Brewery) based at the western end of Victoria Street. From the early 17th century it started off as a small brewhouse with properties that once were part of St James's Palace. This then substantially grew and then was bought and owned by Watney & Co. They built lodgings around the brewery as well as amenities for their staff to use. By the end of the 19th century they were employing a sizeable number of staff. (It closed down in 1959 and was demolished. All that now remains of it is a street named Stag Place and a pub called the Stag.)

Part of a slum, dubbed "Devil's Acre" by Charles Dickens, was demolished to construct Victoria Street, which opened for use in 1851.

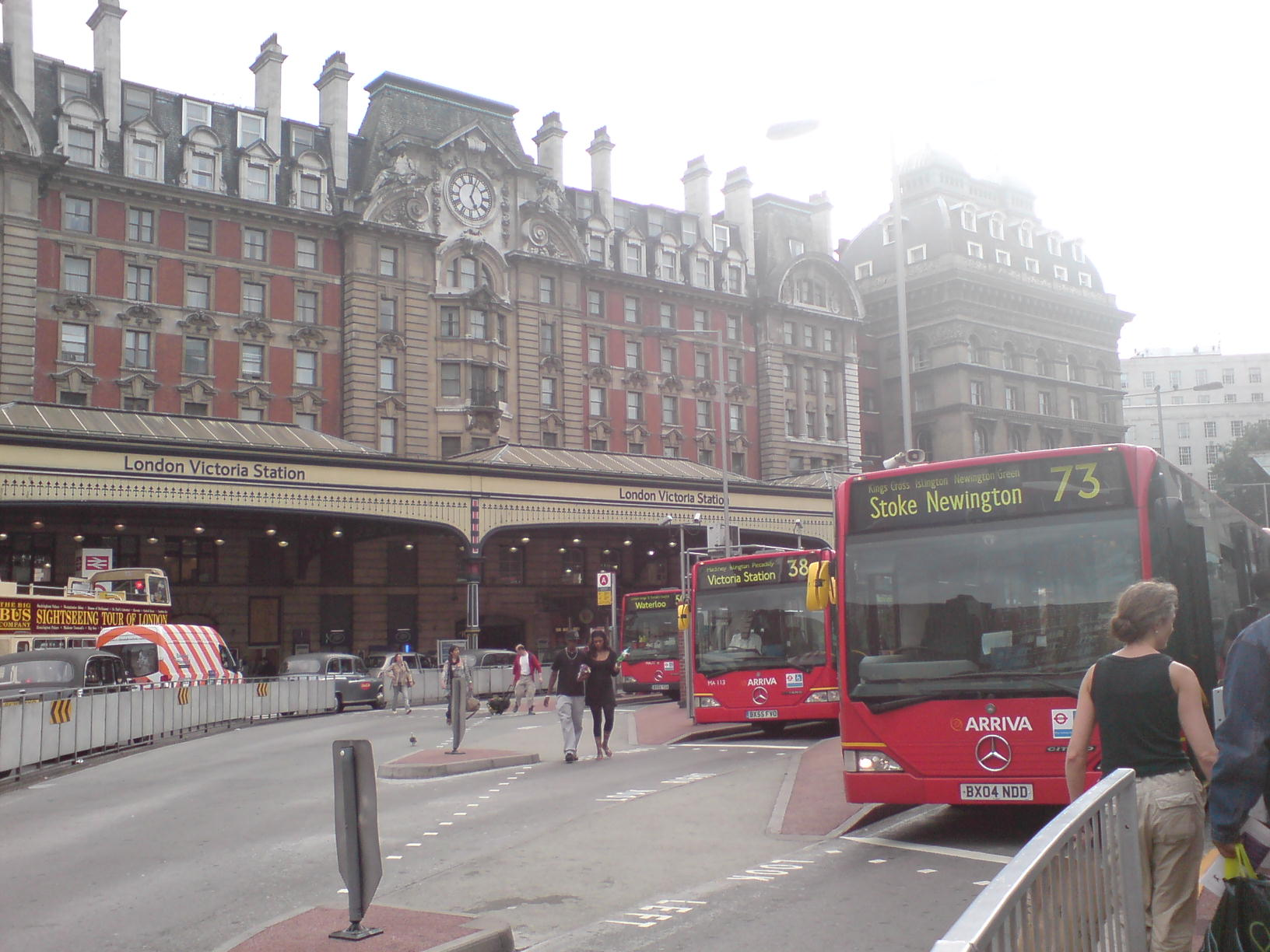
Victoria bus station, outside Victoria railway station in 2007, with three bendy buses loading up. (This is not to be confused with Victoria Coach Station).

Pleasance Pendred and three other suffragettes smashed the windows of various shops including the antiquities shop at 167 Victoria Street in 1913.

Victoria Station was built in 1860.

The architect Archibald Leitch who was renowned for his work designing football stadiums including Goodison Park, Craven Cottage, Anfield, Stamford Bridge, Old Trafford, Ibrox and White Hart Lane among many others, had offices which were based at 53 Victoria Street and the street as a whole housed many consulting engineering firms until the 1970s.

According to Norman Wisdom's biography, he slept near the statue of Marshal Foch by the bus station at the westerly end of the street when his parents split up at the age of 9. Before going into comedy he worked as an errand boy in the then grand Artillery Mansions on Victoria Street which was then a grand hotel. In the 1980s it went into decay and became a squat – and in the 1990s was gutted, refurbished and now it is an elegant apartment block.

== Landmarks ==
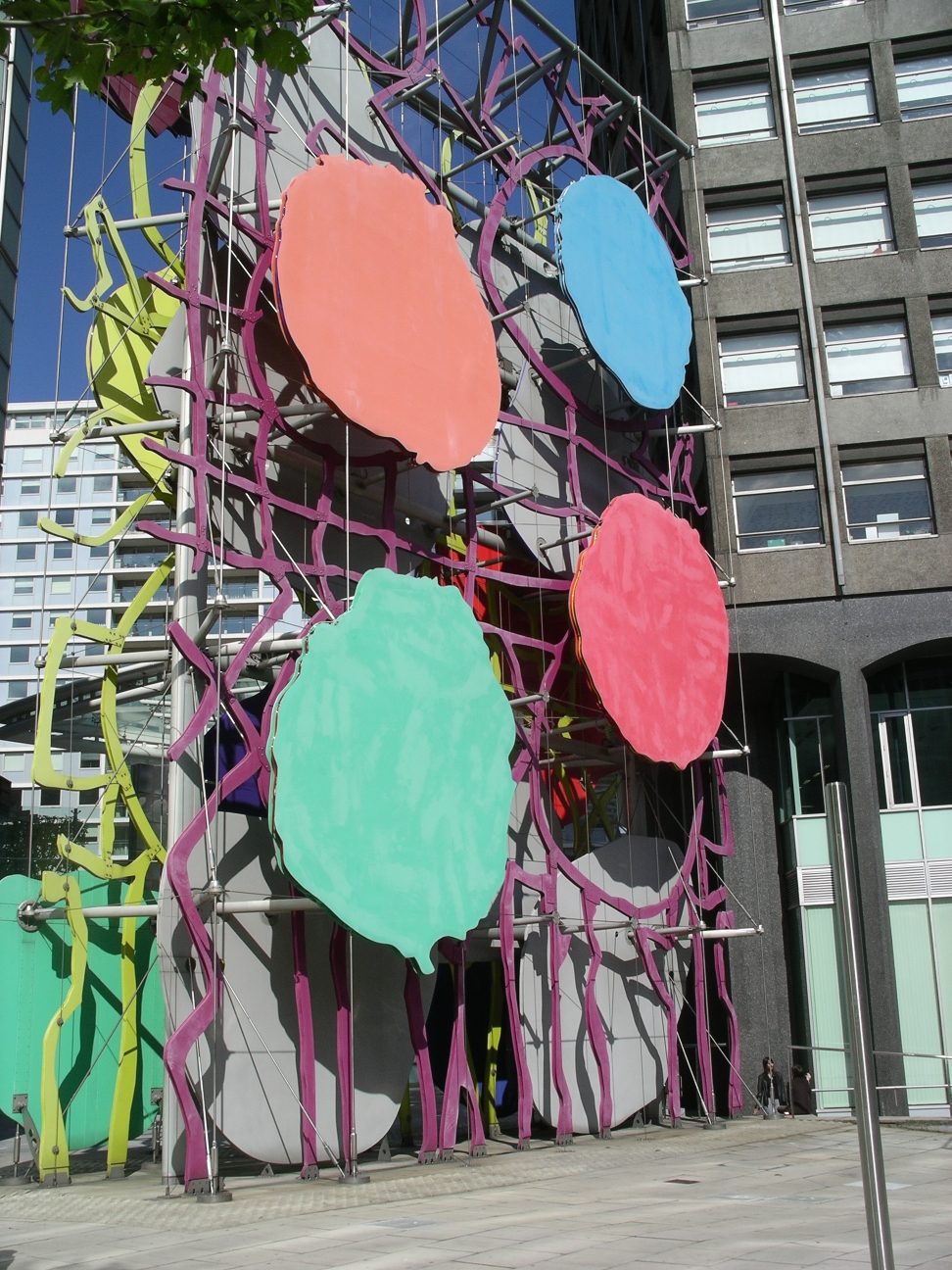
Public art by Patrick Heron in the Victoria area

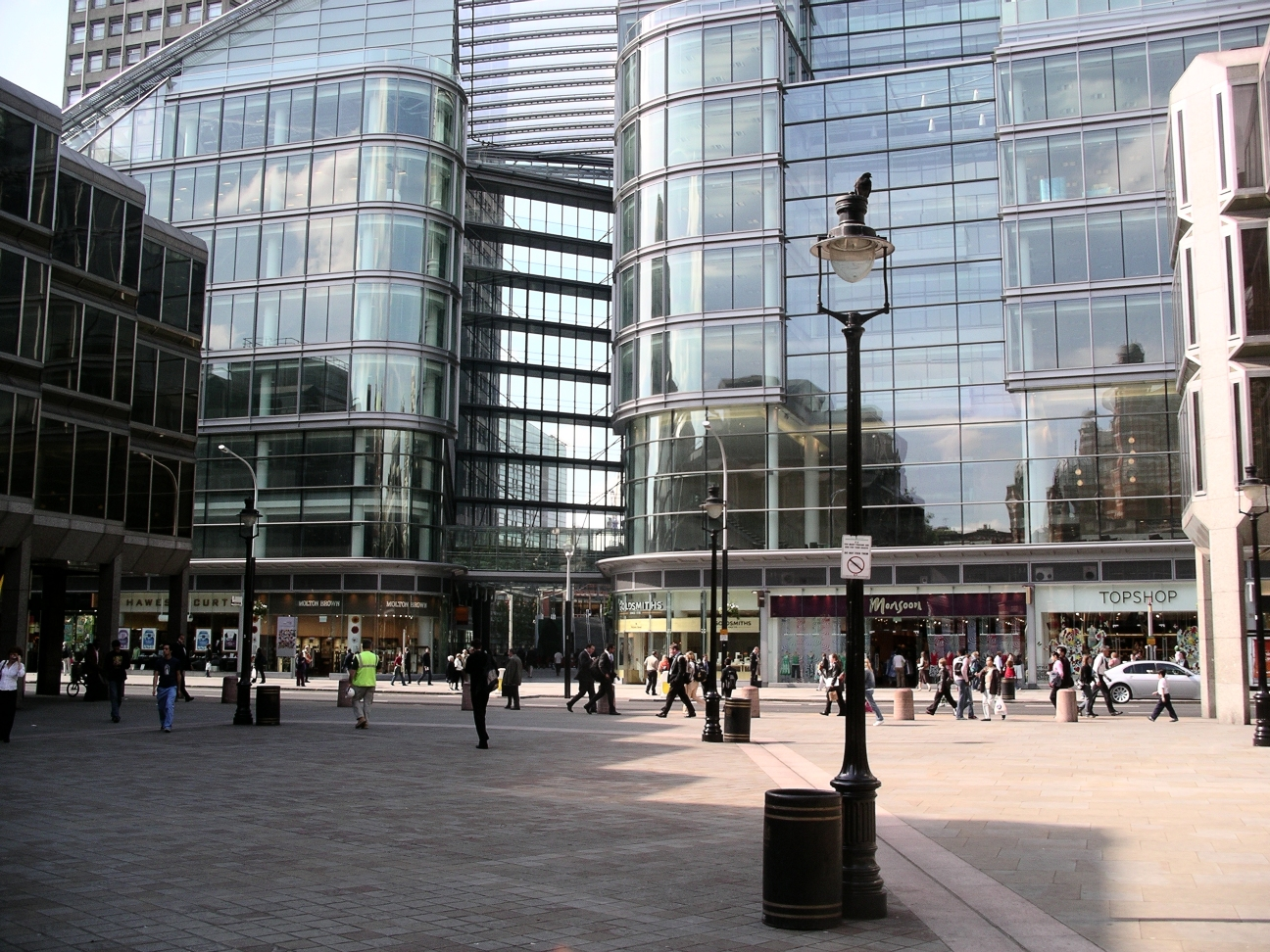
Cardinal Place development

Westminster Cathedral is the largest Catholic church in the UK and the seat of the Archbishop of Westminster. It was built between 1895 and 1903 in the Neo-Byzantine style on a site previously occupied by the Tothill Fields Bridewell prison from 1618 to 1884.

Victoria Palace Theatre dates from 1911 and replaced the Royal Standard Music Hall, built in 1886. That itself had been a replacement for an earlier Royal Standard Music Hall, which originally opened in 1850 as Moy's Music Hall.

Little Ben, a 20 feet (6.1 m)-tall clock tower in the style of Big Ben, stands at the intersection of Vauxhall Bridge Road and Victoria Street. It was erected in 1892 but removed in 1964 during road widening works, and was kept in storage until eventually being restored in 1981.

The Apollo Victoria Theatre was built in 1929 in Art Deco style, opening in 1930 the New Victoria Cinema. It closed in 1975 before being reopened as a theatre in 1981. In 1984 it became host to the musical Starlight Express, which remained its main production until 2002.

Opposite the Victoria Street entrance to Victoria Station is the site of the former Metropole Kinema, built in 1929 and in operation until 1977. It reopened in 1978 as The Venue, a live music club owned by Virgin Records, which ran until 1984. The building was demolished in 2013.

The House of Fraser department store on Victoria Street, opened in 2005, is built on the site of the former flagship branch of the Army & Navy Stores, opened in 1872. Army & Navy Stores had been acquired by House of Fraser in 1973.

== Local schools ==
Three notable schools are closest to the Victoria neighbourhood, Westminster City School for Boys and Grey Coat Hospital for Girls, as well as the independent Westminster School at Deans Yard near Westminster Abbey.

== Future ==
Victoria is a designated 'Opportunity Area' in the Mayor's London Plan and Westminster City Council's Adopted Core Strategy January 2011 policy planning document, recognising the potential of the area, with its excellent transport links to accommodate commercial and residential growth. There are a number of emerging proposals for major redevelopment in the area, including improvements to the Victoria Underground Station, and regeneration of surrounding sites.

== See also ==
- Pimlico
