= The Holderness Family =

American internet personalities

The Holderness Family are American internet personalities best known for their Facebook, TikTok, and YouTube channels, which have over 5 million combined subscribers and over 1 billion total views. They create family-centered parodies, skits, and vlogs. They are a family of four based in Raleigh, North Carolina, consisting of husband and wife Penn (born 1974) and Kim Holderness (born 1976), their daughter, Lola, and son, Penn Charles.

== Career ==
In 2013, the Holderness Family released "XMAS Jammies," a parody of Will Smith's "Miami" meant to be their family's digital Christmas card. Their video went viral on YouTube and had 18 million views in its first 10 years.

Subsequent releases included a Halloween-themed Snoop Dogg parody called "Kin and Moose", a Meghan Trainor parody about Thanksgiving titled "All About That Baste", a parody of Eminem's "Lose Yourself", and a parody of Dean Martin's "Baby, It's Cold Outside" which garnered over 75 million views on Facebook.

In 2020, when COVID-19 hit, they made several viral parodies and skits, including a Hamilton medley about wearing a mask and a Frozen parody called "It's Vaccination Day" to showcase their reactions to securing a COVID-19 vaccine appointment.

They have released a new "XMAS Jammies" every holiday season, and have added over 300 additional parodies in between. Kim has also starred in several viral skits in their subchannel "Holderness Family Vlogs", including "When Rona Won't Leave", "The New Normal" and "Every Hallmark Movie Ever".

On broadcast television, the Holderness Family have appeared on The Today Show, Fox & Friends, Good Morning America, CNN, HLN, CBS This Morning, and multiple times on Right This Minute. Their full-length specials include The Holderness Family on UPTV, The 12 Foods of Christmas on The Food Network, and The Greatest Holiday Video Countdown on The CW. Kim and Penn won Season 33 of the Amazing Race.

== Books and podcast ==
On March 30, 2021, their book about improving communication in a marriage, Everybody Fights: So Why Not Get Better At It, was published by the HarperCollins subsidiary Thomas Nelson.

In 2024, they published ADHD is Awesome: A Guide to (Mostly) Thriving With ADHD, followed in 2025 by the children's book All You Can Be with ADHD, which was described as "a rhyming celebration of how special it can be to have a brain that works differently."

In 2018, they launched the Holderness Family Podcast, which has since been renamed Laugh Lines with Kim & Penn Holderness. The two discuss personal issues, growing older and lighter topics. The program is also available on YouTube.

== Personal life ==
Kim Dean Holderness was born and raised in Sarasota, Florida, and was a competitive dancer. She went to the University of Florida, where she was a member of the Dazzlers dance team that performs at athletic events. She graduated in 1998 with a degree in telecommunications. She worked as a television reporter in Florida before joining Inside Edition from 2004 to 2008 in New York City.

Penn Holderness was born and raised in Durham, North Carolina, to a Presbyterian minister and a public school teacher. He graduated from Durham's Charles E. Jordan High School, where he played basketball and was a choral music student at the residential Governor's School of North Carolina (East). He is on the board of directors of the Governor's School Foundation. In 1996 he graduated from the University of Virginia with a degree in philosophy. His first on-air journalism job was in Grand Junction, Colorado, followed by five years in Orlando. From 2003 to 2005, he hosted three seasons of Designer Finals on HGTV. He hosted a college basketball show on CSTV with former University of North Carolina basketball coach Matt Doherty. Penn also worked as a video essayist for ABC and ESPN while living in New York before returning to North Carolina, where he anchored the evening news for WNCN-TV. He has a brother, Dail.

Penn and Kim met in Orlando while working in local news and were married in 2005. After careers in journalism, they worked for Greenroom Communications, a video production company. They are creative consultants at Walk West, a Raleigh-based marketing and advertising firm. They formed their own company, Holderness Family Productions, in 2013. Kim is the chief executive officer and Penn is the chief creative officer. They both appeared in small roles in the 2013 film Iron Man 3, as news reporters.

Penn and Kim competed on and were the winners of the 33rd season of The Amazing Race. During the Race, Penn discussed having ADHD and Kim discussed having anxiety.

== In popular culture ==
In December 2014, Saturday Night Live aired a skit spoofing the Holderness Family called “Christmas Sweatpants.” Taran Killam, Amy Adams, Kyle Mooney, Kenan Thompson, and Kate McKinnon played the Tenderfield Family, wearing pajamas like those worn by the Holderness Family in their first viral video.
