= Little Ben =

Clock tower in the City of Westminster

Coordinates: 51.49646°N 0.14265°W

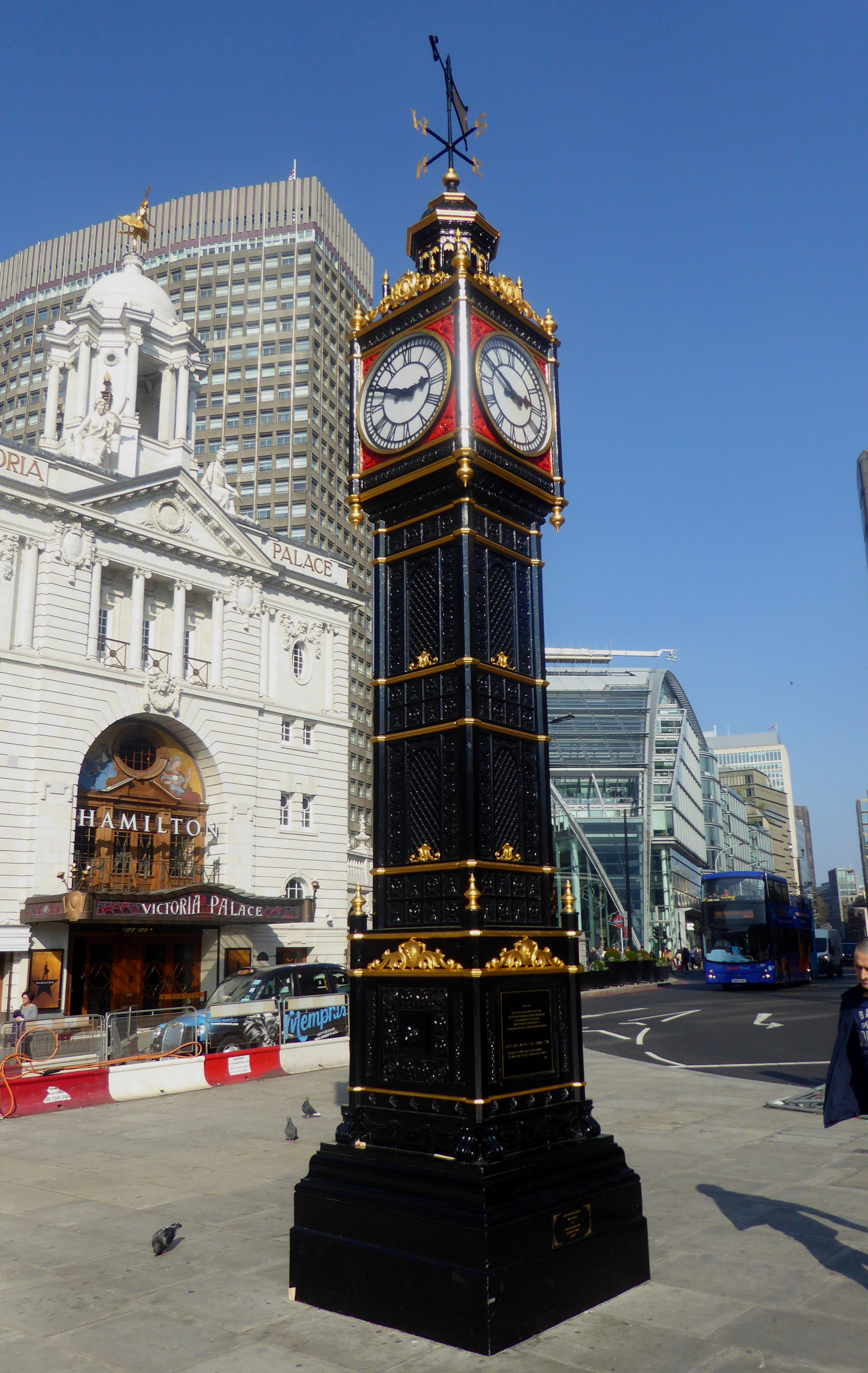
Little Ben in Victoria Street, as seen from the west

Little Ben is a cast iron miniature clock tower, situated at the intersection of Vauxhall Bridge Road and Victoria Street, in the City of Westminster, close to the approach to Victoria station. In design it mimics the famous clock tower colloquially known as Big Ben at the Palace of Westminster, found at the other end of Victoria Street.

Little Ben was manufactured, according to Pevsner, by Gillett & Johnston of Croydon, and was erected in 1892; removed from the site in 1964, and restored and re-erected in 1981 by Westminster City Council with sponsorship from Elf Aquitaine Ltd "offered as a gesture of Franco-British friendship".

There is a rhyming couplet Apology for Summer Time signed "J.W.R." affixed to the body of the clock:

My hands you may retard or may advance
my heart beats true for England as for France.

The couplet is a reference to the plan that the clock be permanently on Daylight Saving Time leading to the time being correct for France during the winter months and correct for the UK during the summer. However this policy was either changed, or never implemented, since recently it is on GMT in winter and BST in summer like all other clocks in Great Britain.

А replica of Little Ben called Lorloz (painted silver) was erected in 1903 in the centre of Victoria, capital of Seychelles to mark the Diamond Jubilee of Queen Victoria in 1897.

Little Ben was removed in 2012 and put in storage during upgrade works to London Victoria station. The timepiece was refurbished by Smith of Derby Group and the clock tower was reinstalled on 28 February 2016.

Little Ben was listed Grade II on the National Heritage List for England in December 1987.
