= Giuncaggio =

Giuncaggio Ghjuncaghju (Corsican)
- Commune
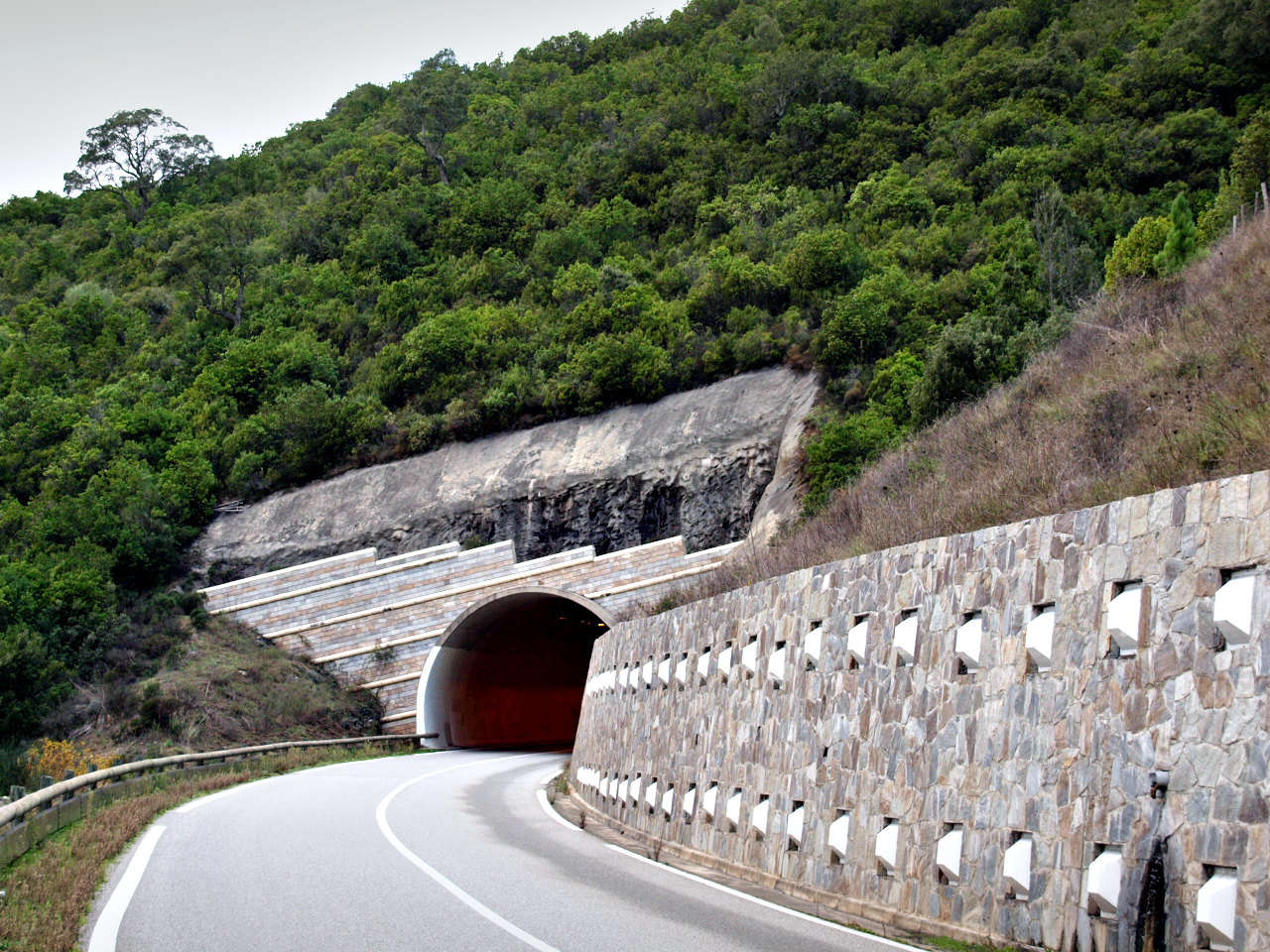
- Isolella tunnel
- Location of Giuncaggio
- Location within France Location within Corsica
- Coordinates: 42°13′03″N 9°22′00″E
- Country: France
- Region: Corsica
- Department: Haute-Corse
- Arrondissement: Corte
- Canton: Ghisonaccia

Government
  - Mayor (2020–2026): Patrick Marchioni
- Area^{1}: 16.15 km^{2} (6.24 sq mi)
- Elevation: 600 m (2,000 ft)
- Highest elevation: 745 m (2,444 ft)
- Lowest elevation: 6 m (20 ft)
- Population (2023): 91
  - Density: 5.6/km^{2} (15/sq mi)
- Time zone: UTC+01:00 (CET)
  - Summer (DST): UTC+02:00 (CEST)
- INSEE/Postal code: 2B126 /20251
- ^{1} French Land Register data, which excludes lakes, ponds, glaciers > 1 km^{2} (0.386 sq mi or 247 acres) and river estuaries.

Giuncaggio (French pronunciation: [dʒunkadʒo]; Corsican: Ghjuncaghju) is a commune in the Haute-Corse department of France on the island of Corsica.

== Population ==
Historical population
Year	Pop.	±% p.a.
1968	148	—
1975	138	−0.99%
1982	131	−0.74%
1990	76	−6.58%
1999	76	+0.00%
2007	66	−1.75%
2012	55	−3.58%
2017	62	+2.42%
2023	91	+6.60%
Source: INSEE

== See also ==
- Communes of the Haute-Corse department
