= Torra di Fautea =

Tower in Corsica

Tower of Fautea
- Torra di Fautea (Corsican)
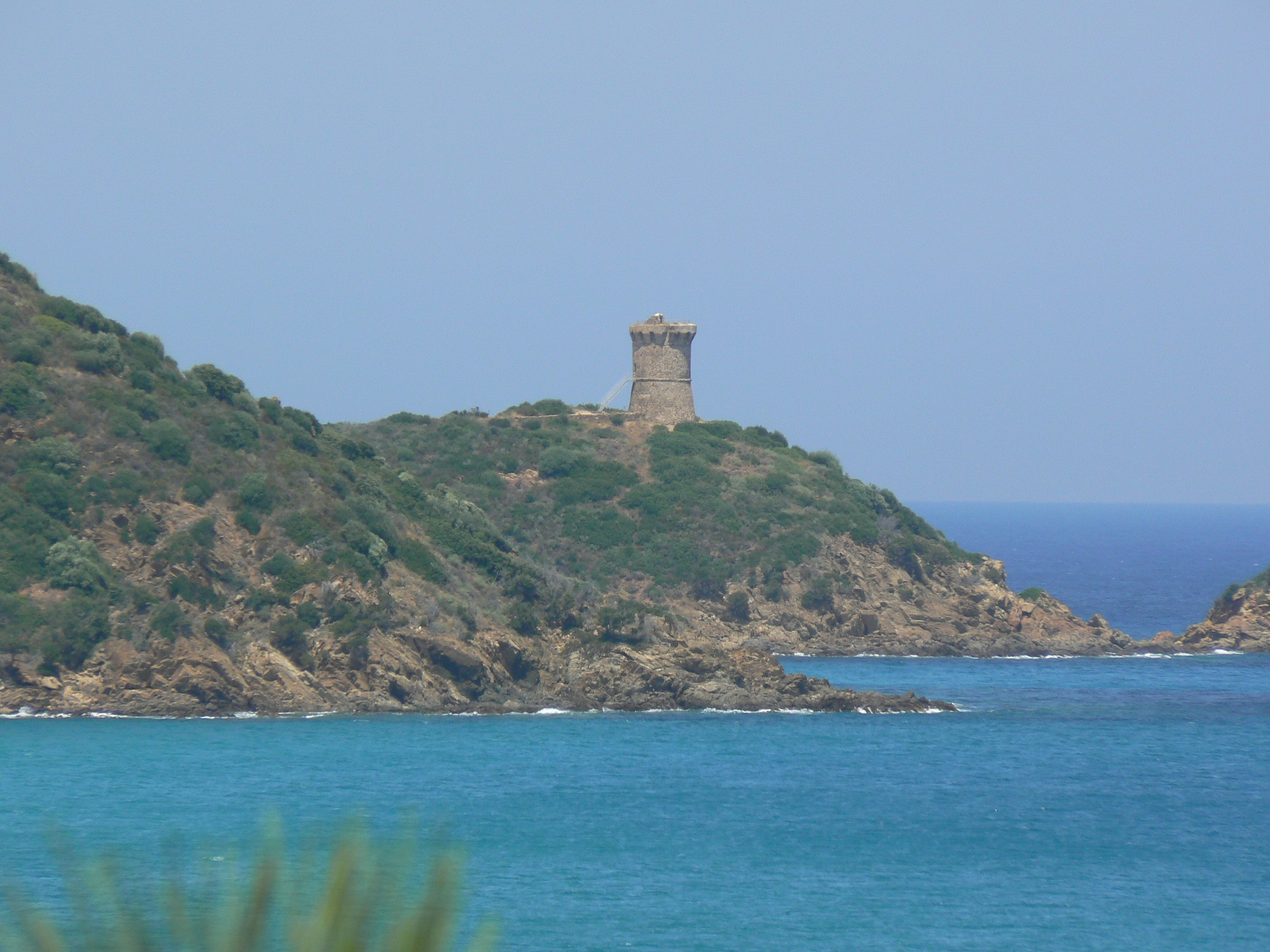

- Location within Corsica
- 41°42′48″N 9°24′21″E

History
- Built: before 1601

Monument historique
- Designated: 27 October 1992
- Reference no.: PA00099146

The Tower of Fautea (Corsican: Torra di Fautea) is a Genoese tower located in the commune of Zonza (Corse-du-Sud) on the east coast of the French island of Corsica. The tower sits at an elevation of 32 metres (105 ft) on the Punta di Fautea.

The tower was one of a series of coastal defences constructed by the Republic of Genoa between 1530 and 1620 to stem the attacks by Barbary pirates. It was built before 1601, the date of a document recording a payment made to one of the soldiers responsible for guarding the tower. It was attacked and burnt in 1650 by the Ottoman Turks. It was restored between 1988 and 1991 and again between 1994 and 1995. In 1992 it was listed as one of the official historical monuments of France.

The tower is owned and maintained by the Collectivité Territoriale de Corse in an agreement with the French government agency, the Conservatoire du littoral. The agency plans to purchase 95 hectares (230 acres) of the headland and as of 2011 had acquired 38 hectares (94 acres).

== See also ==
- List of Genoese towers in Corsica
