= Cape Espichel Lighthouse =

Lighthouse in Portugal

Cape Espichel Lighthouse Farol do Cabo Espichel
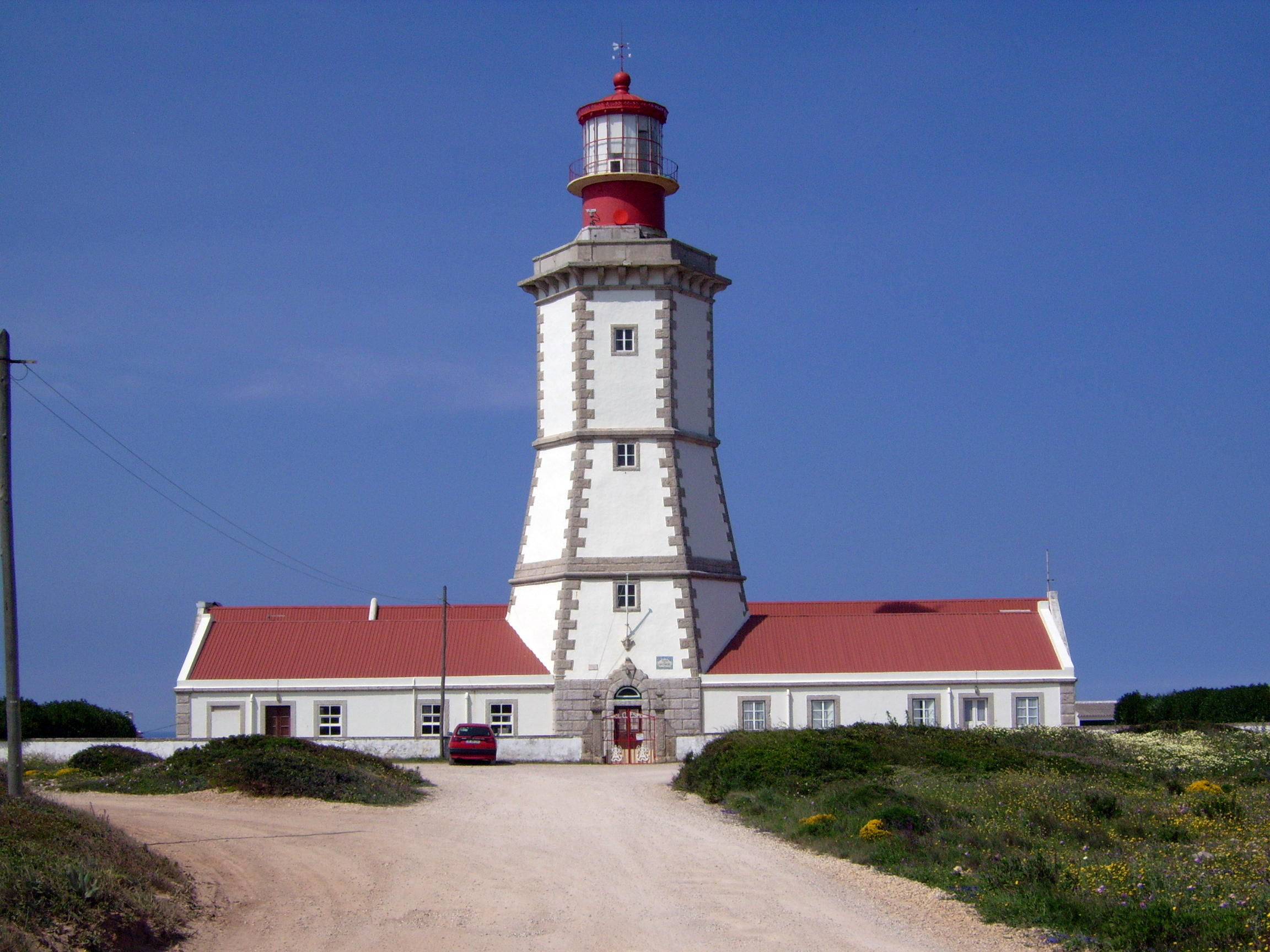
- Cape Espichel Lighthouse
- Location: Sesimbra, Setúbal District, Portugal
- Coordinates: 38°24′56″N 9°12′59″W

Tower
- Constructed: 1790
- Construction: stone
- Automated: 1989
- Height: 32 metres (105 ft)
- Heritage: heritage without legal protection

Light
- Focal height: 168 m (551 ft)
- Lens: Fourth-order Fresnel 300mm
- Range: 26 nautical miles
- Characteristic: Fl W 4s

Cape Espichel Lighthouse (Portuguese: Farol do Cabo Espichel) is situated on the western coast of the civil parish of Castelo, municipality of Sesimbra, in the Setúbal district of Portugal. The lighthouse was built in 1790.

== History ==
Cape Espichel Lighthouse was built on the site of a hermitage that had been founded in the middle of the 14th Century to hold an image of the Virgin, which had been found on a rock. A small community grew up to receive pilgrims and, over the centuries, inns, houses and shops were developed. The Sanctuary of Nossa Senhora do Cabo Espichel continues to attract many visitors.

As early as 1430 the monks of the hermitage had built a beacon on the site. Despite this, and similar informal efforts along the Portuguese coastline, the coast was known by foreign ships, especially the British, as the "black coast", because there was no lighting system to aid navigation. The construction of the present lighthouse owes much to the reforms that followed the 1755 earthquake, which resulted in the Marquis of Pombal creating an organized Lighthouse Service in 1758 and ordering six lighthouses to be built. Cape Espichel light dates from 1790 and is situated about 600 meters from the sanctuary. It consists of a hexagonal tower in three levels, built with thick masonry walls. The lowest two levels have sloped walls while the walls of the top part are vertical. In appearance it is very similar to the Guia lighthouse near Cascais, another of the six lights proposed by the Marquis of Pombal.

There is little documented information about the quality of the light provided in its early years. In 1865 a report noted that the lighthouse produced a fixed, white light using seventeen Argand lamps, covering an arc of 260 degrees and having a range of 13 nautical miles. The unit that housed the lamps was 6.80 metres high with six faces, each 1.30 metres wide. The report also noted that ventilation for the smoke from the lamps was lacking and that the lighthouse did not have lightning rods (conductors). The height of the building was reported as 30.70 metres. The report also noted that reconstruction work had been carried out in 1817, 1846 and 1848 and that there were four houses for lighthousekeepers, as well as 100 containers to store olive oil for the lamps.

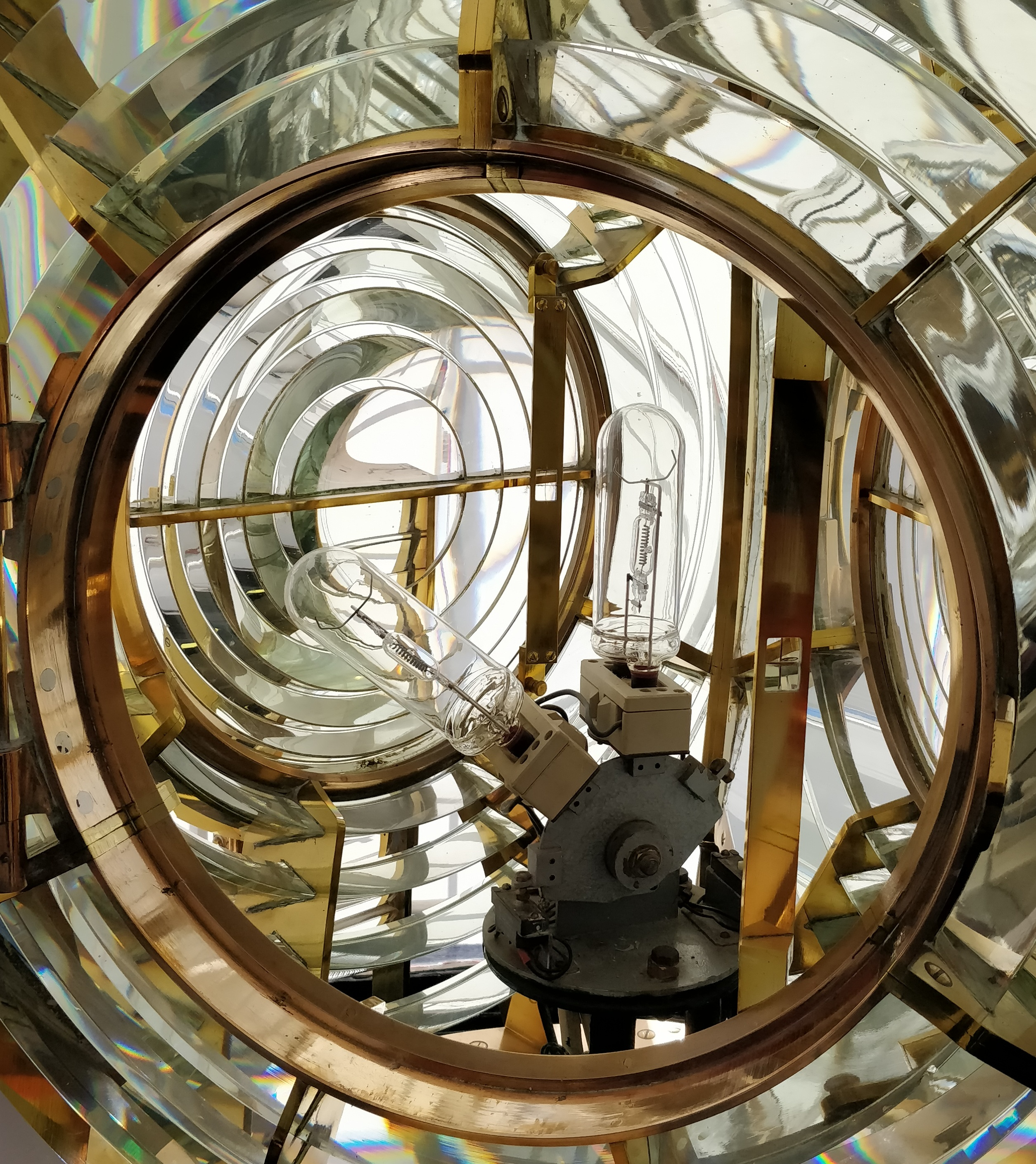
View of lighting system used by Cape Espichel lighthouse.

A new Lighting Plan in 1883 identified improvements to the lighthouse that were required and the General Directorate of Posts, Telegraphs and Lighthouses reported in 1886 that the lighthouse would operate with a new lantern, a first-order Fresnel lens with a 920 mm focal length. It would rotate with four flashes, with rotation to be provided by a clock mechanism. Illumination would be oil powered. The lighthouse was also provided with a mechanically activated bell. This was replaced by a siren of compressed air in 1925. Generators were installed in 1926. In 1947, a new optical apparatus was installed, with a 300 mm focal distance, by the French company Barbier, Benard, et Turenne. A medium frequency (MF) transmitter was installed in 1948. The public electricity network replaced the generators in 1980 and the headlamp was automated in 1989, as was a new sound signal. At an altitude of 168 metres above sea level, the lighthouse now has a range of 26 nautical miles. The bulbs emit a white flash every four seconds. Employing a Catadioptric system the light is aimed both at the horizon and into the sky, the latter as backup navigation for planes, particularly for approaches to Lisbon airport.

Nine-second video of lighting system in operation at Cape Espichel lighthouse

The tower can be accessed by 135 stone and 15 iron steps. The public can visit free of charge on Wednesday afternoons.

== See also ==
- Directorate of Lighthouses, Portugal
- List of lighthouses in Portugal
