= Clarkson's Car Years =

British TV series

- Genre: Documentary/Motoring
- Directed by: Ewan Keil
- Presented by: Jeremy Clarkson
- Country of origin: United Kingdom
- No. of episodes: 6

Production
- Producer: Richard Pearson
- Running time: 30 minutes
- Production company: BBC Birmingham

Original release
- Network: BBC Two
- Release: 1 June – 6 July 2000

Clarkson's Car Years is a British television series presented by Jeremy Clarkson and first shown during June and July 2000 on BBC Two, before being shown to an international audience on BBC World. Since 2008, it has regularly been repeated on various UKTV channels, and was repeated in 2011 for Polish viewers on BBC Knowledge, alongside Motorworld and Extreme Machines.

Over the series, Clarkson discusses six different topics relating to motoring, looking at the defining moments of each. The show was produced by BBC Birmingham and executively produced by Richard Pearson. Car Years was the first of two series involving Clarkson which were filmed during his hiatus from Top Gear (the other being Speed), and his third documentary series for the BBC, following Motorworld and Extreme Machines.

== Episode list ==
#	Episode	Airdate	Production code	Summary
1	"The Rise... and Fall... of the Supercar"	1 June 2000	NBHM014H	Clarkson journeys through the rise of the supercar since its first inception nearly one hundred years ago, and visits a factory in Lincoln, who claim to have produced the first ever supercar. He praises the likes of the Aston Martin DB7, Ferrari F355 and Lamborghini Diablo, as well as early examples including the Ford GT40, before declaring the 1988 Ferrari F40 as the "pinnacle of the supercar" which had still yet to be matched more than a decade on. Series Premiere
2	"How Japan Took Over the World... And Then Lost It"	8 June 2000	NBHM015B	Clarkson takes a journey to Japan in order to show how the country's car economy could have become the most successful in the world. He recalls the huge surge in popularity that Nissan and Toyota enjoyed in the beginning of the 1970s, offering good equipment and reliability at a competitive price, while the British car industry was falling into decline due to industrial disputes and quality control issues. He gives a positive review of the Nissan Skyline GTR, but condemns Toyota for producing a string of bland Corolla models, which became the best selling car in the world during the 1990s, thanks for a reputation for solid build quality and reliability, despite being rated as uninteresting to look at and to drive. He also condemns the Alfa Romeo Arna of the mid-1980s, an Italian built version of the Nissan Cherry, for the shortcomings on its quality and style, before throwing a grenade in one of the last remaining examples of the car in the United Kingdom, and allowing viewers to watch it explode.
3	"Why Do People Like British Sports Cars?"	15 June 2000	NBHM016W	Clarkson invites six British sports car owners for a discussion on what they believe makes a British sports car so great. Morgan's traditional two seater roadsters, the roofless Ariel Atom, 1930s MG T-type, long running AC Cobra, the 1961 Jaguar E-Type and Triumph's TR6 and TR7 sports cars. He recalls how mass production of affordable British sports cars had finished by 1982, but welcomes the revival that the sector had enjoyed by the end of 1990s, with the arrival of the successful MG F and Lotus Elise, and the popular TVR range of sports cars which bridged the gap between the likes of the MG TF and premium brands including Jaguar and Porsche in terms of price.
4	"Who Killed the British Car Industry?"	22 June 2000	NBHM017P	Clarkson looks at the factors that may have accounted for the "killing" of the British car industry in the 1990s, which left virtually all of the car industry defunct or foreign owned by 1994. He recalls the fact that there were dozens of British owned carmakers in Britain in 1950, and that The London Taxi Company (producer of the black taxi) was the largest British owned carmaker less than fifty years later. He begins with a review of the Triumph Stag, a four-seater open top sports car launched in 1970, which won praise for its style and performance, but was condemned for its terrible engine, a 3.0 eight cylinder unit which was created from two Dolomite 1500 engines welded together, despite British Leyland having access to the reliable and powerful Rover 3.5 V8 at the time. Over its seven-year production run, the Stag was blighted by reliability problems. He goes on to berate British Leyland for producing several cars to compete in the same market sectors during the 1970s. The Austin Allegro and Morris Marina come in for the heaviest criticism from Clarkson, who also slams the facelift of 1980 of the Morris Marina, when it was renamed the Ital in honour of Giugiaro's highly regarded ItalDesign studio, as another missed opportunity. Clarkson praises the success of the original Mini, but was keen to point out that even this was a liability for BMC/BL, as its production cost was so high that it was sold at a loss, and that it was in production for forty one years after its launch in 1959, although production was cut back after the launch of the Metro (a more modern and practical small car) in 1980. He criticises Rover's most recent all new car launch (the 1999 Rover 75) for its retro styling. He finished by berating the likes of Tony Benn, Leonard Lord and the once powerful trade unions for the decline of the British car industry.
5	"The New Romantics"	29 June 2000	NBHM018J	Clarkson reviews the history of the hot hatch, starting with the original Volkswagen Golf GTI from the end of the 1970s. He hails the 1980s as a glorious era where "greed was good", and when Britain "waved goodbye to the MG B", a car which he berates as "symbolic of everything that was wrong with Britain in the 1970s", and when hot hatchbacks took their place at a similar price with better practicality, ride and handling. There is also a mention of the Vauxhall Chevette HS and Talbot Lotus Sunbeam of the same era. Clarkson praises the handling and performance of these cars, but criticises their reputation for unreliability - which the Golf GTI proved to be the solution for. He praises the 1980 Ford Escort XR3 as the Golf GTI's first serious rival. Such was the popularity of these cars that by 1983, XR3i sales accounted for more than 10% of all Escort sales, while the GTI achieved more than 25% of Golf sales, and this market sector even saw some of the most unlikely cars being developed into hot hatchbacks, including the Mazda 323, Nissan Cherry and Toyota Corolla. Clarkson then champions the Peugeot 205 GTI of 1984 as the car which proved to be eventual match, if not the superior, to the Golf GTI. Clarkson then reviews the rally versions of these cars, including the mid engine, two seater MG version of the Austin Metro, as well as the four wheel drive Peugeot 205 Rallye. The Ford RS200 of 1984 is also praised; however, this car was axed after just two years, after an RS200 spun out of control at the 1986 Rally de Portugal, killing three spectators, and leading to a ban on all Group B cars. Clarkson then sees the stock market crash of 1987 as the beginning of the end for the hot hatch revolution, although there were still some more impressive creations to come, including the Ford Escort RS Cosworth of the early 1990s. However, Clarkson expressed his dismay that the Escort RS Cosworth was launched just as the culture of the 1980s began to implode, with the recession pushing car sales into decline, and a surge in joyriding saw high performance cars becoming increasingly targeted by thieves, pushing insurance premiums up and contributing to a slump in sales. Clarkson recalls how, at the age of 30 and with over a decade's driving experience behind him, he was quoted at £25,000 for the insurance on an Escort RS Cosworth (£3,000 more than he had paid for it), such was the risk of these cars being targeted by thieves.
6	"Family Car 2000"	6 July 2000	NBHM019D	Clarkson envisions the future for the family car, showcasing the possible vehicles families could be using by 2010. He reviews and praises (or criticises) the revolutionary new Smart car, the stylish first generation Ford Focus, the practical Renault Espace MPV (now in its third generation), and the innovative Vauxhall Zafira compact MPV. He then speaks of his dismay that 4x4 vehicles are now finding popularity as an alternative to traditional family cars, instead of their traditional main use as dealing with off-road terrains and dismal road conditions. He then crowns the Fiat Multipla as the family car of the moment, praising the practicality of its six-seat layout (with three seats on two benches), urging potential buyers not to be put off by its highly unconventional styling. Series Finale
