= Jeremy Clarkson's Extreme Machines =

- Created by: Jeremy Clarkson
- Directed by: Richard Pearson
- Presented by: Jeremy Clarkson
- Theme music composer: David Lowe
- Country of origin: United Kingdom
- Original language: English
- No. of series: 1
- No. of episodes: 6

Production
- Executive producer: Jon Bentley
- Producers: Richard Pearson, Andy Wilman
- Running time: 30 minutes
- Production company: BBC Birmingham

Original release
- Network: BBC Two
- Release: 8 January – 12 February 1998

Related
- Jeremy Clarkson's Motorworld; Speed

Jeremy Clarkson's Extreme Machines was a six-part documentary series, originally broadcast on BBC Two in 1998. The series focused on presenter Jeremy Clarkson looking at and driving some of the most impressive record-breaking powerboats, military planes, supertankers, model cars and other vehicles. A BBC Video VHS consisting of the best moments from the series was released prior to the TV premiere, on 20 October 1997.

== Episode list ==
#	Airdate	Segments	Production code
1	8 January 1998	Reno Air Races in Nevada; Formula 1 inshore powerboat racing; Private jets	NBHD001F
2	15 January 1998	Class 1 offshore powerboat racing; 17,500 mph Space Shuttle; Jahre Viking supertanker; Hot air balloon festival in Albuquerque	NBHD002A
3	22 January 1998	McDonnell Douglas F-15 Eagle aircraft; Snowmobile drag racing in Lapland; Combine harvester demolition derby in Canada	NBHD003T
4	29 January 1998	Homemade Arctic exploration vehicles; Riva Aquarama luxury boat; Hovercraft racing; Life-size model train in Little Rock, Arkansas; Apache attack helicopter	NBHD004N
5	5 February 1998	Zorb ball; Jetboats and jetsprinting in New Zealand; Commemorative Air Force; Pierre Scerri's Model Ferrari 312 PB; Davis–Monthan Air Force scrapyard in Tucson, Arizona	NBHD005H
6	12 February 1998	Swamp buggy racing in Florida; Visby class stealth warship in Sweden; Mechanical elephant; Luxury yachts; Airboats	NBHD006B
