= Pierre Scerri =

Pierre Scerri is a French telecommunications engineer and model builder, who gained fame in 1998 after having his highly accurate 1:3 scale model of a Ferrari 312 PB featured on the BBC television programme Jeremy Clarkson's Extreme Machines.

He began his project for the model in 1978, out of desire for having a Ferrari that could function in his dining room. Pierre Bardinon, owner of the Mas du Clos race track, allowed Scerri to take detailed photographs of the actual car on display at the adjacent Ferrari museum. Based on those photographs, he drafted the schematics and made the molds for all parts of the model, a process which took 15 years.

In 1989, he finally completed assembly of the engine, a perfect scaled replica of the Flat-12 cylinder engine found on the 312PB. He reportedly took extra time tuning the engine so that it would sound like the full-scale model. The project was finally completed in December 1992.

Scerri is now working on three new models, a Ferrari 330 P4, another Ferrari 312PB and an engine for a Ferrari 250 GTO, all 1:3 scale.
