= Opel Zafira =

Multi-purpose vehicle

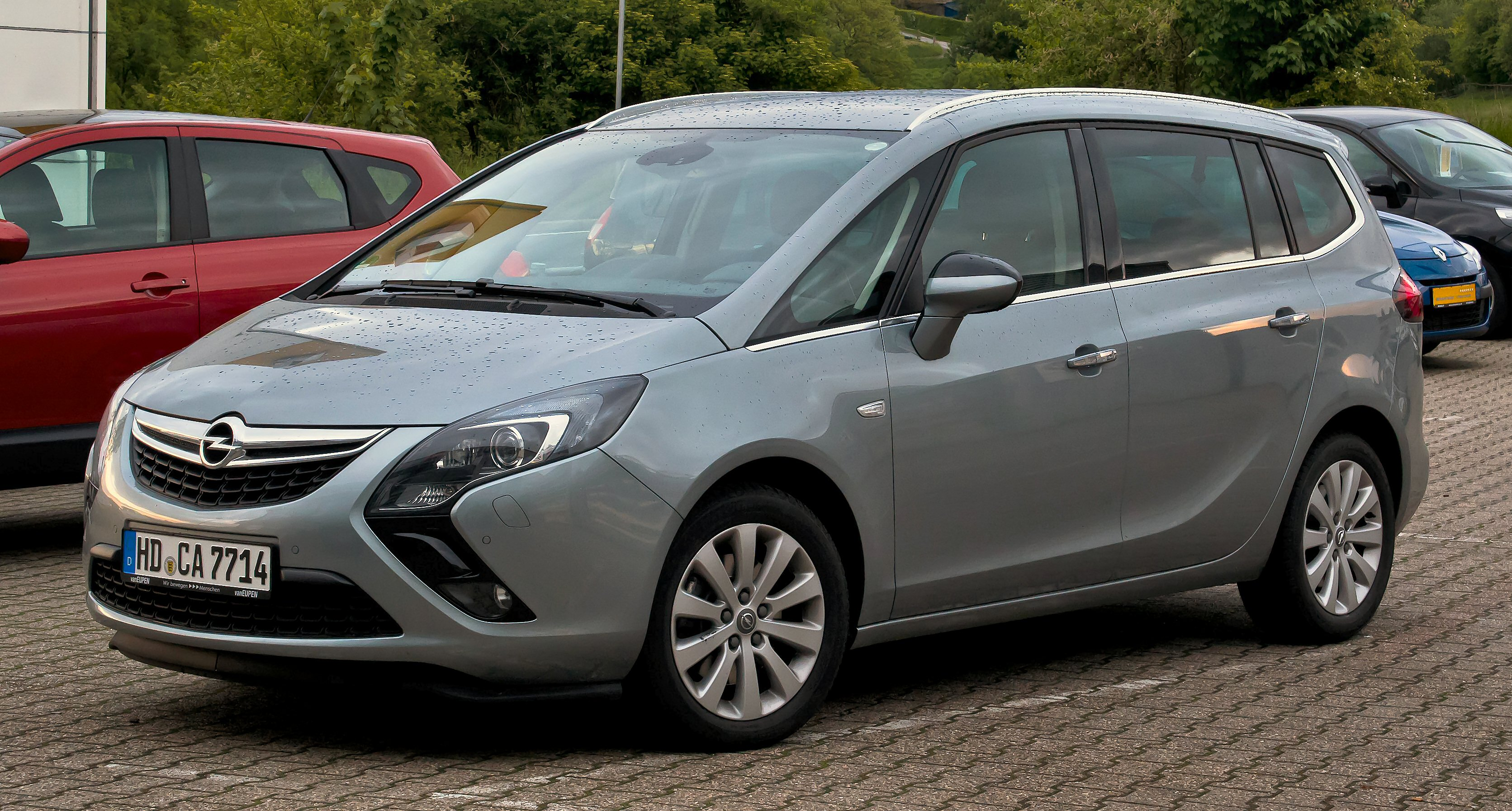

Overview
- Manufacturer: Opel (General Motors)
- Also called: Vauxhall Zafira
- Production: January 1999 – 2019 (Europe)

Body and chassis
- Class: Compact MPV (C)
- Body style: 5-door MPV
- Layout: Front-engine, front-wheel-drive

Chronology
- Predecessor: Opel Sintra
- Successor: Opel Zafira-e Life; Opel Grandland

The Opel Zafira is a car manufactured and marketed across three generations between 1999 and 2019 by Opel. Based on the Opel Astra platform, it is developed to occupy the multi-purpose vehicle (MPV) segment.

The Zafira was also marketed under the Vauxhall marque in the United Kingdom until June 2018, the Holden marque in Australia until June 2005, and under a number of other market-specific brands and names.

The name "Zafira" derives from the Arabic word meaning to succeed. Since 2011, it received an additional moniker as the Zafira Tourer.

== Zafira A (1999) ==
Zafira
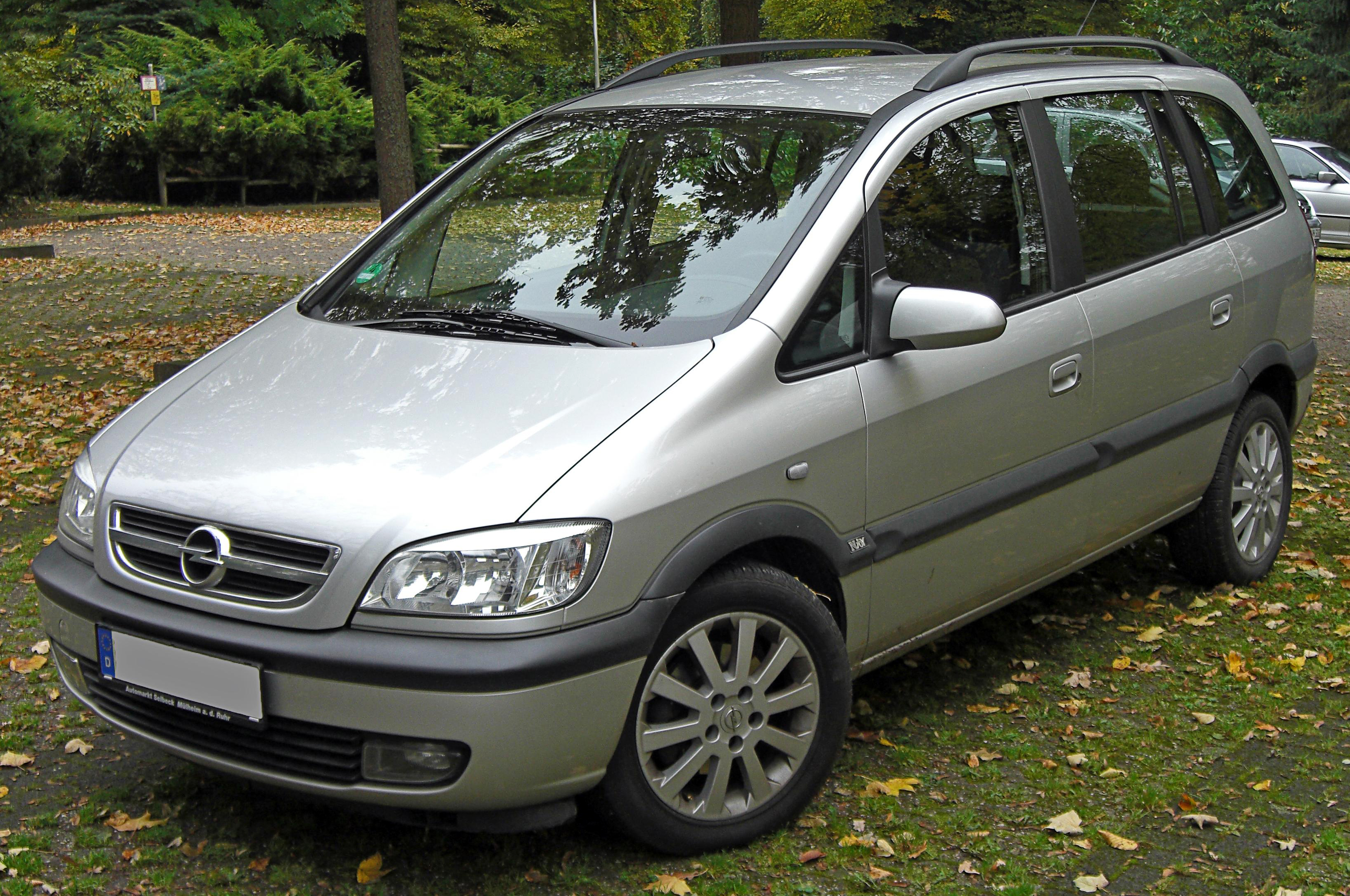

Overview
- Model code: T98
- Also called: Opel Zafira (Europe); Vauxhall Zafira (United Kingdom); Chevrolet Zafira (Brazil, Latin America, and Indonesia); Chevrolet Nabira (Malaysia); Holden Zafira (Australia and New Zealand); Subaru Traviq (Japan)
- Production: January 1999 – 2005 (Germany); 2000–2005 (Thailand); 2000-2006 (Indonesia); 2001–2012 (Brazil)
- Assembly: Germany: Bochum (Opel-Werk Bochum); Thailand: Rayong (GM Thailand); Brazil: São José dos Campos (GM Brazil)

Body and chassis
- Class: Compact MPV
- Platform: T-body platform
- Related: Opel Astra G

Powertrain
- Engine: Petrol: 1.6 L Family 1 I4; 1.8 L Family 1 I4; 2.0 L Family II turbo I4; 2.2 L Ecotec I4; Diesel: 2.0 L X20DTL/Y20DTH turbo I4; 2.2 L Y22DTR turbo I4

Dimensions
- Wheelbase: 2,694 mm (106.1 in)
- Length: 4,317 mm (170.0 in)
- Width: 1,742 mm (68.6 in)
- Height: 1,684 mm (66.3 in)
- Curb weight: 1,320–1,560 kg (2,910–3,439 lb)

Chronology
- Successor: Chevrolet Spin (South America); Subaru Exiga (for Subaru Traviq, Japan)

The first generation Zafira was internally designated as the Zafira A. Co-developed with Porsche, it debuted in concept form at the 1997 Frankfurt Auto Show and entered series production in January 1999, with sales beginning in April of that year.

The Zafira shared the T platform with the 1998 Astra G, sharing much commonality with that car. The Zafira seated seven passengers in three rows. Using a system marketed as Flex 7, the split back seat could fold into the floor to increase cargo space, without requiring removal.

Offered with a series of petrol engines and initially a single diesel offering, the "X" engines were replaced by the newer "Z" engine generation in 2000. These featured variable intake manifolds and were able to meet Euro 3 emissions standards. The 2.0-litre turbodiesels were complemented by a 125 PS (92 kW) 2.2-litre option in January 2002.

The Zafira A body was used in GM/Opel's concept hydrogen-powered fuel cell vehicle the GM HydroGen3.

A facelift was launched in February 2003 at the Geneva Motor Show.

The Zafira ranked third in the European Car of the Year for 2000, behind only the Fiat Multipla and Toyota Yaris. In TüV's ranking of the quality of three year old cars, the Zafira was by far the best Opel; only slightly behind the winning Ford Focus.

Zafira A production ended on 25 May 2005, in Bochum. It was replaced by Zafira B in Europe, but was still sold in most other markets until 2012 (albeit that its cousin the Chevrolet Astra was discontinued in 2011), except for Australia and New Zealand, where the model was cancelled altogether.

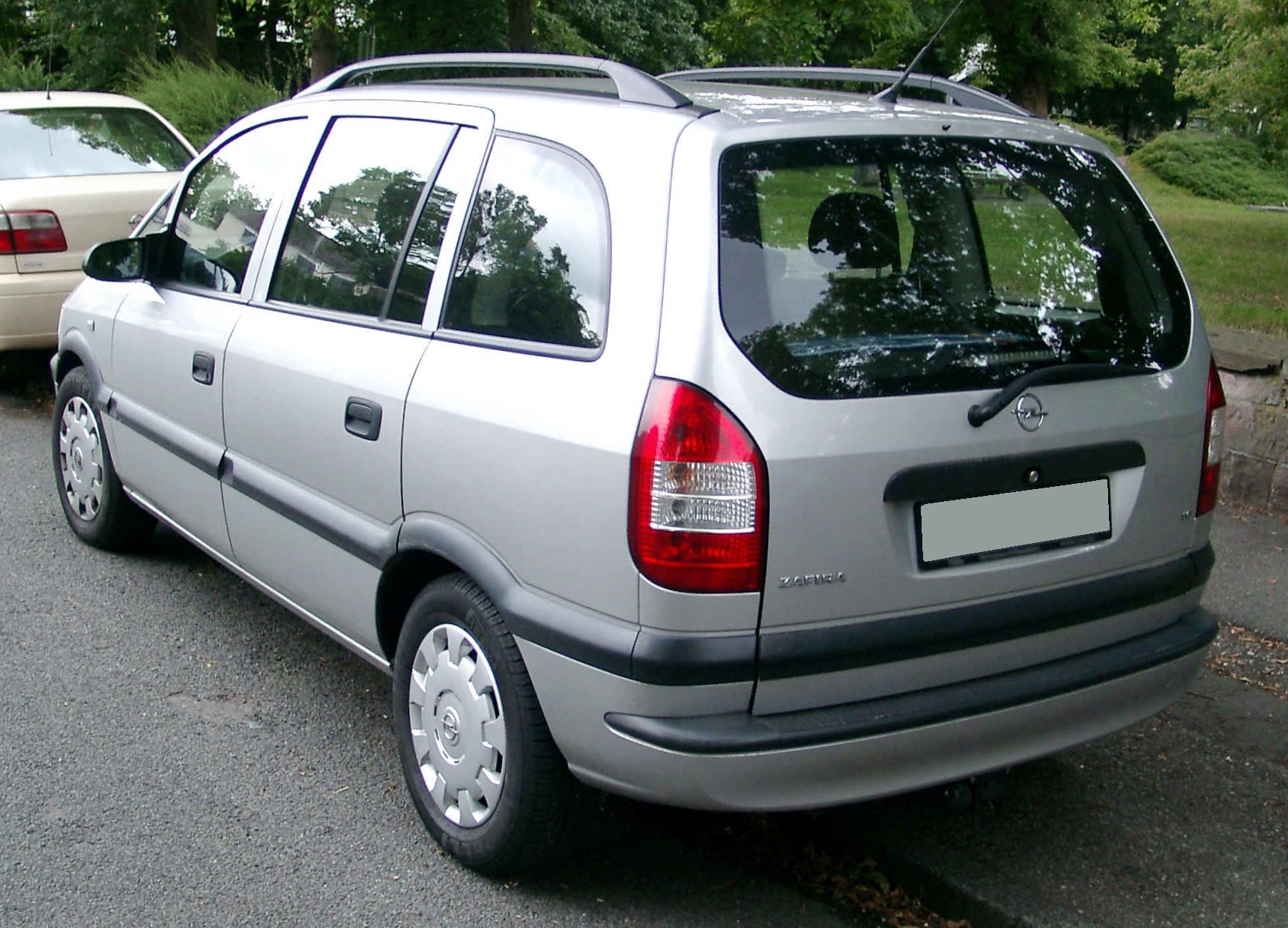
Opel Zafira A

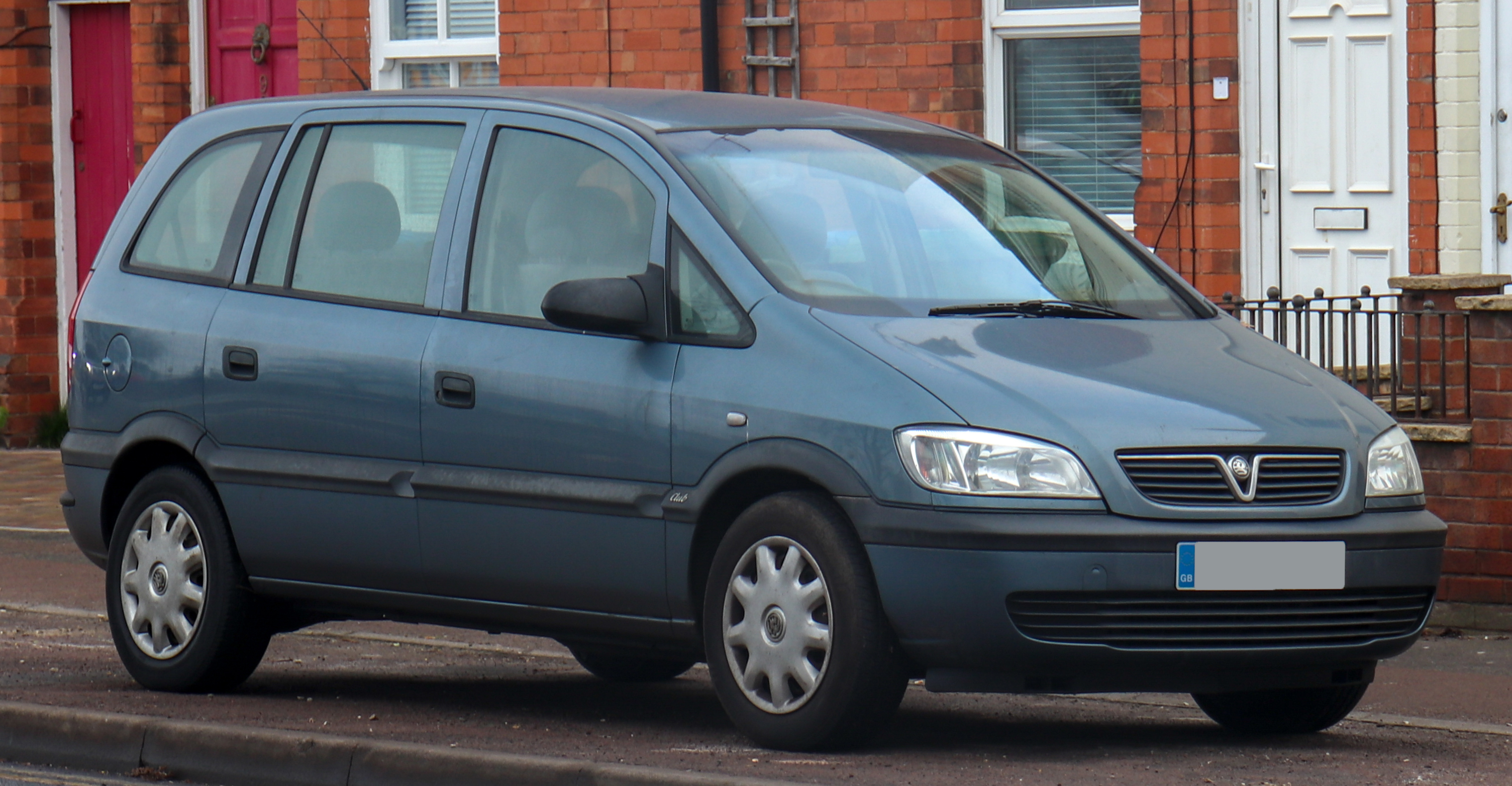
Vauxhall Zafira (UK, pre-facelift)

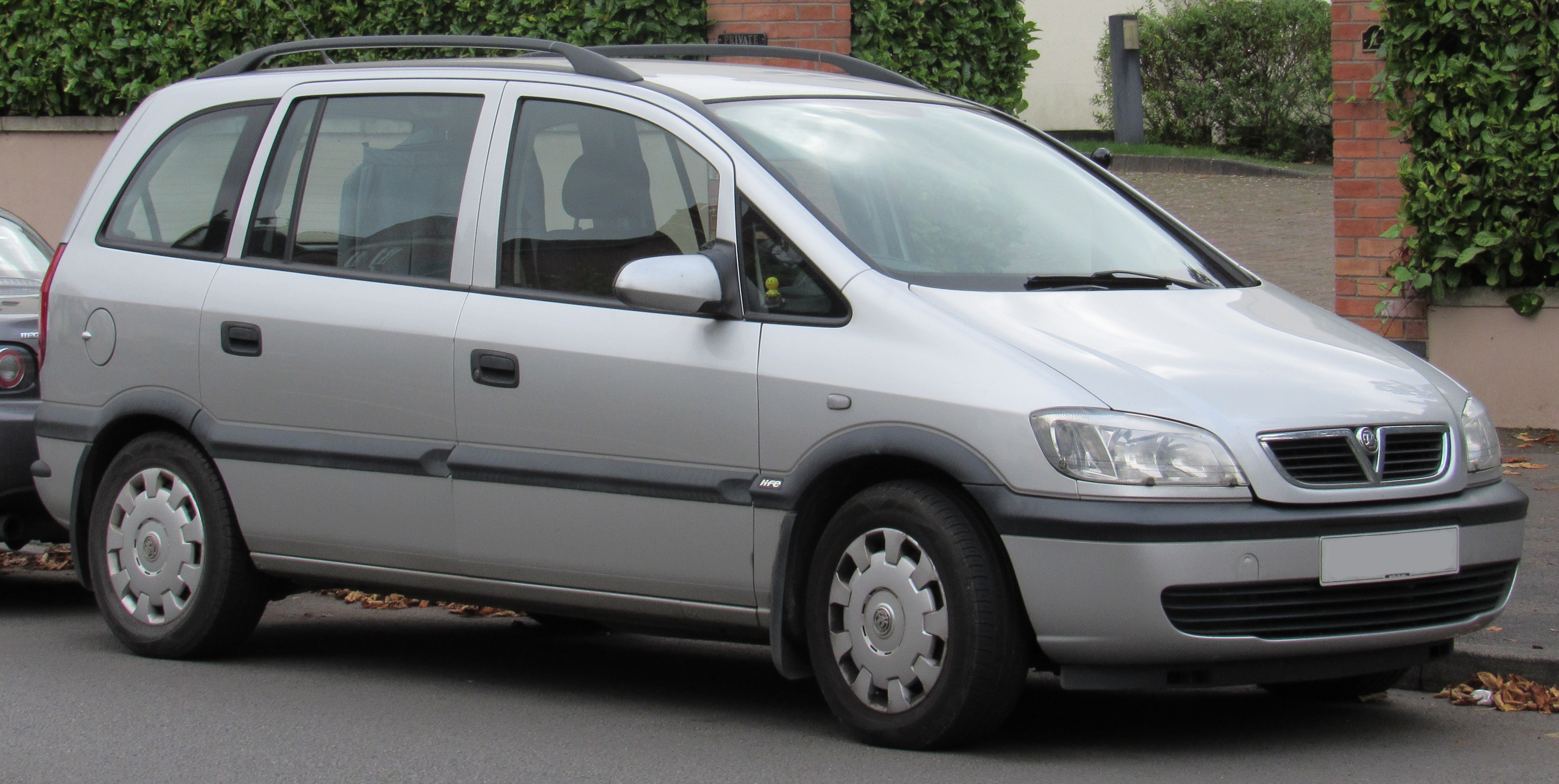
Vauxhall Zafira (UK, facelift)

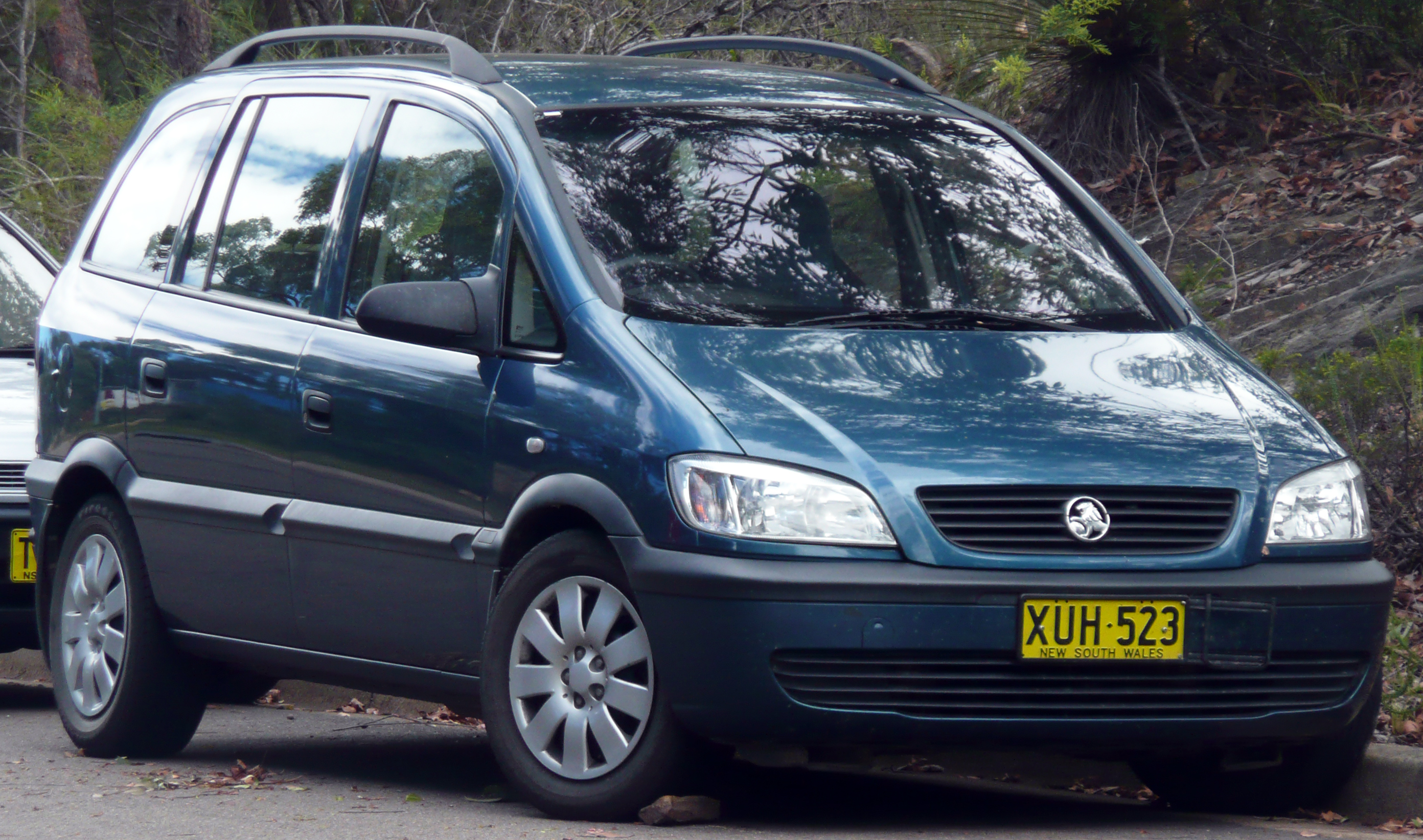
Holden Zafira (Australia, pre-facelift)

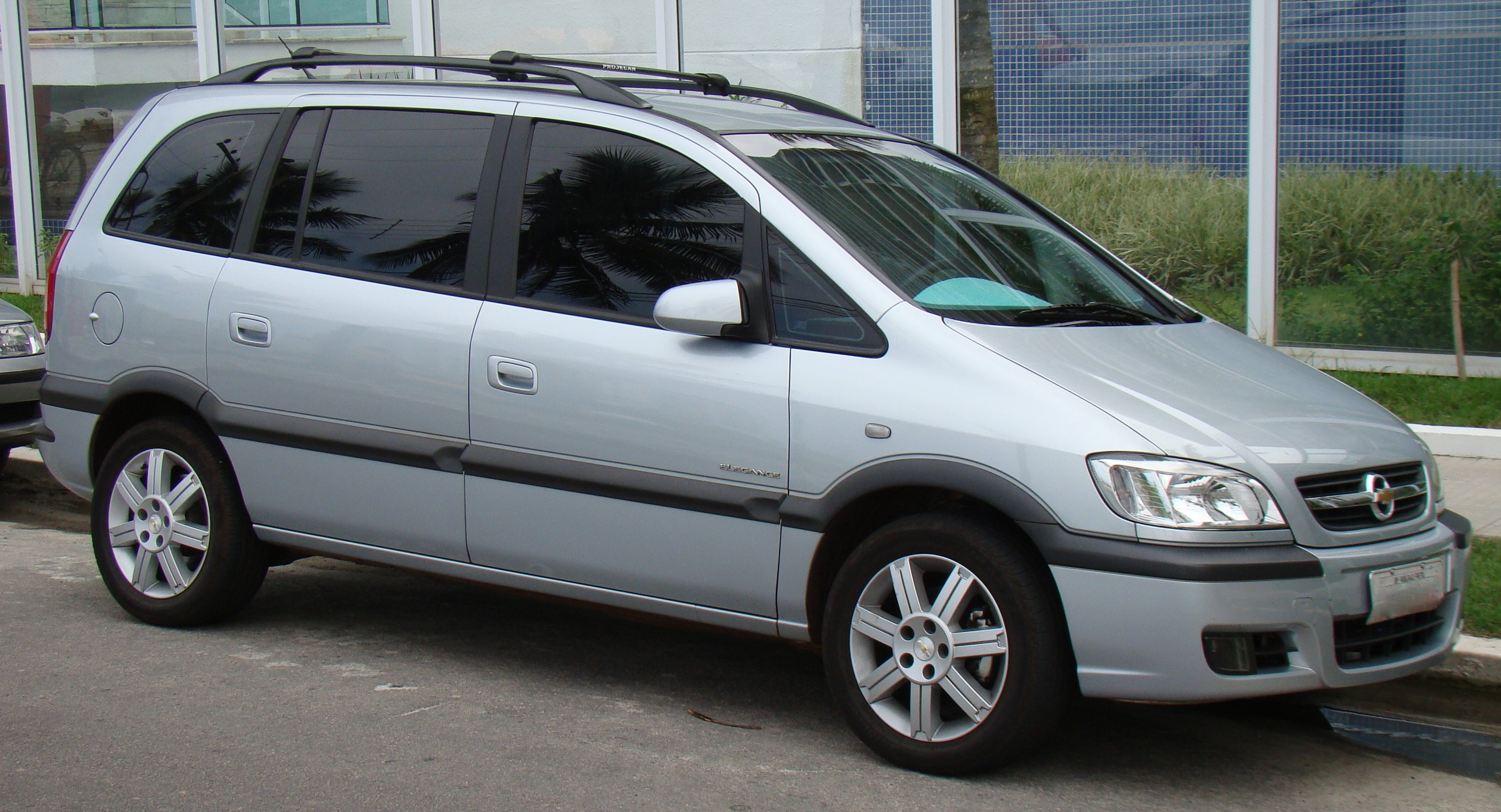
Chevrolet Zafira (Brazil)

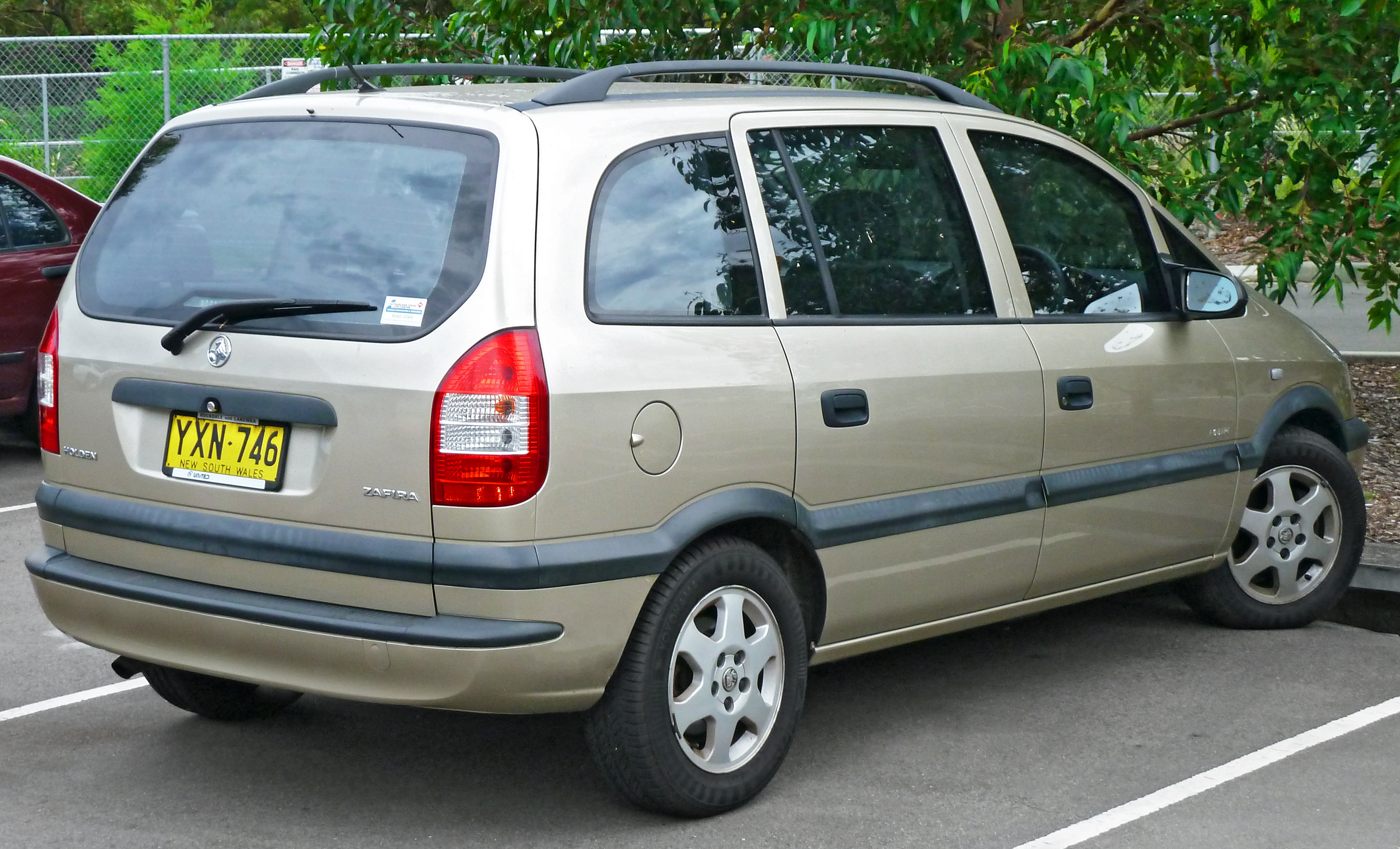
2003 Holden Zafira

=== Zafira OPC ===
Introduced at Geneva in February 2001, the turbocharged Zafira OPC went on sale in October 2001. With 192 PS (141 kW), this was the fastest minivan on sale in Europe. Only available with a five speed manual transmission, 0–100 km/h (62 mph) can be reached in 8.2 seconds and the top speed is 220 km/h (137 mph).

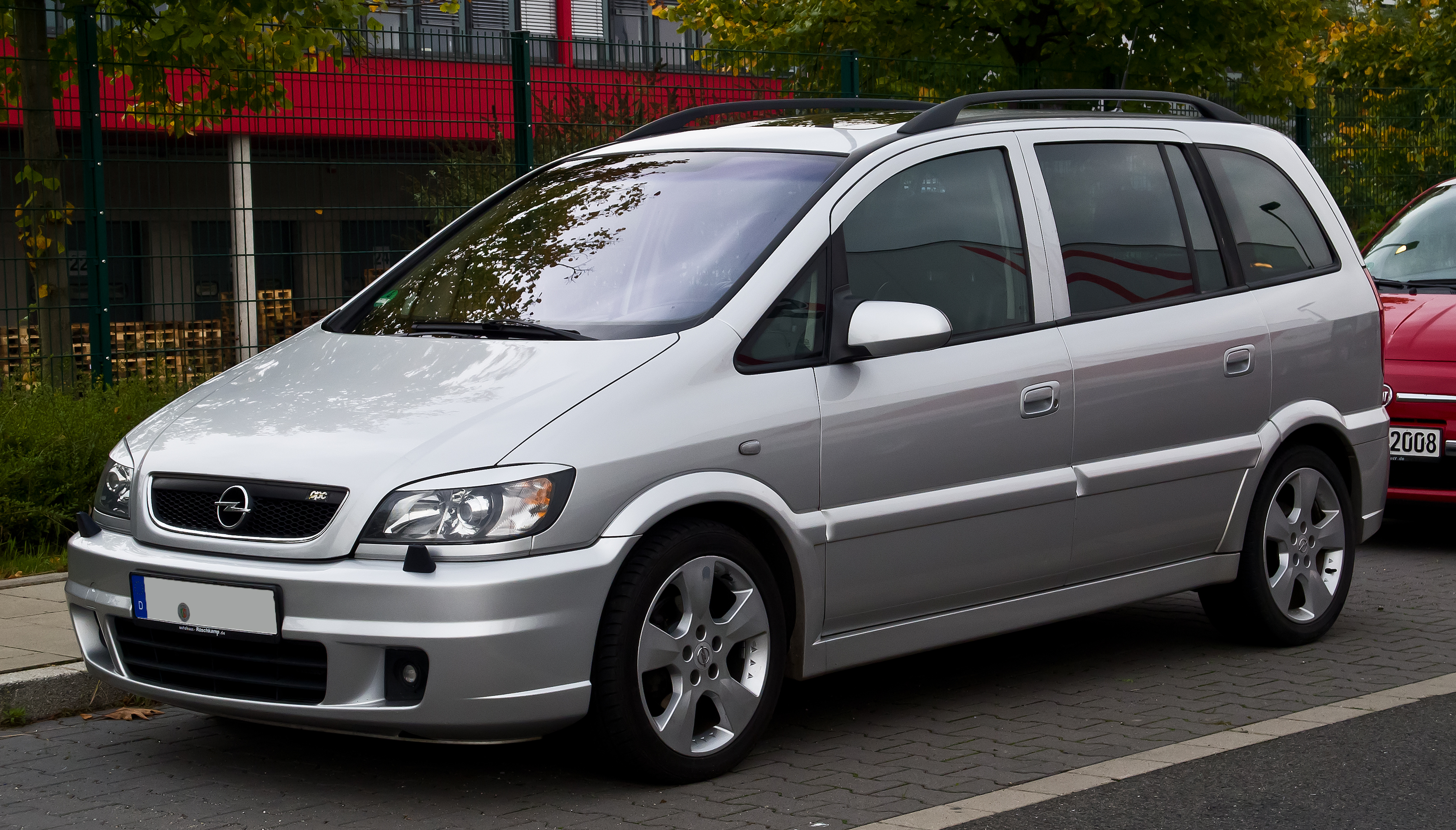
Opel Zafira A OPC

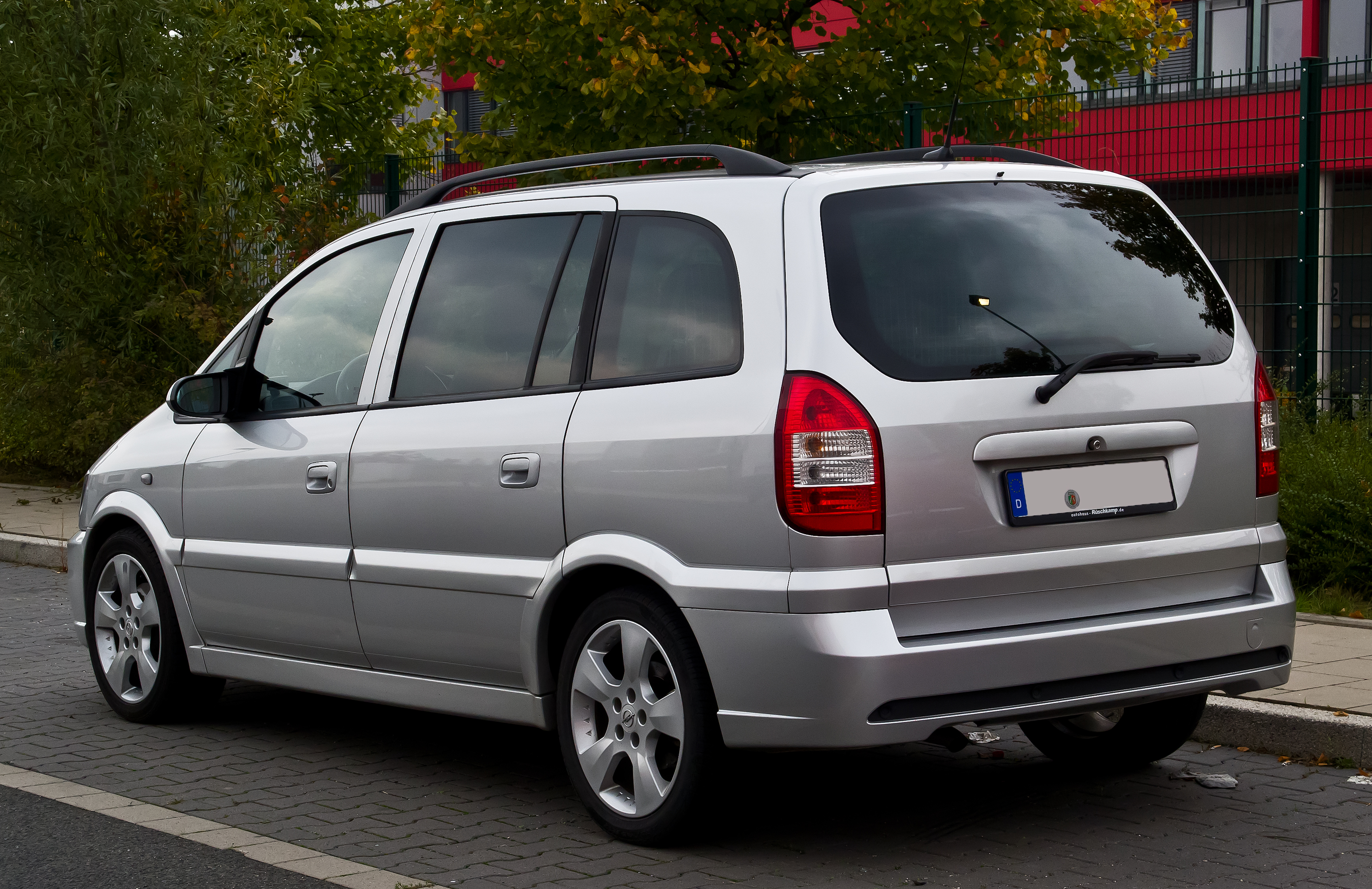
Rear view

=== Markets ===
The Zafira was marketed in the Philippines from 2001 to 2005, as the last Europe-based Opel marketed in the Philippines after they stopped selling the Opel Astra in 2003. Although sold as the Chevrolet Zafira, it was sold alongside other Opel vehicles until the Opel name was pulled out of the Philippine-market by its distributor, GM Philippines.

The Zafira was produced and sold in the Thailand from 2000 to 2005. it was sold alongside other Opel vehicles until the Opel name was pulled out of the Thai-market by its distributor, GM Thailand. Thailand’s domestic family wagon segment with 3,946 units sold.

The Chevrolet Zafira was launched in Indonesia in 2000. The 1.8-litre GM Family 1 engine was the only engine option. It was initially sold in two trims called GL and CD. In 2004, a new trim named "Elegance" was added to the lineup. The Elegance trim consisted of a two-tone body color, leather seats, and other accessories. The Zafira was pulled out of the Indonesian market in 2006, with no direct successor.

The Zafira A was sold in Malaysia as the Chevrolet Nabira.

=== Subaru Traviq ===
The Zafira was sold in Japan from August 2001 through to November 2004 as the Subaru Traviq alongside the standard Opel vehicle. In exchange, Subaru supplied the Subaru Forester as the Chevrolet Forester in India since 2003.

According to Subaru, the Traviq name was a combination of the words "travel" and "quick". Imported from Thailand, the Traviq was originally only available with the bigger 2.2 litre engine, although a 1.8 L, lower priced alternative was added in July 2003. The engines used were not Subaru supplied boxer engines, but were conventional in line units that were uncharacteristic to market recognised Subaru products, and all-wheel drive was also not available.

The sale of the Zafira as a Subaru created a conflict with previously established Yanase Co., Ltd. retail dealerships, in that Yanase was already selling Opel products, like the Zafira. When production of the Traviq ended, Yanase continued to import Opel products into Japan until 2006. It was replaced later in 2008 by the Subaru Exiga – developed from the Subaru Legacy platform.

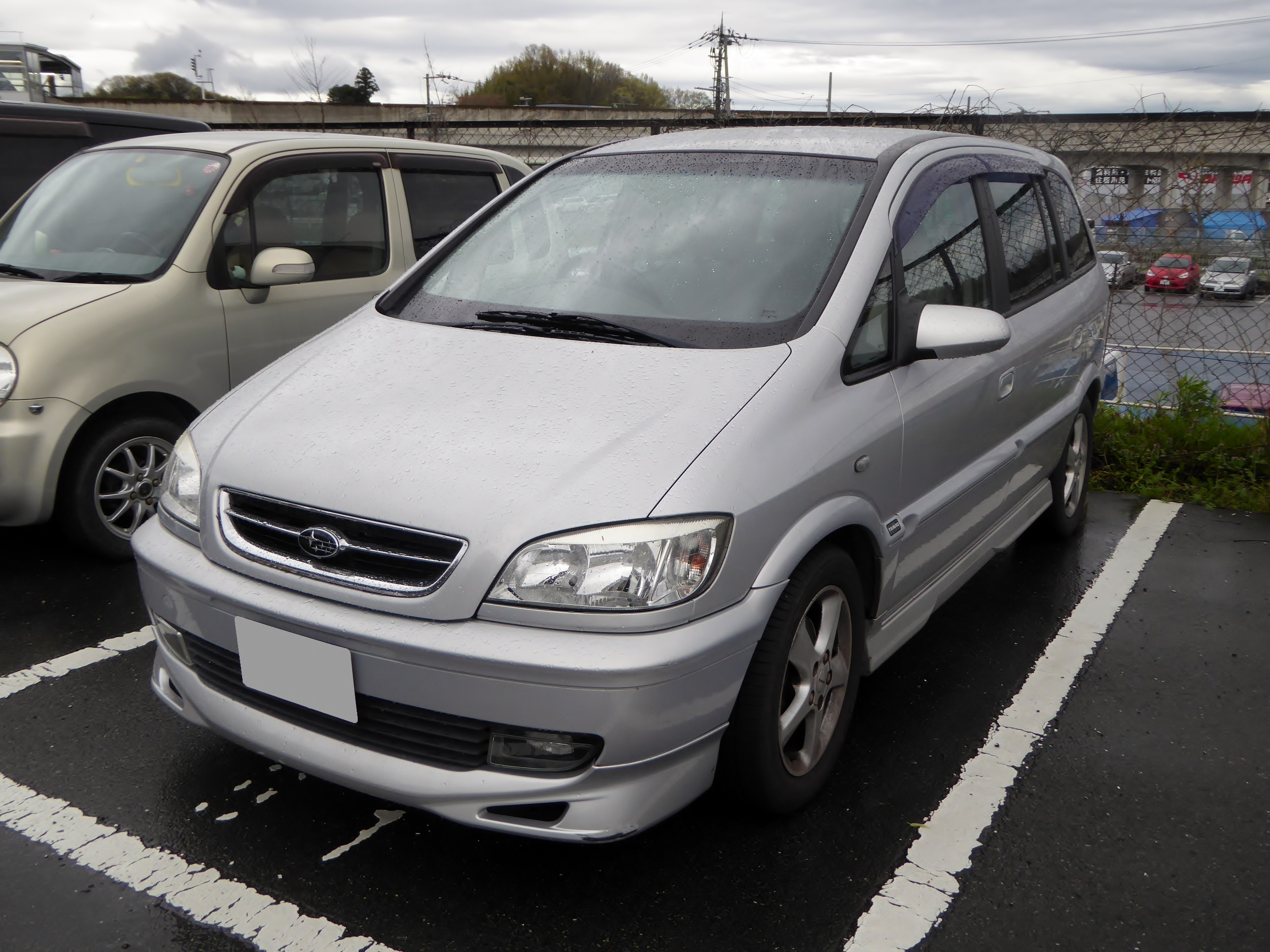
Subaru Traviq (Japan)

== Zafira B (2005) ==
Zafira B
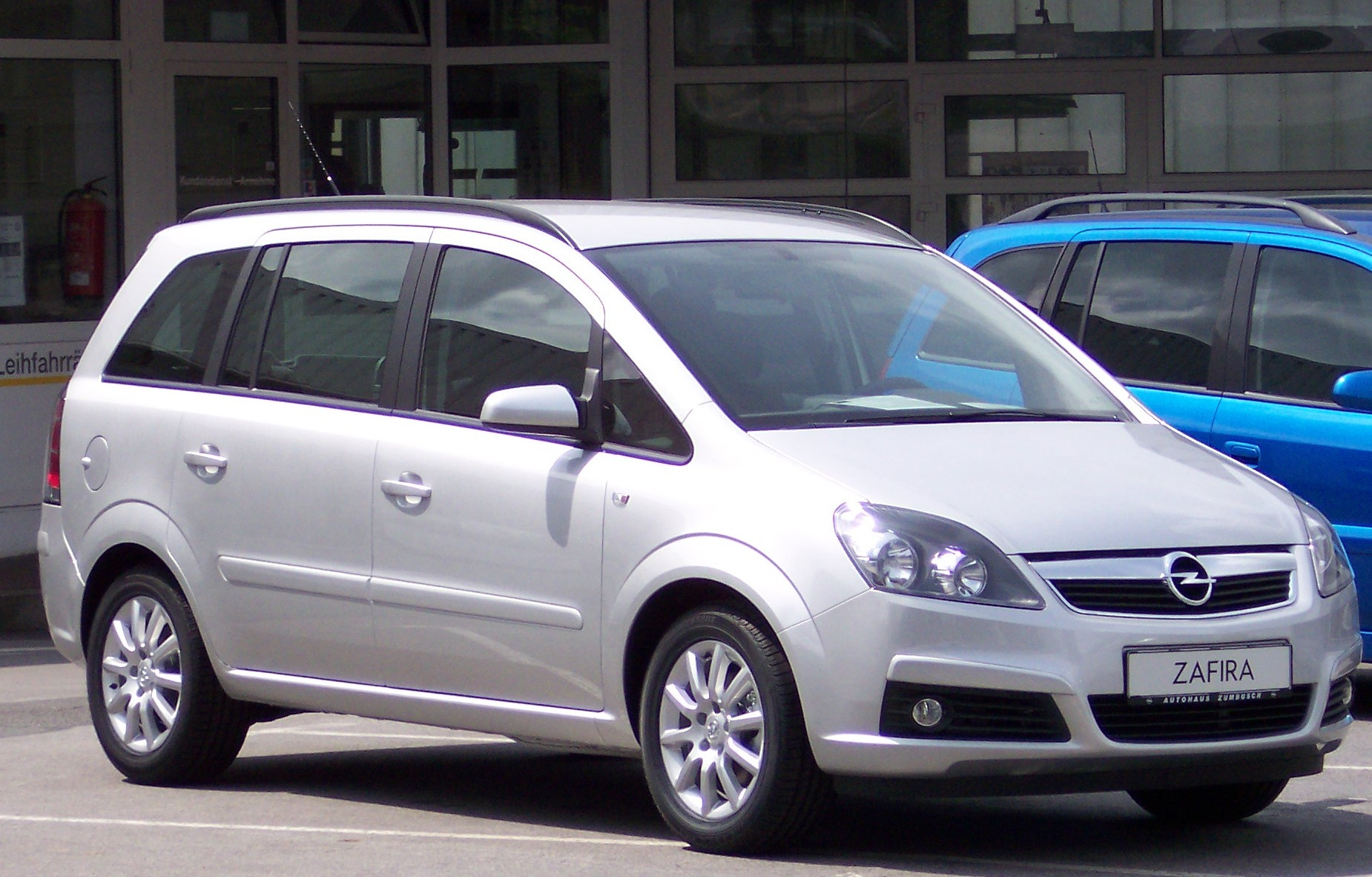
- Opel Zafira B (2005–2009)

Overview
- Model code: A05
- Also called: Vauxhall Zafira (UK); Chevrolet Zafira; Opel Zafira Family (2011–2014)
- Production: 2005–2014; 2012–2014 (Russia)
- Assembly: Germany: Bochum; Poland: Gliwice; Russia: Kaliningrad

Body and chassis
- Class: Compact MPV
- Platform: T platform
- Related: Opel Astra H

Powertrain
- Engine: Petrol: 1.6 L Family 1 I4; 1.8 L Family 1 I4; 2.0 L Ecotec turbo I4; 2.2 L Ecotec I4; Diesel: 1.7 L CDTi I4; 1.9 L CDTi I4
- Transmission: 5-speed manual 6-speed manual (Note: OPC version only.); 6-speed automatic 5-speed Easytronic

Dimensions
- Wheelbase: 2,703 mm (106.4 in)
- Length: 4,468 mm (175.9 in)
- Width: 1,801 mm (70.9 in)
- Height: 1,801 mm (70.9 in) (2006–2008); 1,636 mm (64.4 in) (2009–present)

Chronology
- Successor: Chevrolet HHR (Mexico); Chevrolet Orlando (Chile)

The second generation Zafira, internally designated Zafira B, debuted in Europe on 12 February 2005, with sales starting on 9 June 2005. It shared the platform and mechanical parts with the Opel Astra H. In February 2007, the Zafira B was launched in Singapore. By March 2007, the model had only been introduced in Europe and Singapore.

It went on sale in Mexico in April 2006, and Chile in September 2007. In both countries, it was branded as the Chevrolet Zafira. Although this generation was replaced in the end of 2011 by the Zafira C, this model remained in production until May 2014 as the Zafira Family. This name change occurred in markets including Germany.

The model was previewed as concept car named Opel Zafira Snowtrekker in 2000 and debuted at January 2000 Detroit Auto Show.

=== Names and markets ===
- Vauxhall Zafira – United Kingdom
- Chevrolet Zafira – Chile and Mexico
- Opel Zafira – Europe (except for United Kingdom), Japan, China, Hong Kong, Singapore, Taiwan & South Africa

In Mexico the Chevrolet Zafira was discontinued after the 2006 model year, and replaced by the five-passenger Chevrolet HHR.

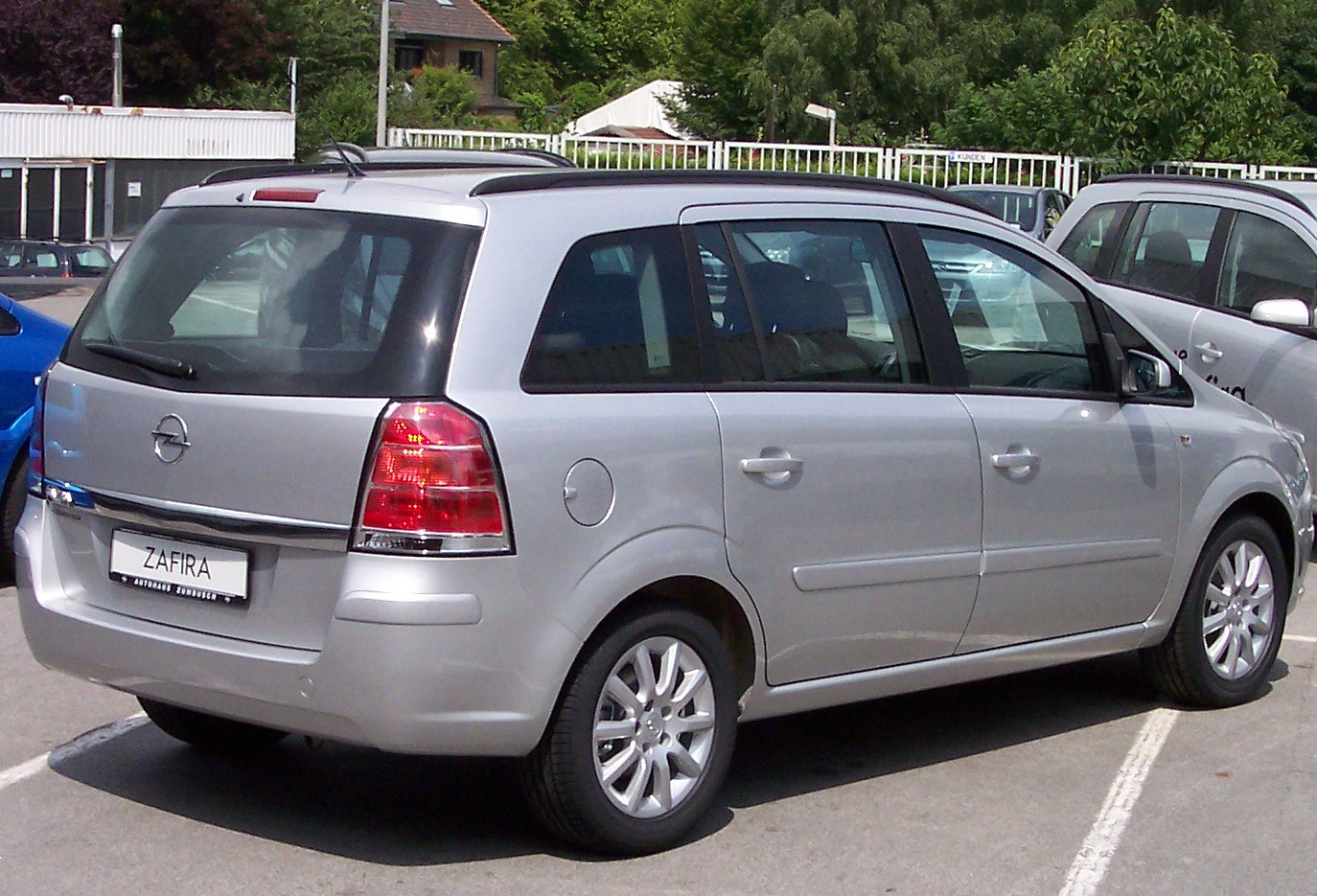
Opel Zafira B (2005–2009)

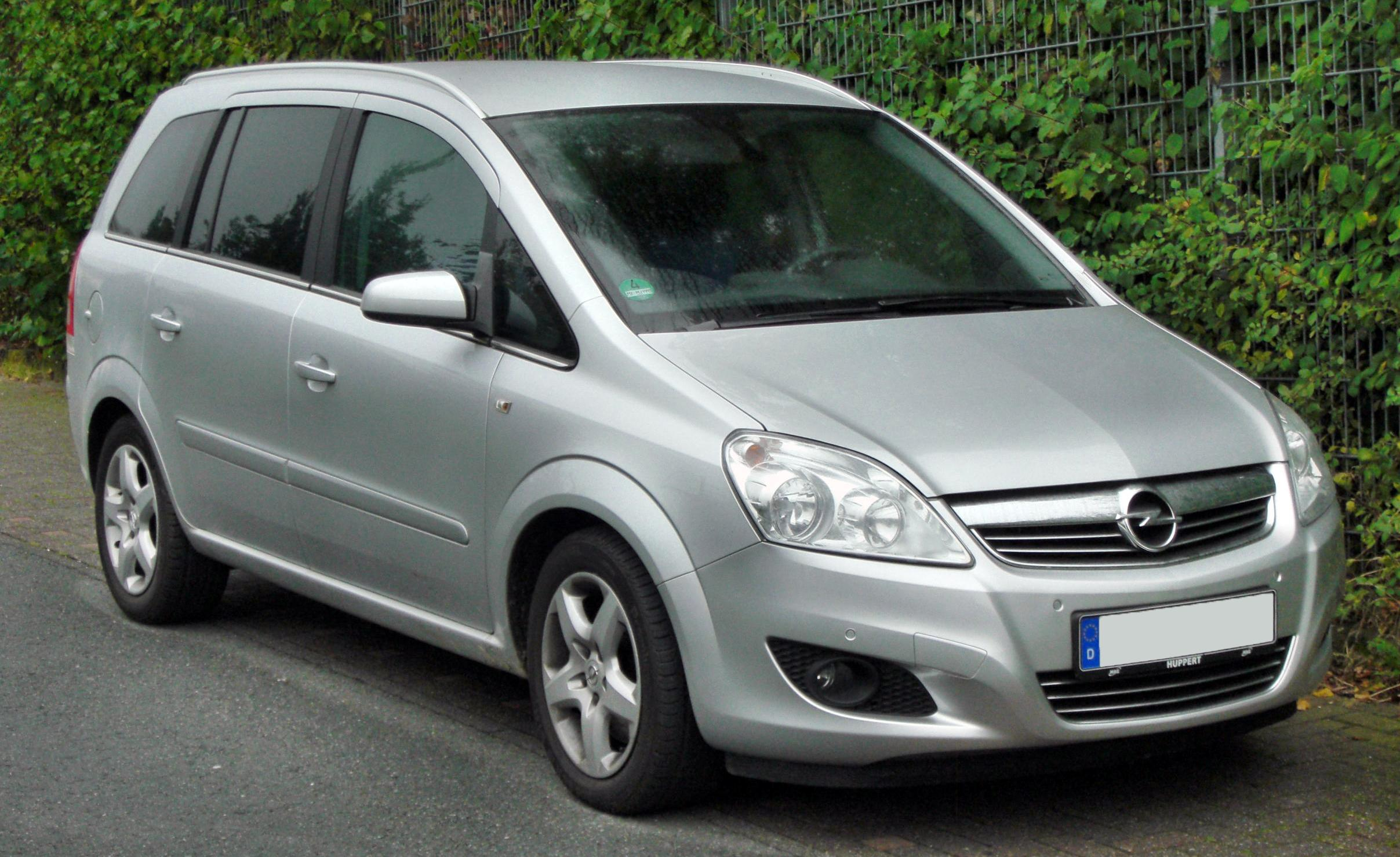
Opel Zafira B (2009–2014)

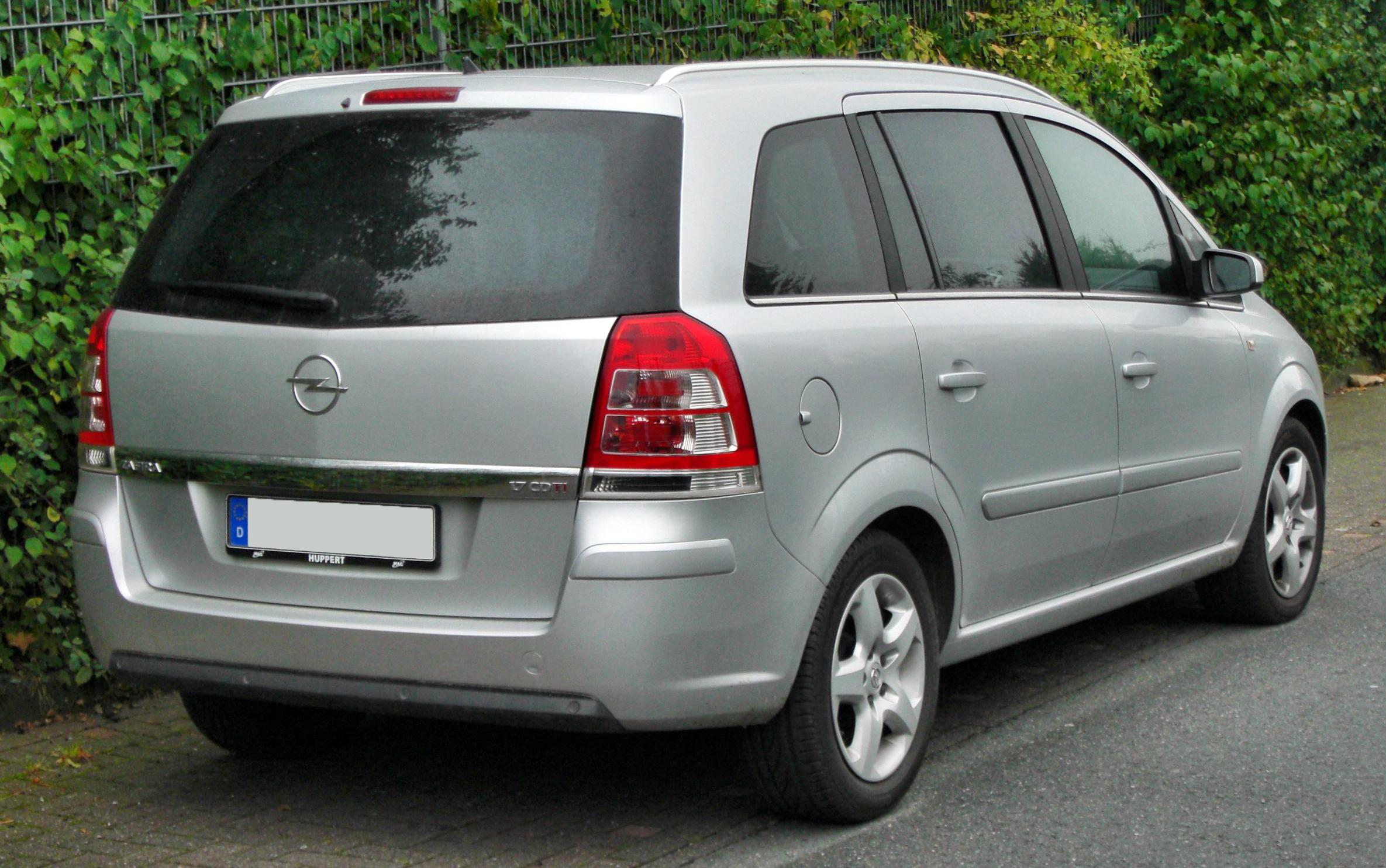
Rear view (2009–2014)

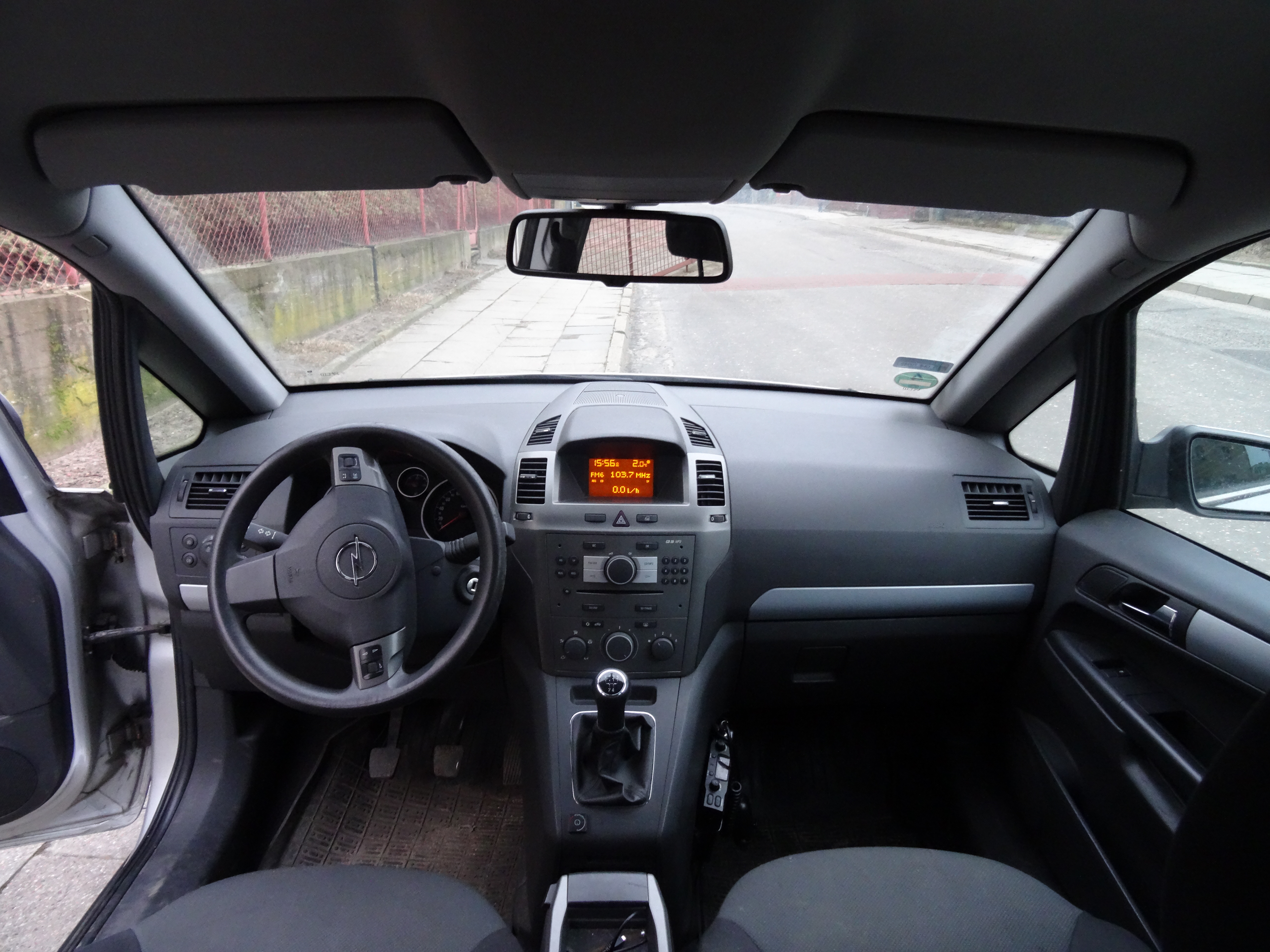
Dashboard (Opel Zafira B 2006)

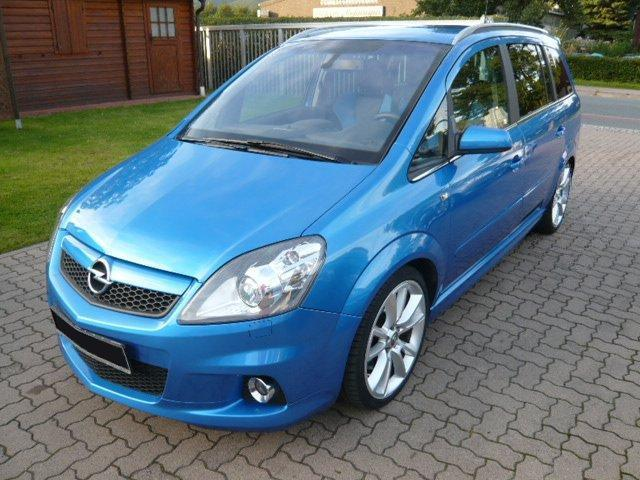
Opel Zafira OPC
(2009–2011)

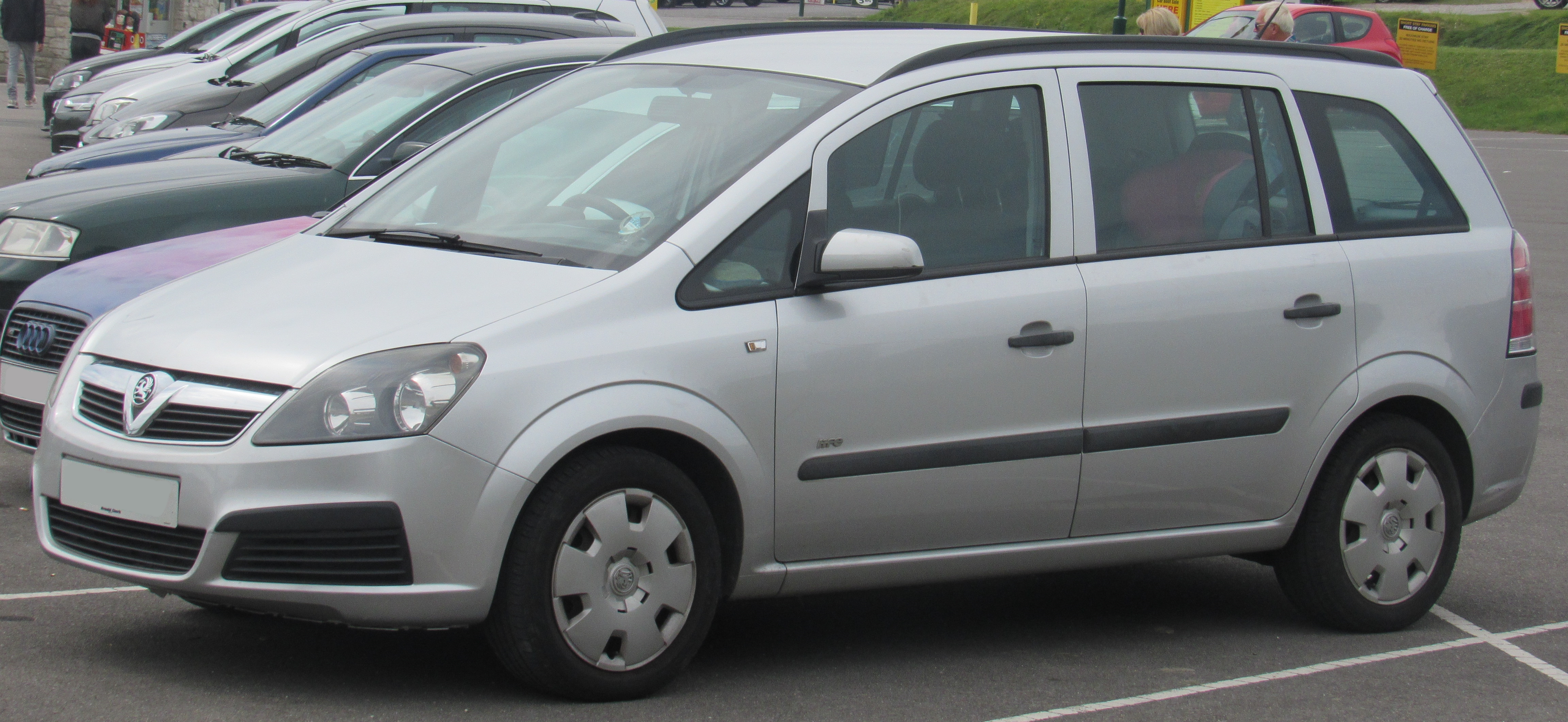
Vauxhall Zafira (United Kingdom) (2005–2009)

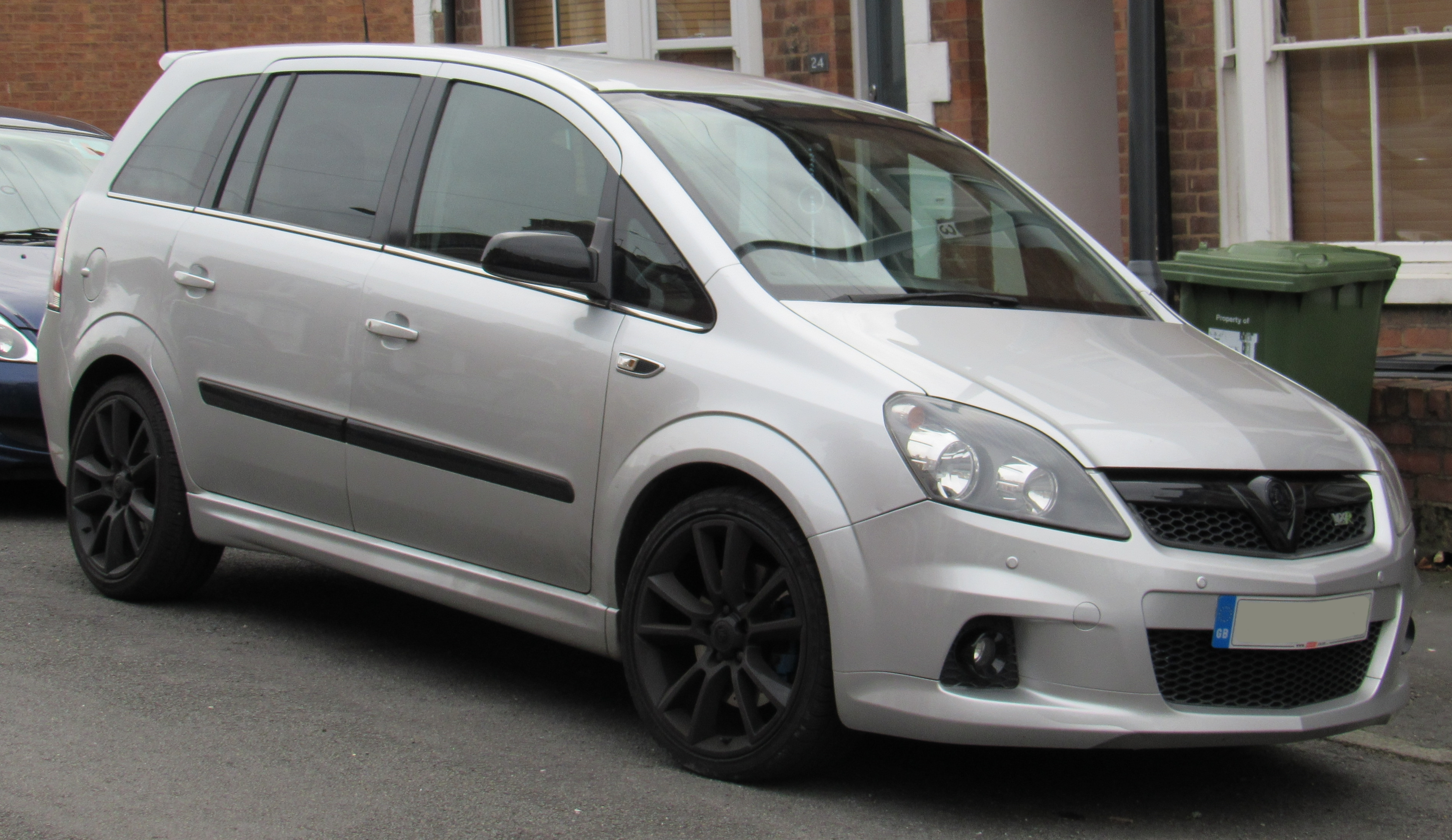
Vauxhall Zafira VXR (United Kingdom) (2005–2009)

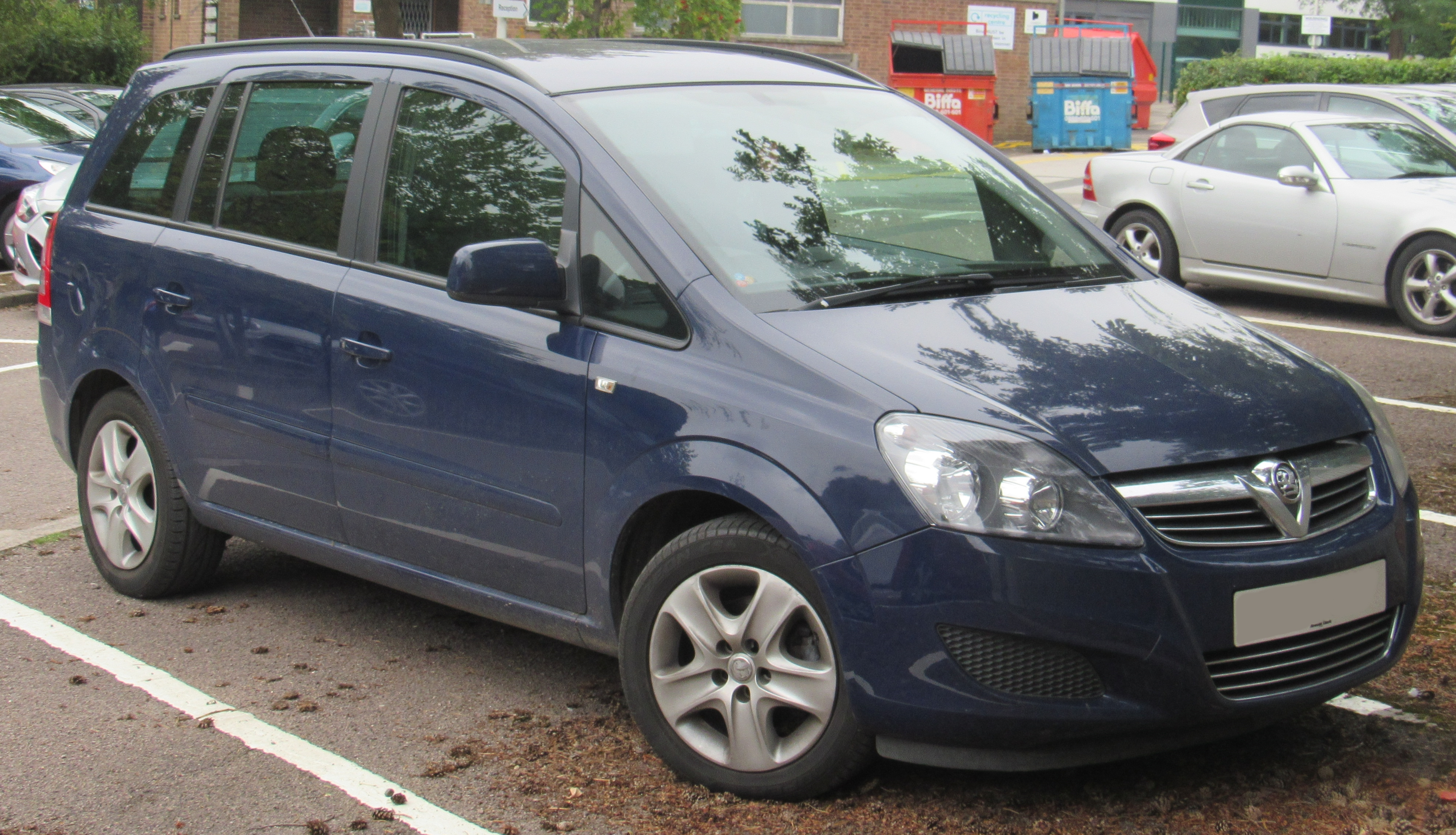
Vauxhall Zafira (United Kingdom) (2009–2014)

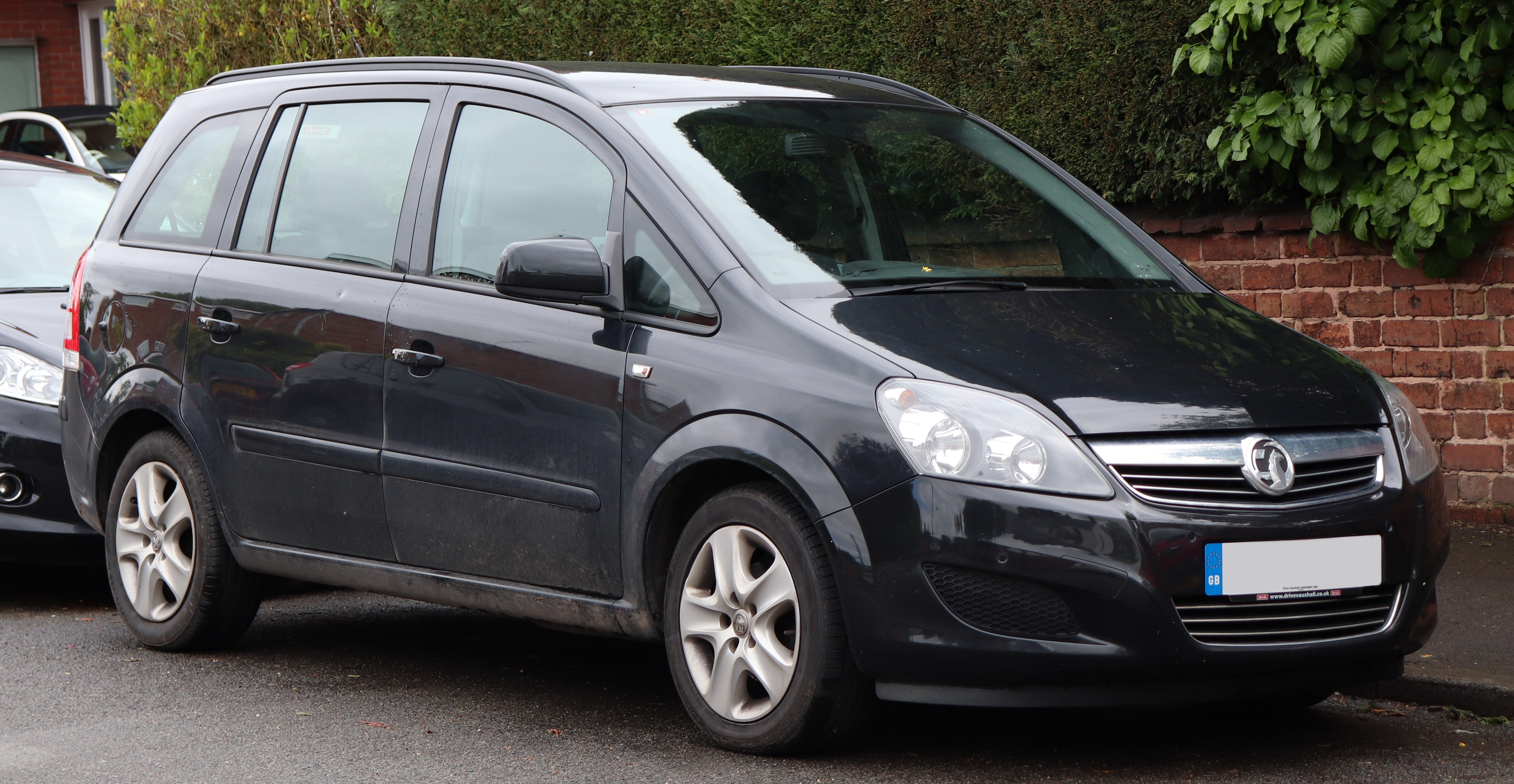
Vauxhall Zafira (With new badge design) (United Kingdom)

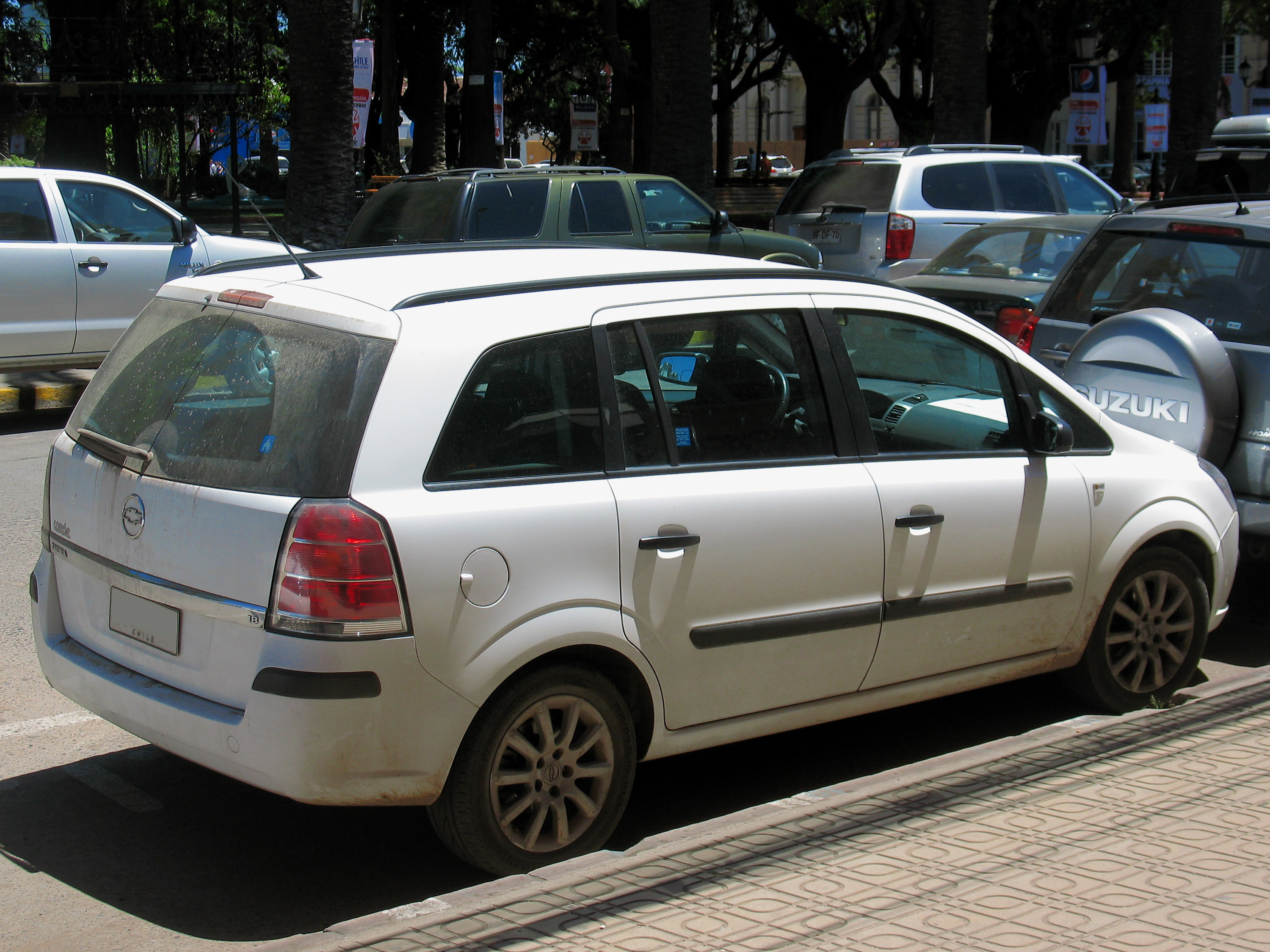
Chevrolet Zafira B (2005-2009)

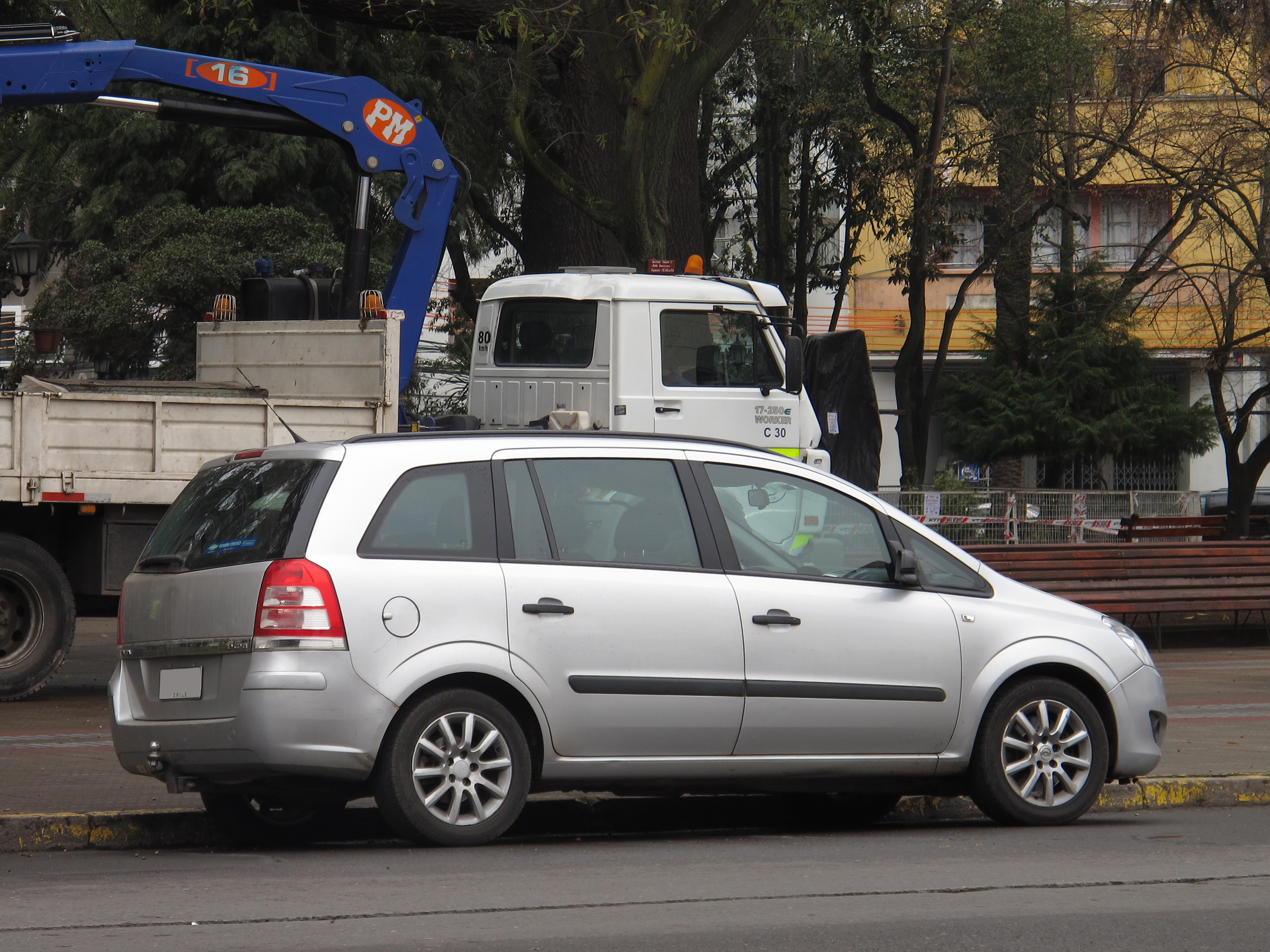
Chevrolet Zafira B (2009-2014)

=== Engines ===
The Zafira B's engine line was partly carried over from the previous Astra/Zafira generation. Opel replaced the 2.0 and 2.2 turbodiesel I4 engines with 1.9 L common rail turbodiesels developed by Fiat (Multijet). Opel Performance Center developed a turbocharged 240 hp (180 kW) 2.0 L performance version of the Zafira B as well. A CNG (Compressed Natural Gas) version of the new Zafira with a 1.6 L engine is also available.

Petrol engine
| Model | Engine | Displacement | Power | Torque | CO_{2} emission (g/km) | Years | Notes |
|---|---|---|---|---|---|---|---|
| 1.6 TwinPort | I4 | 1,598 cc | 105 PS (77 kW; 104 hp) at 6,000 rpm | 150 N⋅m (111 lb⋅ft) at 4,000 rpm | 172 | (2005–08) | EU4 |
| 1.6 TwinPort | I4 | 1,598 cc | 115 PS (85 kW; 113 hp) at 6,000 rpm | 155 N⋅m (114 lb⋅ft) at 4,000 rpm | 157 | (2008–11) | EU5 |
| 1.8 VVT | I4 | 1,796 cc | 140 PS (103 kW; 138 hp) at 6,300 rpm | 175 N⋅m (129 lb⋅ft) at 3,800 rpm | 168 | (2005–11) | EU5 |
| 2.2 VVT | I4 | 2,198 cc | 150 PS (110 kW; 148 hp) at 6,000 rpm | 215 N⋅m (159 lb⋅ft) at 4,000 rpm | 197 | (2005–10) | EU4 |
| 2.0 Turbo | I4 | 1,998 cc | 200 PS (147 kW; 197 hp) at 4,900–6,000 rpm | 262 N⋅m (193 lb⋅ft) at 1,850–4,900 rpm | 228 | (2005–09) | EU4 |
| 2.0 Turbo | I4 | 1,998 cc | 240 PS (177 kW; 237 hp) at 6,000 rpm | 320 N⋅m (236 lb⋅ft) | 230 | (2005–10) | EU4 |
Diesel engine
| Model | Engine | Displacement | Power | Torque | CO_{2} emission (g/km) | Years | Notes |
| 1.7 CDTI Ecotec | I4 | 1,686 cc | 110 PS (81 kW; 108 hp) at 4,000 rpm | 260 N⋅m (192 lb⋅ft) at 1,750–2,500 rpm | 134 | 2009–11 | EU5 |
| 1.7 CDTI Ecotec | I4 | 1,686 cc | 125 PS (92 kW; 123 hp) at 4,000 rpm | 280 N⋅m (207 lb⋅ft) at 1,750–3,500 rpm | 134 | 2010–11 | EU5 |
| 1.9 CDTI Ecotec | I4 | 1,910 cc | 120 PS (88 kW; 118 hp) at 4,000 rpm | 280 N⋅m (207 lb⋅ft) at 2,000–2,500 rpm | 167 | 2005 | EU3 |
| 1.9 CDTI Ecotec | I4 | 1,910 cc | 120 PS (88 kW; 118 hp) at 4,000 rpm | 280 N⋅m (207 lb⋅ft) at 1,700–2,550 rpm | 159 | 2005–10 | EU4 |
| 1.9 CDTI Ecotec | I4 | 1,910 cc | 150 PS (110 kW; 148 hp) at 4,000 rpm | 315 N⋅m (232 lb⋅ft) at 2,000–2,500 rpm | 167 | 2005 | EU3 |
| 1.9 CDTI Ecotec | I4 | 1,910 cc | 150 PS (110 kW; 148 hp) at 4,000 rpm | 315 N⋅m (232 lb⋅ft) at 2,000–2,500 rpm | 159 | 2005–10 | EU4 |

=== Fire issues and recalls ===
In November 2015, the London Fire Brigade issued an alert in response to a "spike" in reports of fires with the model.

In December 2015, safety officials in the United Kingdom asked Vauxhall to initiate a full safety recall of the model Zafira B, due to a worrying level of car fires apparently or alleged to have been caused by 'Improper Repairs'.

The fires continued, even those recalled, and a second full safety recall was announced in May 2016, with all owners advised not to use the fan in speeds regulated by the "resistor pack" which contained a solder based unreliable safety critical thermal fuse, until the second recall, starting August 2016, had been carried out.

On 3 May 2018, a criminal investigation into Vauxhall's handling of the fires of the Zafira B and recalls was launched in the United Kingdom.

On 31 August 2019, major damage occurred in a parking garage in Cork, Ireland when an Opel Zafira caught fire.

On 7 January 2020, there was a spontaneous fire in an Opel Zafira, which caused over 200 to 300 cars in a parking garage at Stavanger Airport, Sola to be destroyed. No people were harmed.

== Zafira C/Zafira Tourer (2011) ==
Zafira C/Zafira Tourer
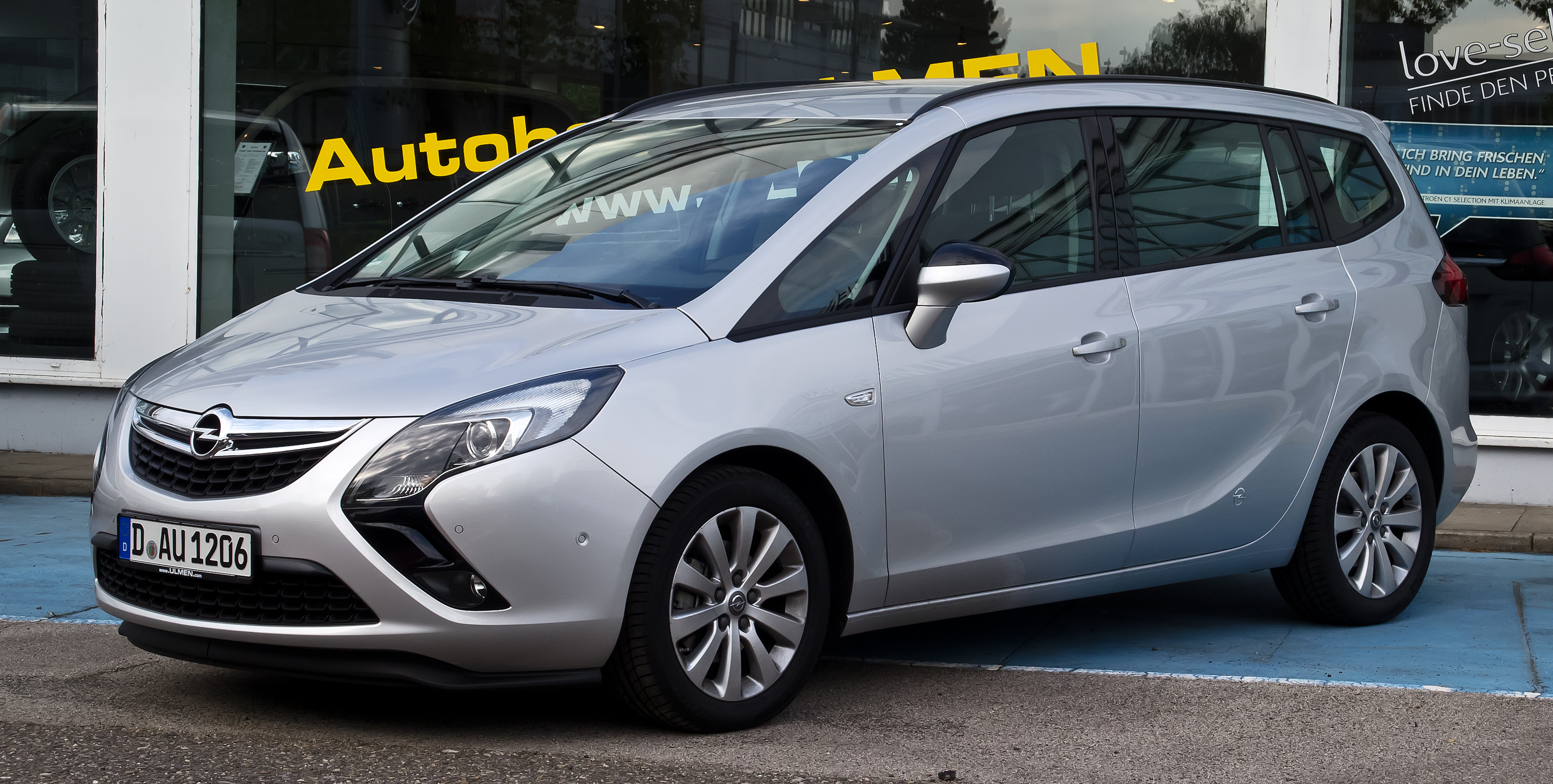

Overview
- Model code: A11
- Also called: Opel Zafira Tourer (Europe); Vauxhall Zafira Tourer (UK)
- Production: 2011–2019 (Opel); 2012–2018 (Vauxhall)
- Assembly: Germany: Bochum (Note: Until 2014.); Germany: Rüsselsheim (Note: From 2014.); Russia: Kaliningrad (2012–2015)
- Designer: Quentin Huber (FL, exterior)

Body and chassis
- Class: Compact MPV
- Platform: Delta II platform
- Related: Opel Astra J Opel Cascada; Chevrolet Orlando (first generation)

Powertrain
- Engine: Petrol: 1.4 L A14NEL (LUH)/U14NFT I4 turbo 1.6 L A16XHT (LVP) / A16SHT/B16SHT (LWC) I4; 1.8 L VVT I4; Petrol CNG: 1.6 L GM Opel A16XNT I4; Petrol LPG: 1.4 L A14NET I4; Diesel: 1.6 L CDTI I4; 2.0 L CDTI/CDTI ecoFLEX/CDTI Bi-Turbo I4
- Transmission: 5-speed manual 6-speed manual 6-speed automatic

Dimensions
- Wheelbase: 2,760 mm (108.7 in)
- Length: 4,660 mm (183.5 in)
- Width: 1,820 mm (71.7 in)
- Height: 1,690 mm (66.5 in)
- Curb weight: 1,565–1,685 kg (3,450–3,715 lb)

The third generation of the Zafira, called the Zafira Tourer, was previewed in concept form at the 2011 Geneva Motor Show, as the 'Zafira Tourer Concept'.

It was largely based on the Opel Astra J, and when the Zafira Tourer C went on sale, the Zafira B remained on sale from 2011 up to 2014, albeit in facelifted form as the "Zafira Family", to act as a smaller and cheaper version, as the Zafira Tourer C increased in size, to act as a proper rival to the Ford S-Max.

A hybrid/electric version was expected to follow during 2012. This car indirectly replaced the Opel Sintra, the only previous full sized Vauxhall/Opel MPV in Europe, which was discontinued in May 1999 after just three years on sale, as a slow selling product built in the United States. The production version debuted at the 2011 Frankfurt Motor Show in September, and went on sale November 2011.

A natural gas version of the Zafira Tourer was announced in December 2011. A dual fuel vehicle, its CNG tank driving the car 530 kilometres, and a 14-litre petrol tank provided additional range or operation when a CNG filling station was not available.

In June 2016, a facelift was unveiled for 2017 (with sales starting at the end of 2016), dropping 'Tourer' from the name when sold as an Opel. As part of the upgrade, new front and rear bumpers and new interior brought styling in line with the Opel Astra K. OnStar navigation was also introduced as part of an updated IntelliLink infotainment system, complete with 4G LTE hotspot, Apple CarPlay and Android Auto compatibility.

Other new options for MY2017 included adaptive LED headlights, "Opel Eye" front camera, high beam assist, traffic sign assist, forward collision warning, lane departure warning and adaptive cruise control.

In June 2018, the Vauxhall Zafira Tourer was discontinued from the United Kingdom, citing the rise of SUV and crossover vehicles.

In 2019, it was replaced by LCV-based Zafira Life.

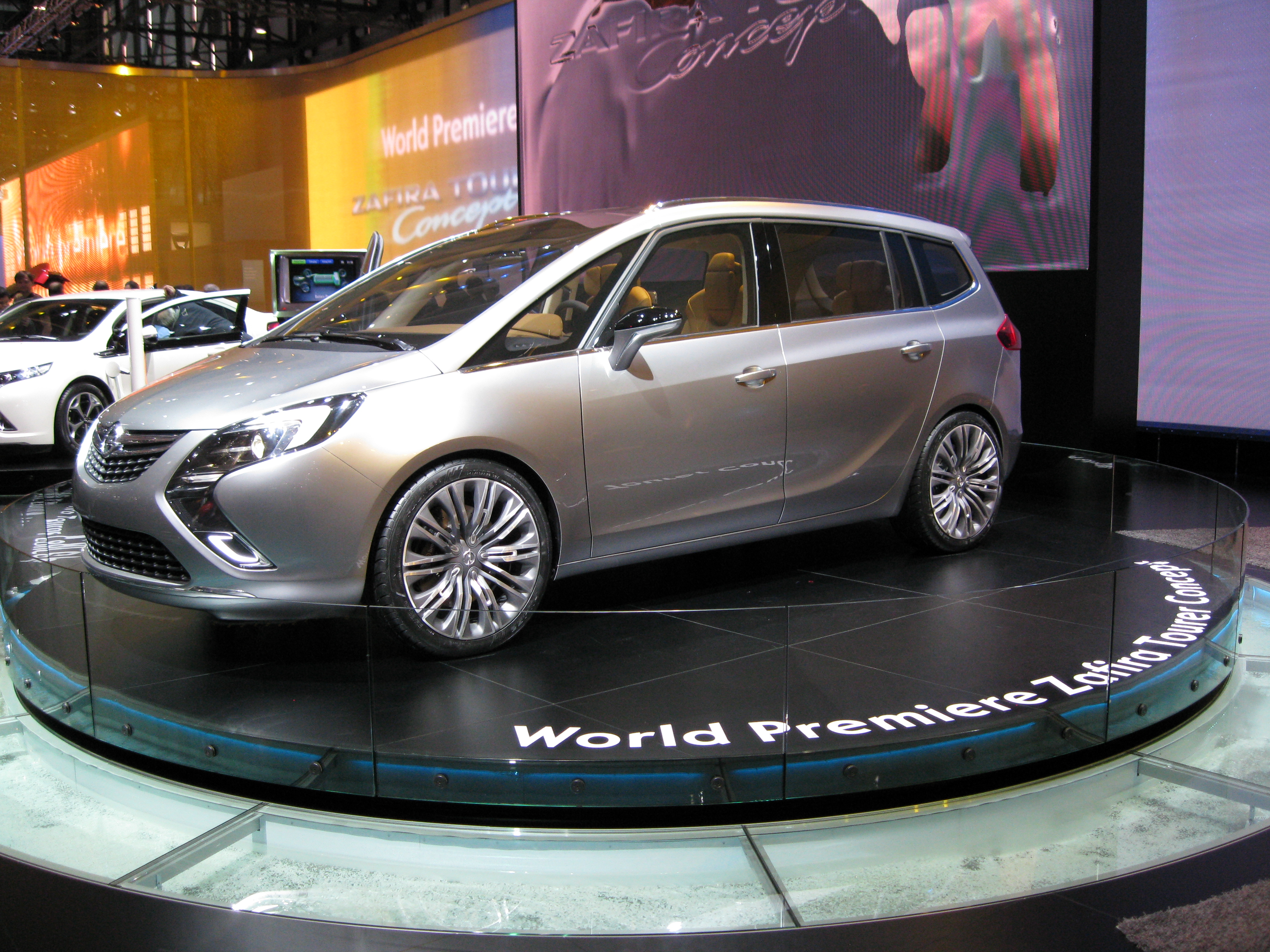
Opel Zafira Tourer Concept

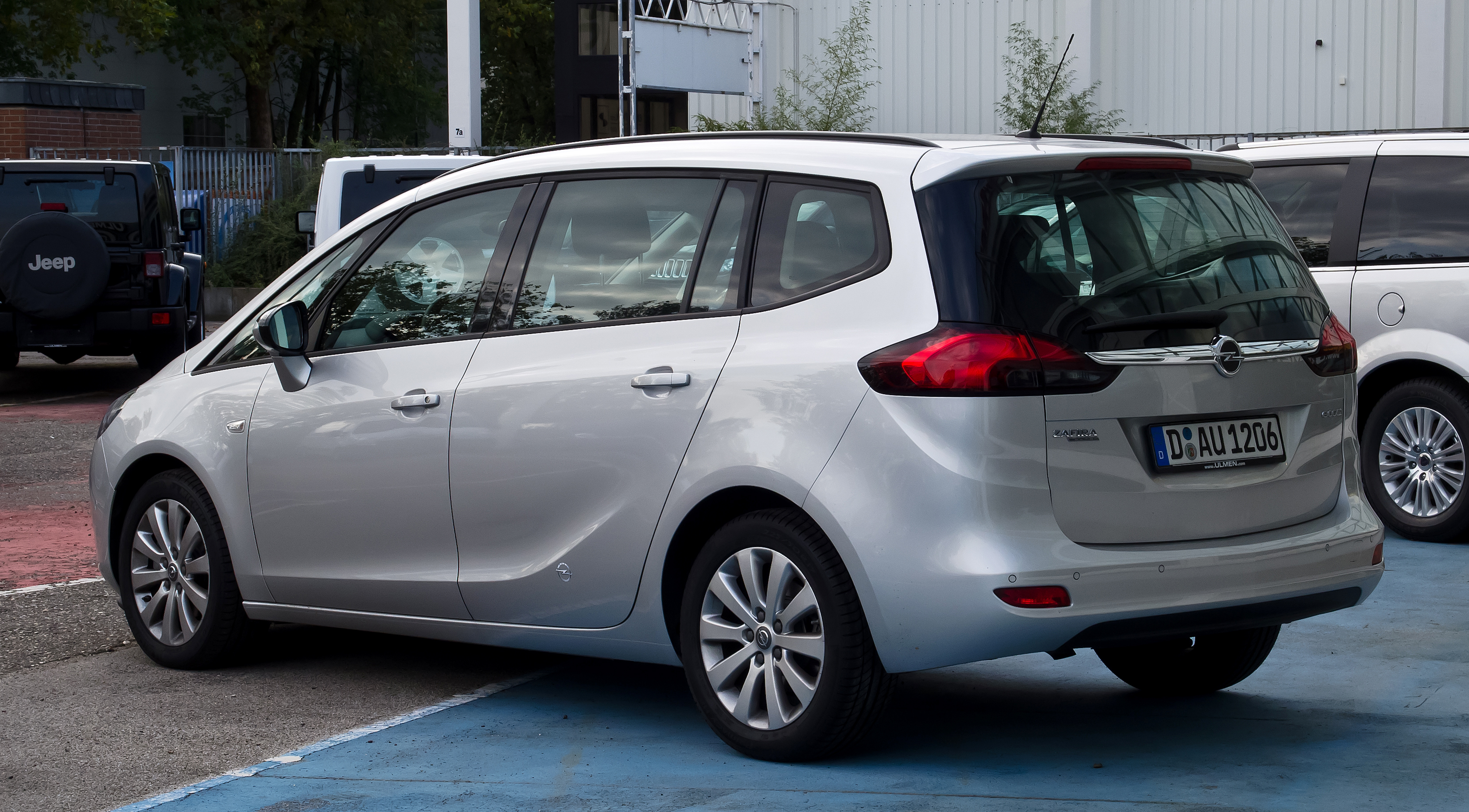
Opel Zafira Tourer 1.4 Turbo

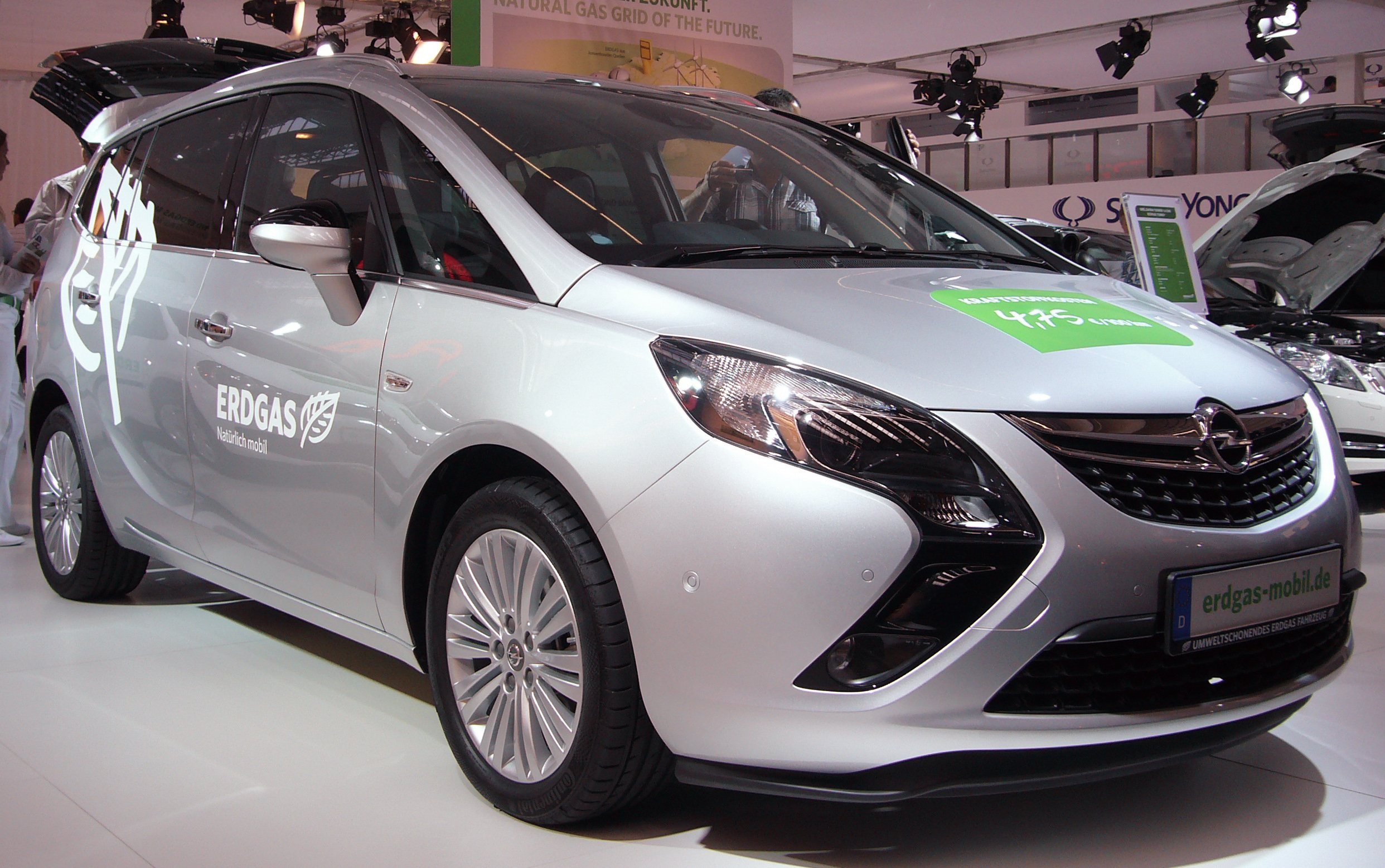
Opel Zafira Tourer C CNG

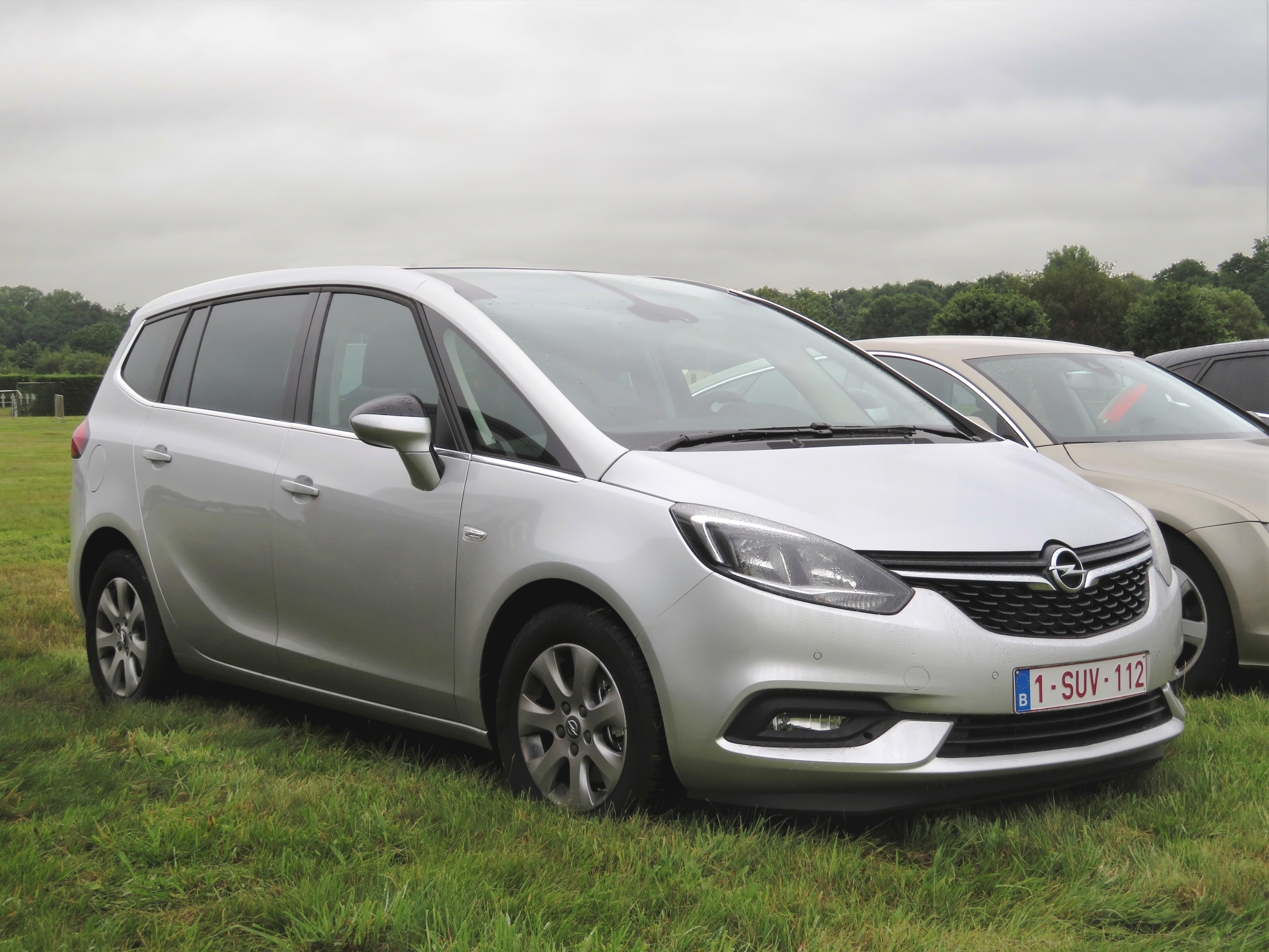
Opel Zafira Tourer (facelift)

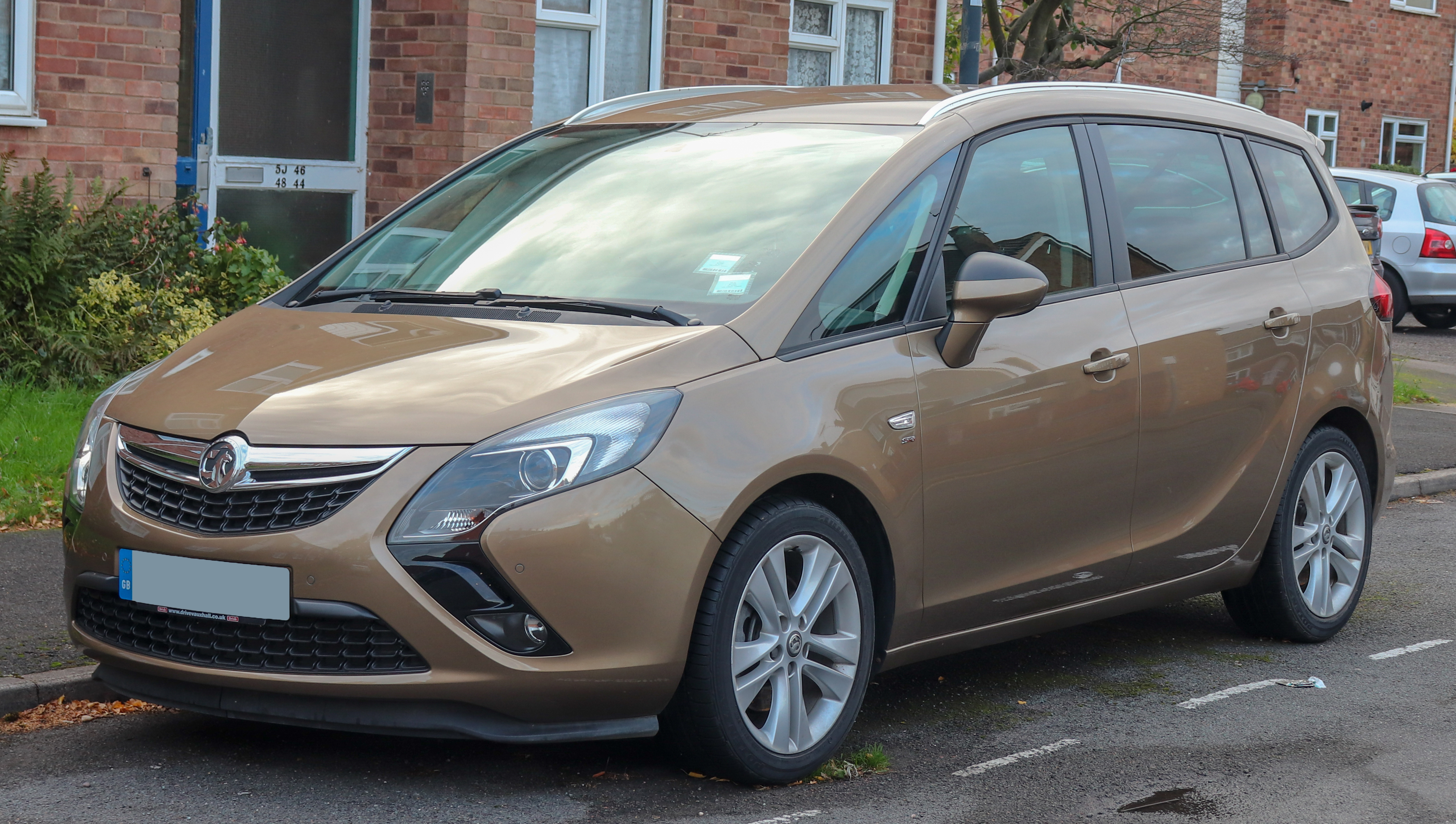
Vauxhall Zafira Tourer

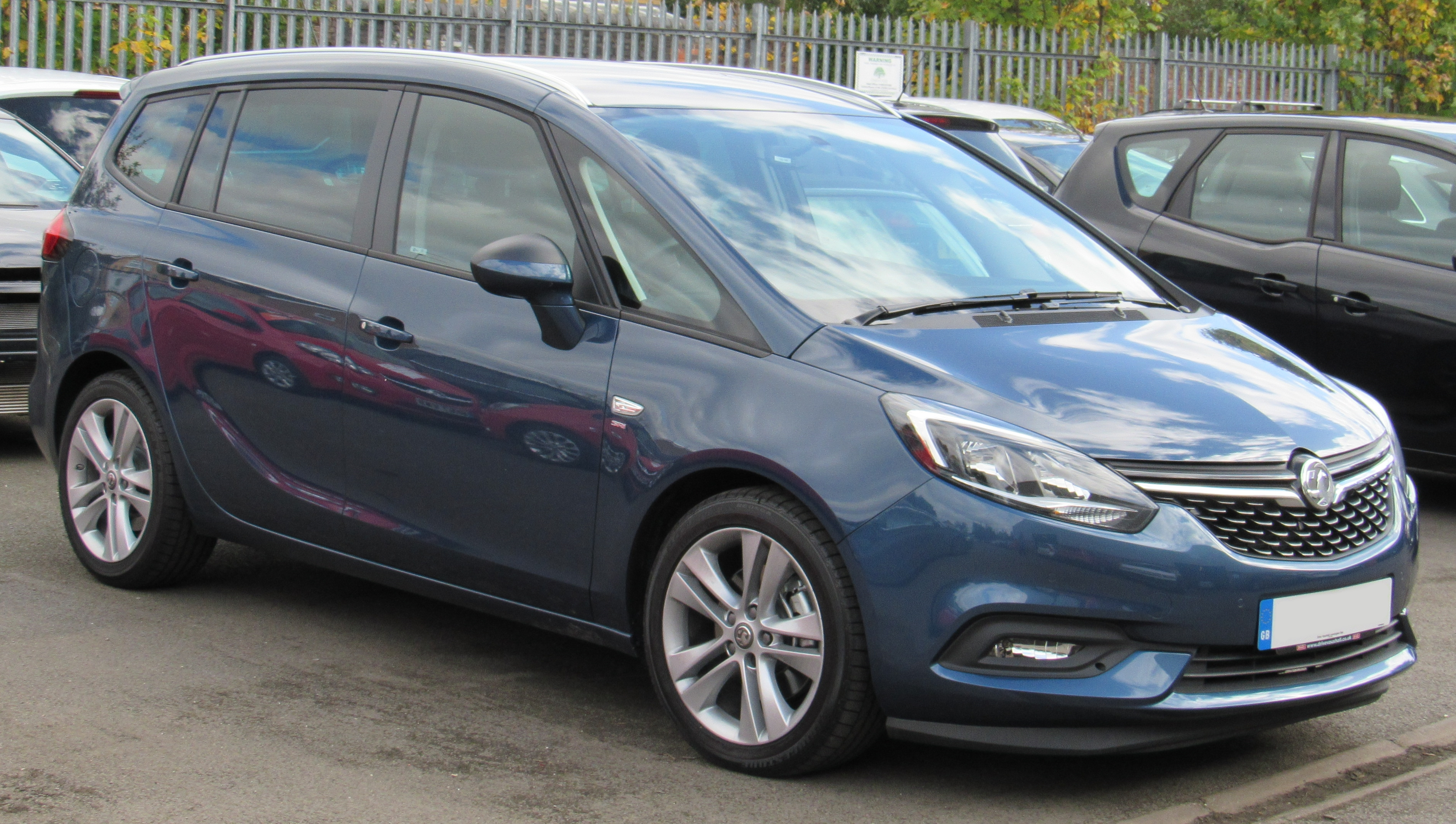
Vauxhall Zafira Tourer (facelift)

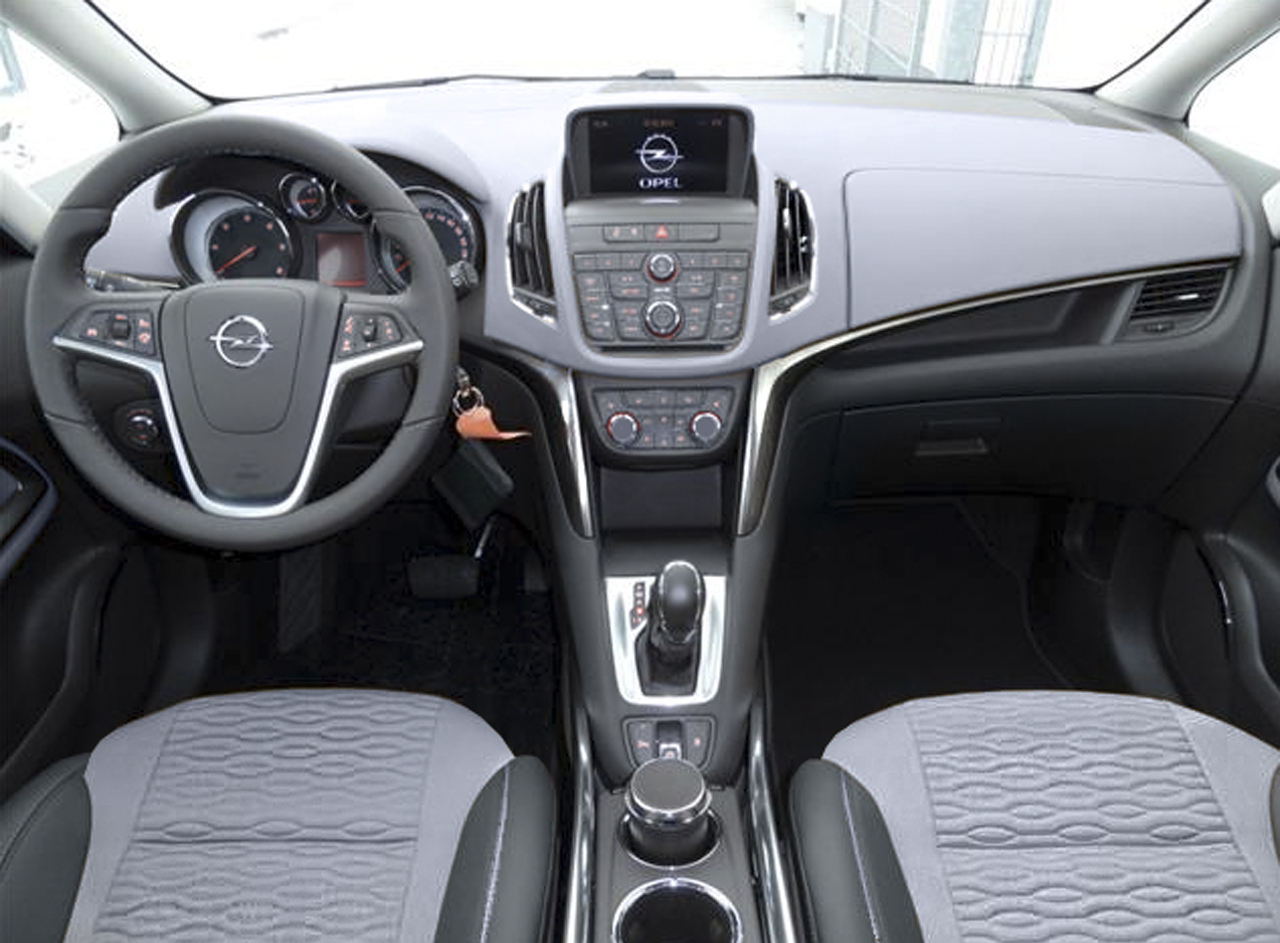
Dashboard

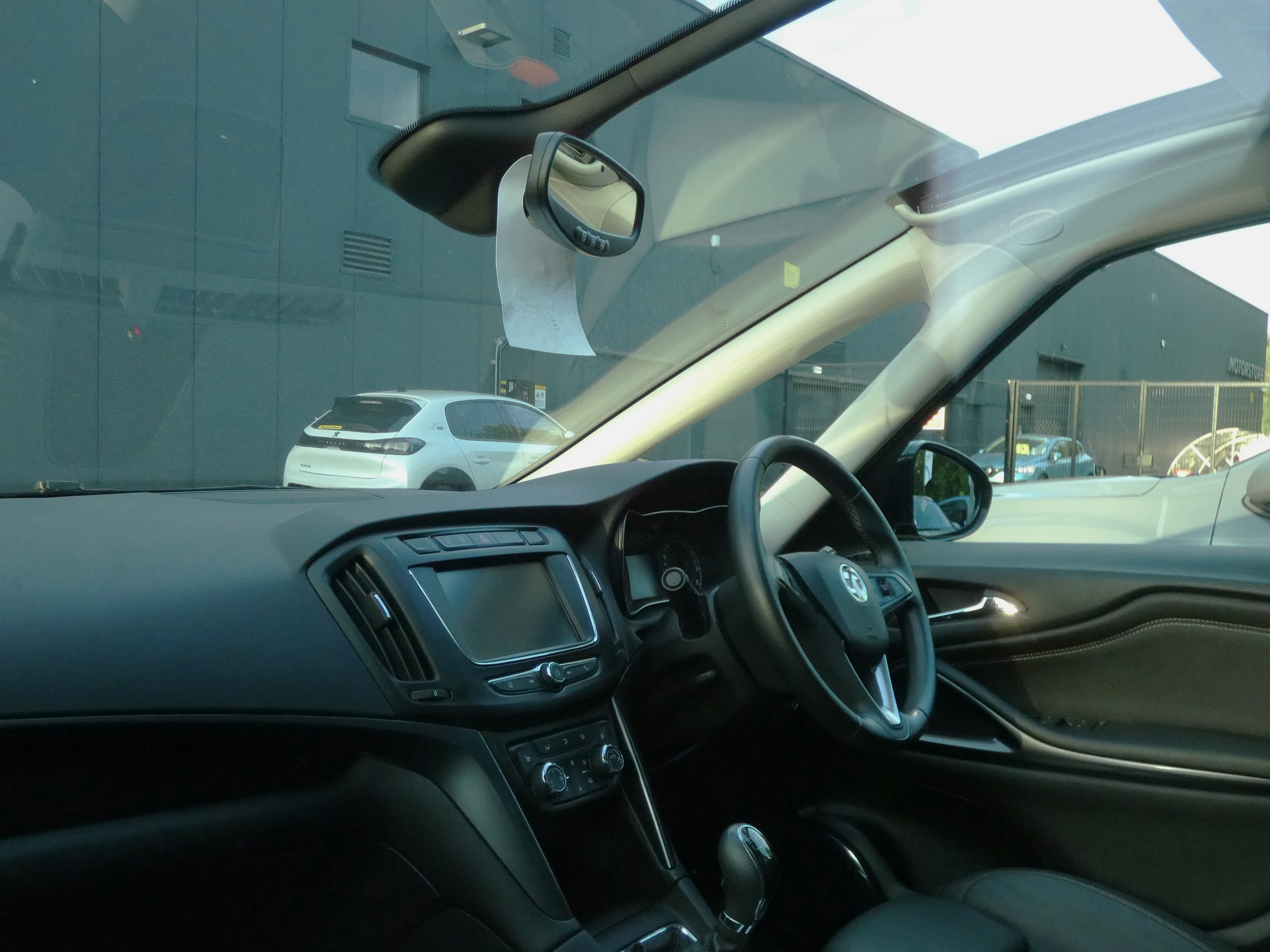
Interior (facelift) - Panoramic Windscreen

=== Engines ===
All engines had a six speed manual gearbox as standard, bar the 1.8 petrol, which had a five speed manual gearbox as standard. An automatic gearbox was available as an option on the 1.4T and 2.0 CDTI (165 PS), both without S/S.

An EcoFLEX version went on sale in 2012, equipped with the 2.0 CDTI (130PS) engine and it gained a Start/Stop system to make it more economical, emitting 119g/km of CO_{2}, as for petrol variants they were 1.4T ecoFLEX with a Start/Stop system with same amount of power (120 and 140 PS) like standard versions but with lower CO_{2} emissions – 144g/km and better fuel efficiency.

In 2013, two all new engines were introduced: 1.6 SIDI Turbo petrol engine with 170 PS and 200 PS, and newly developed 1.6 CDTI diesel engine with 136 PS. In September 2014, Opel introduced its all new generation of engines – Large Diesel engines, starting with 2.0 CDTI engine with 170 PS and 400 Nm, which is a part of new strategy in which Opel will introduce seventeen new engines, in a period from 2014–2018.

Petrol engine
| Model | Engine | Displacement | Power | Torque | Note | CO_{2} emission (g/km) | Year |
|---|---|---|---|---|---|---|---|
| 1.4 Turbo S/S | I4 | 1364 cc | 120 PS (88 kW; 118 hp) at 4,900–6000 rpm | 200 N⋅m (148 lb⋅ft) at 1,850–4,900 rpm | N/A in UK | 154 | |
| 1.4 Turbo S/S | I4 | 1364 cc | 140 PS (103 kW; 138 hp) at 4,900–6000 rpm | 200 N⋅m (148 lb⋅ft) at 1,850–4,900 rpm | | 154 | |
| 1.6 Turbo SIDI | I4 | 1598 cc | 170 PS (125 kW; 168 hp) at 6000 rpm | 260 N⋅m (192 lb⋅ft) at 1650–3200 rpm overboost: 280 N⋅m (207 lb⋅ft)) at 4250 rpm | | 144 | 2013– |
| 1.6 Turbo SIDI | I4 | 1598 cc | 200 PS (147 kW; 197 hp) at 5500 rpm | 280 N⋅m (207 lb⋅ft) at 1650–3500 rpm overboost: 300 N⋅m (221 lb⋅ft)) at 4250 rpm | | 154 | 2014– |
| 1.8 VVT | I4 | 1796 cc | 115 PS (85 kW; 113 hp) at 5,600 rpm | 175 N⋅m (129 lb⋅ft) at 3,800 rpm | | 169 | |
| 1.8 VVT | I4 | 1796 cc | 140 PS (103 kW; 138 hp) at 6,300 rpm | 175 N⋅m (129 lb⋅ft) at 3,800 rpm | | 169 | |
LPG/CNG engine
| Model | Engine | Displacement | Power | Torque | Note | CO_{2} emission (g/km) | Year |
| 1.4 Turbo ecoFLEX | I4 | 1364 cc | 140 PS (103 kW; 138 hp) at 4,900–6000 rpm | 200 N⋅m (148 lb⋅ft) at 1,850–4,900 rpm | LPG | 139 | |
| 1.6 Turbo ecoFLEX | I4 | 1598 cc | 150 PS (110 kW; 148 hp) at 5,000 rpm | 210 N⋅m (155 lb⋅ft) at 2,300–5,000 rpm | CNG | 129 | |
Diesel engine
| Model | Engine | Displacement | Power | Torque | Note | CO_{2} emission (g/km) | Year |
| 1.6 CDTI | I4 | 1598 cc | 120 PS (88 kW; 118 hp) at 4,000 rpm | 320 N⋅m (236 lb⋅ft) at 2,000 rpm | N/A in UK | 119 | 2014–2019 |
| 1.6 CDTI | I4 | 1598 cc | 136 PS (100 kW; 134 hp) at 3,500–4,000 rpm | 320 N⋅m (236 lb⋅ft) at 2,000 rpm | | 109 | 2013–2019 |
| 2.0 CDTI | I4 | 1956 cc | 110 PS (81 kW; 108 hp) at 4,000 rpm | 260 N⋅m (192 lb⋅ft) at 1,750–2,500 rpm | N/A in UK | 137 | 2011–2014 |
| 2.0 CDTI ecoFLEX S/S | I4 | 1956 cc | 130 PS (96 kW; 130 hp) at 4,000 rpm | 300 N⋅m (221 lb⋅ft) at 1,750–2,500 rpm | from 2013 only with AT | 119; 154 with AT | 2012–2019 |
| 2.0 CDTI S/S | I4 | 1956 cc | 165 PS (121 kW; 163 hp) at 4,000 rpm | 350 N⋅m (258 lb⋅ft) at 1,750–2,500 rpm | | 137 | 2012–2014 |
| 2.0 CDTI ecoFLEX S/S | I4 | 1956 cc | 170 PS (125 kW; 168 hp) at 3,750 rpm | 400 N⋅m (295 lb⋅ft) at 1,750–2,500 rpm | | 129 | 2015–2019 |
| 2.0 CDTI Bi-Turbo S/S | I4 | 1956 cc | 195 PS (143 kW; 192 hp) at 4,000 rpm | 400 N⋅m (295 lb⋅ft) at 1,750–2,500 rpm | | 144 | 2012–2019 |

== Awards ==
- The Zafira Tourer was awarded "Best Estate" at the German Car of the Year awards of 2012.
- The Zafira Tourer scored a five star rating in Euro NCAP.
- The Opel Zafira Tourer won the "Golden Steering Wheel 2012" award from German publications Auto Bild, Bild am Sonntag and twenty six European partner magazines.

== Sales ==
=== Chevrolet Zafira ===
| Year | Brazil |
|---|---|
| 2001 | 13,521 |
| 2002 | 11,592 |
| 2003 | 8,804 |
| 2004 | 12,148 |
| 2005 | 9,793 |
| 2006 | 8,253 |
| 2007 | 10,466 |
| 2008 | 10,272 |
| 2009 | 9,363 |
| 2010 | 9,263 |
| 2011 | 7,745 |
| 2012 | 4,667 |
