= Speed (TV series) =

BBC's Television Series

- Presented by: Jeremy Clarkson
- Opening theme: "Dancing Down the Stoney Road" by Chris Rea
- Country of origin: United Kingdom
- Original language: English
- No. of episodes: 6

Production
- Executive producer: Bill Grist
- Running time: 30 minutes
- Production companies: BBC Birmingham and TLC

Original release
- Network: BBC One
- Release: 10 June – 15 July 2001

Speed (original production name: The Science of Speed) is a BBC television series about the history of fast vehicles, including aeroplanes, boats and cars. The show is presented by Jeremy Clarkson and consists of six episodes. Each focuses on a different aspect of speed. The series was first shown in the UK on BBC One in 2001, and was subsequently shown to an international audience on BBC World and in Australia on the HOW TO Channel. Jeremy Clarkson's Speed, a video containing an hour of highlights from the series was also released in 2001. The video was released on DVD, as part of The Jeremy Clarkson Collection in 2007.

== List of episodes ==
No.	Title	Original release date	Prod. code
1	"The Thrill of Speed"	10 June 2001	LSFJ342R
Jeremy visits New Zealand to try out the 'fly by wire' rocket ride near Queenstown and takes his mother on a rollercoaster, rides with the British Army bobsleigh team and visits California to investigate dragboat racing to understand why some people love speed when some others don't. Jeremy then interviews Formula One World Champion Damon Hill in an attempt to find out.
2	"Superstars of Speed"	17 June 2001	LSFJ344E
Jeremy interviews Formula One World Champion Michael Schumacher, World Rally Champion Colin McRae and tennis player Greg Rusedski in an attempt to find out what makes some people better at coping with high speed than the rest of us.
3	"Surviving Speed"	24 June 2001	LSFJ346S
Jeremy attempts to discover how a fragile human body can cope with the power of Speed. He also explores the risks of rapid transit, meets Cresta Run riders in St Moritz and talks to the chief test pilot of the Eurofighter.
4	"Nature Fights Back"	1 July 2001	LSFJ343
Jeremy meets desert racers, speed skiers, test pilots, skydivers and astronauts, in an attempt to find out how nature fights back. He then attempts the Anglo-American race to break the sound barrier and experiences oxygen deprivation in pressurisation unit.
5	"Superhuman Speed"	8 July 2001	LSFJ345Y
Jeremy takes his first love, the internal combustion engine, to a new personal record of 215mph on the salt flats of Utah. He then climbs aboard the fastest ever jet-powered plane, straps a jet engine to a push bike and gets up close to a space shuttle engine at full power.
6	"The Century of Speed"	15 July 2001	LSFJ347L
Looking to the future, Jeremy comes to the surprising conclusion that speed was a 20th century phenomenon and everything is slowing down. He also discovers that 20th century speed machines are becoming toys, which he promptly proves by getting behind the controls of a fighter plane in a dogfight with a German. Plus Jeremy reveals his ultimate favourite speed machine.
