= Jeremy Clarkson: Meets the Neighbours =

- Genre: Motoring documentary
- Directed by: Dennis Jarvis
- Presented by: Jeremy Clarkson
- Country of origin: United Kingdom
- No. of episodes: 5

Production
- Executive producer: Elaine Bedell
- Producer: Andy Wilman
- Running time: 40 minutes
- Production company: Chrysalis Entertainment

Original release
- Network: BBC Two
- Release: 24 May – 21 June 2002

Jeremy Clarkson: Meets the Neighbours is a British television series presented by Jeremy Clarkson. During the course of the series, he drives a 1960s Jaguar E-Type around six European countries.

== Format ==
The show was first shown during 24 May 2002 to 21 June 2002 on BBC Two. Over the series, Clarkson drove around 20,000 miles visiting six European countries to discover just how different their lifestyles are to those in Britain, and whether the reality matches the stereotypical perception of each country. The show was produced by Chrysalis Entertainment for the BBC and executively produced by Elaine Bedell. Meets The Neighbours was the second of two series involving Clarkson which were filmed during his hiatus from Top Gear, and his fifth documentary series for the BBC, following Motorworld, Extreme Machines, Car Years and Speed. The show was first shown on UK television channel BBC Two, before being shown to an international audience on BBC World. As of 2008, it has regularly been repeated on various UKTV channels, most recently being Dave. 30-minute versions of each episode have also been aired.

=== Notable guests ===
During episode 3, Clarkson was taken around the Nürburgring by Sabine Schmitz, who would appear as a guest several times on the revamped series. In 2015, after Clarkson's suspension, The Guardian ran an article ironically suggesting that she be hired as his replacement on Top Gear; she joined the show in 2016.

== Episode list ==
#	Episode	Airdate	Production code	UK viewers (million)
1	France	24 May 2002	ICFB890S	2.43
2	Belgium & Netherlands	31 May 2002	ICFB891L	2.01
3	Germany	7 June 2002	ICFB892F	2.12
4	Spain	14 June 2002	ICFB893A	2.39
5	Italy	21 June 2002	ICFB894T	2.98
