= Clarkson (TV series) =

British television chat show

- Genre: Chat show
- Directed by: Brian Klein
- Presented by: Jeremy Clarkson
- Country of origin: United Kingdom
- Original language: English
- No. of series: 3
- No. of episodes: 29

Production
- Producers: Elaine Bedell; Ben Devlin
- Running time: 40 minutes (1998-99); 30 minutes (2000)
- Production company: Watchmaker Television

Original release
- Network: BBC Two
- Release: 8 November 1998 – 27 December 2000

Clarkson is a British chat show presented by Jeremy Clarkson and aired from 8 November 1998 to 27 December 2000 on BBC Two. The show featured guest interviews with musicians, politicians and television personalities.

== Format ==
The show consisted of Clarkson talking about modern life and interviewing celebrity guests, often with a differing opinion from his own.

Usually there was an interview at the beginning and the end of the show. The time between the main interviews was filled with repeating segments with often at least one more guest.

=== Segments ===
==== Focus country ====
In series 1 and 2, Clarkson focussed on a country, mocked their culture and particularly their culinary tradition, then interview a celebrity representative from this country.

In series 1, this was always one of the members of the European Union. In series 2, the scope broadened to all countries. This segment was dropped in series 3 to fit the shorter format.

==== Kitchen antics ====
In addition to mocking the food of EU countries, in series 2 & 3, this expanded to inventive and dangerous ways to cook food and use kitchen implements. This included exploding vegetables on barbecues, putting unsuitable items in microwaves and attempting to slice a pizza with an oxyacetylene welding torch.

==== Fantasy dictators league ====
Each episode in series 1, Clarkson updated a chart of the 8 dictators who ruled countries at the time. Their performance was tracked and updated every week, with the winner awarded a trophy: the "Pol Pot".

The original list were:

- North Korea: Kim Jong-il
- Iraq: Saddam Hussein
- Nigeria: Abdulsalami Abubakar
- Cuba: Fidel Castro
- Libya: Colonel Muammar Gadaffi
- Somalia: Hussein Farrah Aidid
- Afghanistan: Ameer-ul-Mu'mineen Mulla Muhammad Umar
- China: Jiang Zemin

Abdulsalami Abubakar was removed from the list mid-series, after he set a date for elections and a return to democracy. He was replaced by British politician Peter Mandelson.

In the final episode, false subtitles were used to generate reactions to the league and insult Clarkson.

==== Public service broadcasts ====
Starting in series 2, he broadcast short parodies of public service broadcasts.

== Episodes ==
=== Series 1 (1998) ===
No. overall	No. in series	Guests	EU country & guest	Original release date
1	1	Laurie Pike; Muriel Gray	Italy; Franco Ferrarotti	8 November 1998
2	2	Ian Botham; Clive James	Greece; Stelios Haji-Ioannou (Note: Stelios Haji-Ioannou is actually from Cyprus, which at the time was not in the EU.)	15 November 1998
3	3	William Hunt; Ron Atkinson; Richard Littlejohn	Holland; Raoul Heertje	22 November 1998
4	4	Anne Robinson; Keith Floyd	Scotland; Kaye Adams	29 November 1998
5	5	Anthea Turner; P. J. O'Rourke	France; Helene Veret	6 December 1998
6	6	Jeff Green; Alan Clark	Sweden; Babben Larsson	13 December 1998 (Note: The billing listed Alan Titchmarsh and Charlie Dimmock as guests, but they did not appear on the programme.)
7	7	A. A. Gill; Steve Curtis; Bruce Dickinson	Germany; Oliver Schmitt (de)	20 December 1998

=== Series 2 (1999) ===
No. overall	No. in series	Guests	EU country & guest	Original release date
8	1	Tara Palmer-Tomkinson; Jonathan Ross	Iceland; Magnus Magnusson	3 October 1999
9	2	Gordon Ramsay; Will Carling	Canada; Mike Wilmot	10 October 1999
10	3	Jayne Middlemiss; Germaine Greer	Russia; Vitali Vitaliev (Note: Vitali Vitaliev is actually from the Ukraine.)	17 October 1999
11	4	Michael Winner; George Lazenby	Australia; Kathy Lette	24 October 1999
12	5	Marcus Allen; Sankha Guha	Wales; Rob Brydon	31 October 1999 (Note: Jim Davidson was listed to be a guest on this episode but was never asked to be on the show)
13	6	Melinda Messenger (Note: The billing erroneously listed Melinda Messenger as a guest for the following week.); Monty Don; Terry Wogan	Spain; Guillermo Fesser	7 November 1999
14	7	Boris Johnson; Steve Bee; Maureen Lipman	Switzerland; Peter Uebersax (de)	14 November 1999
15	8	Piers Morgan; Brian Sewell; Griff Rhys Jones	India; Gulshan Grover	21 November 1999
16	9	Carol Smillie; Vinnie Jones	Belgium; Plastic Bertrand	5 December 1999
17	10	Max Clifford; Mo Mowlam; Eddie Irvine	TBA	12 December 1999
18	11	The Best of Clarkson	TBA	29 December 1999

=== Series 3 (2000) ===
No. overall	No. in series	Guests	Original release date
19	1	Jonathon Porritt; Martin Clunes	19 October 2000
20	2	William Hague; Jenson Button	26 October 2000
21	3	Ben Elton; Jane Moore	2 November 2000
22	4	Ken Follett; Damon Hill	9 November 2000
23	5	Rory Bremner; Lesley Garrett	16 November 2000
24	6	Tony Banks; Status Quo	23 November 2000
25	7	Charles Kennedy; Jamie Oliver	30 November 2000
26	8	Rich Hall	7 December 2000
27	9	Jamie Blandford	14 December 2000
28	10	John Humphrys; Murray Walker (Note: Previous guest Damon Hill also featured to present an award to Murray Walker, he was not interviewed in this programme.)	21 December 2000
29	11	Best of Clarkson 2000	27 December 2000
