= The Grand Tour (2026) =

British motoring television series

- Genre: Motoring; Entertainment
- Created by: Jeremy Clarkson; Richard Hammond; James May; Andy Wilman
- Written by: Sam Philip
- Directed by: Phil Churchward; James Bryce
- Presented by: James Engelsman; Thomas Holland; Francis Bourgeois
- Country of origin: United Kingdom
- Original language: English
- No. of seasons: 1
- No. of episodes: 6

Production
- Executive producers: Tim Harcourt; Stephen Lambert; Alex Renton; Nia Yemoh; Phil Churchward
- Producer: Zac Assemakis
- Editors: Dan James; Stevey Jones; Ian Grech BFE; James Hart
- Camera setup: Multi-camera
- Running time: 47-57 minutes
- Production company: Studio Lambert

Original release
- Network: Amazon Prime Video
- Release: 4 September 2026 – present

Related
- The Grand Tour

The Grand Tour

YouTube information
- Channel: The Grand Tour
- Subscribers: 2.71 million
- Views: 1.35 billion
- Last updated: 10 September 2026

The Grand Tour is a British motoring television series, created by Jeremy Clarkson, Richard Hammond, James May and Andy Wilman, for Amazon Prime Video. The programme is a reboot of the original which aired from 2016 to 2024. The new show features James Engelsman, Thomas Holland and Francis Bourgeois, announced by Amazon in July 2026 with all six episodes of the first series available on 4 September. The show follows a similar format to the final three series of the original show with roadtrip specials.

== History ==
In May 2025, The Sun newspaper reported that YouTubers James Engelsman and Thomas Holland and social media personality Francis Bourgeois were the show's new presenting line-up. The new line-up was officially confirmed on 5 February 2026 in a video by Clarkson. Amazon formally announced the reboot on 14 July with the six-episode series released on 4 September, listed as its own show on Prime Video. The series follows a similar format to the past three series with the new presenters marking the start of a new era for The Grand Tour.

== Episodes ==
No. overall	No. in series	Title	Main feature(s)	Vehicles reviewed	Original release date
1	1	"The Next Generation"	High horsepower petrol powered American supercars across the Mojave Desert: (Ford Mustang GTD, Chevrolet Corvette ZR1, Hennessey Venom F5 Revolution Evo)	N/A	4 September 2026
Francis, Thomas, and James receive an official blessing from Jeremy Clarkson at Diddly-Squat Farm, before going off on their first adventure together. In a road trip across southern California, the trio compare three of the greatest petrol-powered vehicles made in North America. Engelsman selects the Ford Mustang GTD, Holland chooses the Chevrolet Corvette ZR1, and Francis is blown away by the Hennessey Venom F5 Revolution Evo.
2	2	"Sweat, Sports Cars and Singapore"	Sports cars for under £5,000 in Malaysia: (Jaguar XKR, Nissan 350Z, Mercedes CLK 55 AMG)	N/A	4 September 2026
Starting in Singapore, the trio travel north to Malaysia to experience the country's car culture, and take part in a series of automotive challenges using sports cars they have purchased on a £5,000 budget. Thomas acquires a modified Jaguar XKR, Engelsman purchases a Nissan 350Z, whilst Bourgeois uses a Black-Series body-kitted Mercedes CLK 55 AMG.
3	3	"It's OK to be Kei"	Proving the worthiness of kei-cars in Colorado: (Honda Acty Attack, Suzuki Alto, Autozam AZ-1)	N/A	4 September 2026
Following a chat with May at the Royal Oak pub about the size of modern cars, the trio head to the United States to prove the worthiness of kei-cars. Engelsman uses the Autozam AZ-1, Bourgeois uses the Suzuki Alto whilst Thomas uses the Honda Acty Attack. Starting in Wyoming (where kei-cars are legal to drive), they drive through Colorado (where kei-cars are illegal to drive), culminating in a sprint up Pikes Peak.
4	4	"Last Car Standing"	Discovering the strongest production car ever made: (Lexus LS400, Volvo 240 Estate, Ford Crown Victoria Police Interceptor)	Totem GT Super • Prodrive P25	4 September 2026
In Italy, Thomas and Bourgeois compare two of the latest restomods. Thomas drives the Totem GT Super (based on the Alfa Romeo GTA), while Bourgeois showcases the Prodrive P25 (based on the Subaru Impreza P1). Later, after watching the experiment on the Toyota Hilux in series 3 of Top Gear, the trio attempt to find out which is the toughest production car ever made, Bourgeois champions the Lexus LS400, Thomas selects a Volvo 240 Estate, and Engelsman backs the Ford Crown Victoria Police Interceptor. After a series of thorough tests, they seek help from Richard Hammond at his workshop, The Smallest Cog.
5	5	"A Relaxing Spa Weekend"	Epic race from Williams F1 HQ to Spa: Pagani Utopia Roadster vs. public transport • Tribute to the Isetta	Pagani Utopia Roadster • Microlino	4 September 2026
The trio race from the Altassian Williams F1 Team headquarters in Grove, Oxfordshire, to the Spa circuit in Belgium to deliver a racing helmet to driver Alex Albon before sprint qualifying begins. While Engelsman and Bourgeois cycle and take a series of trains to the circuit, Thomas drives the Pagani Utopia Roadster, which he later reviews at an airfield. Later in Berlin, Engelsman pays tribute to the Isetta and reviews its modern alternative with Thomas, the Microlino.
6	6	"Angola: Survive to Drive"	Race-bred cars for under £10,000 in Angola: (Porsche 911, BMW M3 Convertible, Nissan Pulsar GTI-R)	N/A	4 September 2026
The presenters conclude their first series together, by heading to Angola with a range of cars bought and modified for no more than £10,000. Engelsman purchases a Porsche 911, Thomas buys a BMW M3 Convertible and Bourgeois acquires a Nissan Pulsar GTI-R. Starting off the coast, they travel to Moçâmedes, and then to Lubango to take part in their first ever race.

== Reception ==
The new version of the show received mostly positive reviews from critics. On the review aggregation website Rotten Tomatoes, the first series of The Grand Tour has a "fresh" rating of 88%, based on 8 reviews.
