= Victoria Cross (disambiguation) =

The Victoria Cross is the highest award for gallantry awarded to members of the British and Commonwealth armed forces.

Victoria Cross may also refer to:

== Awards ==
- Victoria Cross for Australia
- Victoria Cross (Canada)
- Victoria Cross for New Zealand

== Film ==
- The Victoria Cross (film), a 1916 American silent film by Edward LeSaint
- The Victoria Cross: For Valour, a 2003 BBC television historical documentary
- The Victoria Cross (1912 film), an American film biography of Florence Nightingale
- The Victoria Cross (1914 film), a British silent film by Harold M. Shaw

== Places ==
- Victoria Cross railway station, a railway station in North Sydney, Australia
- Victoria Cross Ranges, a mountain range in Alberta, Canada
- Victoria Cross, Prince Edward Island, a community in Three Rivers, Prince Edward Island, Canada
- Victoria Cross, Cork, a neighbourhood adjacent to Wilton, Cork, Ireland

== People ==
- Victoria Cross, pseudonym of Annie Sophie Cory (1868–1952), British novelist
