= Nigel Paterson =

Nigel Paterson may refer to:

- Nigel Paterson (producer)
- Nigel Paterson (musician)
