= The World According to Clarkson =

Book collection by Jeremy Clarkson

The World According To Clarkson
- Author: Jeremy Clarkson
- Language: English
- Genre: Factual; Comedy; Satire
- Publisher: Penguin
- Publication date: UK 2004; Poland 2006; Netherlands 2007; Lithuania 2011; Ukraine 2015
- Publication place: United Kingdom
- Media type: Paperback
- Pages: 352
- ISBN: 0-14-101789-9

The World According To Clarkson is a book collection of Jeremy Clarkson's columns, written while working for The Sunday Times. They ran from 7 January 2001 until 29 December 2019. There are eight volumes of The World According To Clarkson. The topics were varied, each one usually based on either a big or trivial news story from the week. The book is a number one Sunday Times million copies bestseller.

The book was included in The Sunday Times 100 bestselling books of the last 50 years in August 2024.

Clarkson discussed a wide variety of topics, usually taking a cynical approach.

All of the articles are written with a humorous approach but often with some serious undertone.

The book was translated into Ukrainian and Polish.

In Poland it appeared under the title Świat według Clarksona (Insignis, 2006), becoming the number one bestseller in the country. Another volume of his Sunday Times articles was published in 2009 as Driven to Distraction.

In Ukraine it appeared under the title Джеремі Кларксон та світ довкола.
