= Geraldine Bedell =

British novelist and writer

Geraldine Bedell is a British novelist and writer for The Observer.

She drew wide public attention when she claimed she had been disinvited from a planned appearance at the first International Festival of Literature in Dubai, because her novel The Gulf Between Us featured a homosexual sheikh. Writer Margaret Atwood cancelled her scheduled appearance but later retracted when she found out that Bedell had never been invited to the Festival nor had her book been banned. Atwood subsequently made two virtual appearances at the Festival and appeared in person at the 2011 Festival.

== Family ==
She is married to Charles Leadbeater and is the sister of Elaine Bedell, CEO of the Southbank Centre.

Bedell's first marriage was to banker Jonathan Norton, with whom she has two children. After their divorce, Norton married Mo Mowlam in 2005. Norton died on 3 February 2009.

== Books ==
- The Handmade House (Penguin, 2005)
- The Gulf Between Us (Penguin, 2009)
- Party Tricks (Hodder & Stoughton, 1996)
- A Fabulous Fling (HarperCollins, 2000)
