= Jeremy Clarkson on Ferrari =

2000 book by Jeremy Clarkson

- Author: Jeremy Clarkson
- Language: English
- Genre: Nonfiction automotive
- Publisher: Lancaster Publishing Ltd
- Publication date: 1 March 2000
- Publication place: United Kingdom
- Media type: Hardback
- Pages: 218
- ISBN: 1-902989-04-X
- OCLC: 43339632

Jeremy Clarkson on Ferrari is a nonfiction book, published in 2000, written by British journalist and television presenter Jeremy Clarkson. The book covered every model made by Ferrari up to the Ferrari 360 Modena accompanied by colour photographs.

== Background ==
According to an article in The Independent, Clarkson said that in 1999, an old friend of his, Pete Butters, stopped by to re-live old times and have a drink of whisky. Butters suggested that Clarkson should write a book about Ferrari for his new publishing company, who specialise in limited edition books. Clarkson agreed to write the book. Keith Bluemel, a writer with a background of published books about historic Ferraris, was credited as the technical editor.

== Print editions ==
1500 copies of the book were printed and each was individually numbered. 550 copies were leather-bound with an embossed silver plaque. The remainder were cloth-bound, costing £245 each.

== Reception ==
The book was widely criticised in the media. Clarkson branded it a "ridiculous tome".

Thoroughbred and Classic Car magazine criticised the book for having the tone of vanity publishing, relying too much on car show snapshots of questionable quality. The book was also criticised for placing too much emphasis on mainstream models and being too similar to other Ferrari books that cost considerably less.

Andrew Frankel of Motor Sport magazine in describing the book as "the better candidates for the most disappointing book I have ever reviewed"; criticised the content of the book as "doesn't read like Clarkson at all" and "bewilderingly lacking in his trademark style and humour" whilst praising the book's bind quality and "comprehensive history of almost all Ferrari's road cars". To summarise it, they described the book as "at best, an overpriced and entirely missed opportunity. At worst, it is a cynical exploitation of two famous names that fails to come within a light year of doing justice to either." They criticised many of the photographs in the book as "seem to be little more than snaps; some, staggeringly, are not even truly in focus while others appear to be poor quality duplicates blown up far beyond their modest capabilities" in addition as too many of them as "just plain boring".

Clarkson, after reading a copy himself and reading the reviews, stated that the "reviews have been bad but they don't go far enough". In an issue of Top Gear Magazine he said it was the worst thing he had ever done. He added, excepting Captain Corelli's Mandolin and A. A. Gill's Sap Rising, he "considered it to be the worst book in the world" and suggested that "anyone thinking about buying it should flush the money down the loo instead". Clarkson received no payment for the book.

The combined high price and dubious quality of the book, resulted in slow sales compared to other high-end automotive books. As of 2009, second-hand copies command £150.
