= Bedder 6 =

Private media company in Britain

Bedder 6 Limited.
- Company type: Private
- Industry: Media
- Founded: 30 October 2006; 19 years ago London, United Kingdom
- Founders: Jeremy Clarkson; Andy Wilman
- Defunct: 12 September 2017
- Headquarters: London, United Kingdom
- Net income: £1,800,000 (2008)

Bedder 6 was a British company, responsible for exploiting and promoting the Top Gear brand, including international sales. It was founded by presenter Jeremy Clarkson and executive producer Andy Wilman in October 2006. In November 2007, BBC Worldwide purchased 5001 shares giving them a stake of just over 50% of the business. They are believed to have paid £100 for the shares, but also transferred merchandising and some foreign sales rights to the company. The remaining 5000 shares were split 60/40 between Clarkson and Wilman respectively.

The company posted a £1.8m post-tax profit in September 2008, giving its shareholders £700,000 in dividends. By 2013 Bedder 6 had revenues of £149m, and paid out dividends of £16.2m divided between Clarkson (30%, £4.86m), Wilman (20%) and BBC Worldwide (50% £7.5m).

Bedder 6 owned 50% of Sub-Zero Events Limited, a joint-venture set up by BBC Worldwide and Brand Events in February 2008 to run the Top Gear Live shows. Both Bedder 6 and Sub-Zero Events' registered addresses were at BBC White City, the building where Top Gear's offices were located. Sub-Zero Events Limited is now owned by BBC Studios Distribution Limited and Brand Events.

The name of the company refers to a dormitory where both Clarkson and Wilman slept at Repton School, where dormitories are called "bedders".

In 2012 BBC Worldwide took on the whole of the rights to the Top Gear brand to ensure that the BBC received all income from the show and its spinoffs. In July 2015 Clarkson and Wilman, along with Richard Hammond and James May, founded production company W. Chump & Sons. The company is currently working on The Grand Tour, a motoring show for Amazon Video, which debuted on 18 November 2016 in the UK, US, Germany and Japan; then subsequently rolled out worldwide in December 2016.
