= Francis Bourgeois =

English trainspotter and TikToker (born 2000)

- Bourgeois at the BAFTA Television Awards 2026
- Born: Luke Magnus Nicolson; 9 July 2000 (age 26); Harlesden, London, England
- Education: University of Nottingham
- Years active: 2020–present
- Known for: Videos about trainspotting; scootering; modelling

TikTok information
- Page: Francis Bourgeois
- Followers: 3.5 million

YouTube information
- Channel: Francis Bourgeois
- Subscribers: 333,000
- Views: 28.2 million
- Last updated: 30 August 2026

Luke Magnus Nicolson (born 9 July 2000), known as Francis Bourgeois, is an English trainspotter and social media personality. He is most known for his videos on the topic of trains, posted to TikTok and Instagram. As of April 2026, he has over 3.3 million TikTok followers and 2.3 million Instagram followers. In 2026, Bourgeois became host of the Amazon Prime Video motoring entertainment show The Grand Tour.

Bourgeois is often characterised as recording himself through the fisheye lens of a GoPro mounted in front of his face or by juxtaposing trainspotting with contemporary fashion. He is also known for his penchant for scootering, which he frequently incorporates into his videos and other public appearances.

After several of his videos went viral, Bourgeois began collaborating with celebrities such as Joe Jonas and brands including Gucci and The North Face. He has authored one book, The Trainspotter's Notebook, and hosts the digital series Trainspotting with Francis Bourgeois for Channel 4.

== Early life ==
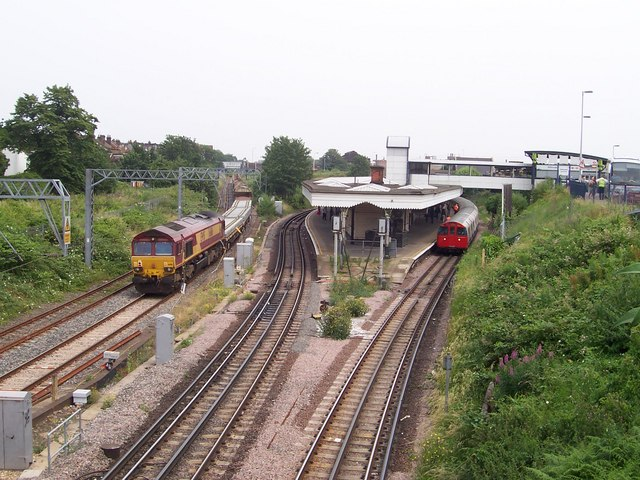
Bourgeois often credits Willesden Junction station and the Bakerloo line for sparking his interest in trains

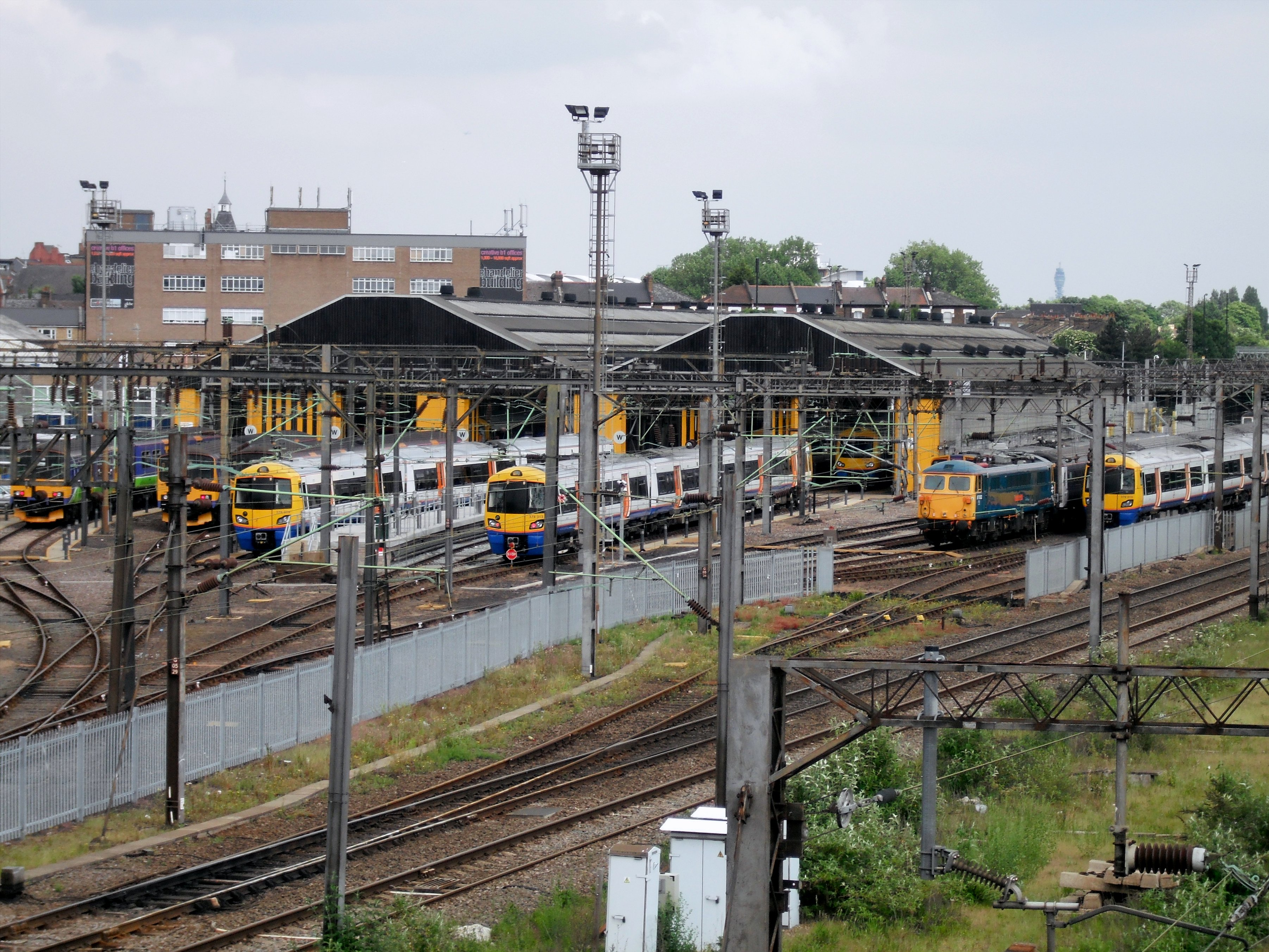
Willesden depot viewed from the westbound North London line platform at Willesden Junction railway station

Luke Magnus Nicolson was born on 9 July 2000, and grew up in Harlesden, north-west London. His mother works for the National Health Service and his father is a photography teacher. He has a brother. Though Bourgeois's family did not have an interest in trains or engineering, they became aware of his interest in trains when he was aged three. He was "obsessed" with BRIO wooden toy train sets, the "stage before you go to Hornby trains", and Hot Wheels toys.

At the age of 4, Bourgeois visited the Peco factory at Pecorama in Devon, after which his grandmother gave him his first model railway set, a "Pannier tank and some old freight wagons". His set received additions at subsequent Christmases and birthdays. Around the age of 6, Bourgeois and his family moved to Frome in Somerset. Despite being away from London's vast rail network, the nearby Whatley Quarry continued to pique his interest in freight trains.

I started a new school in Year Seven, when my favourite thing to do after school was come home and play with my model railway, but I realised I was experiencing feelings of loneliness, so I decided to try and fit in a bit more at school. I gelled my hair up and decided to sell my model railway in order to fund my gym membership. I even wore roadman clothes, but it wasn't me and it wasn't making me happy at all. Lockdown happened, my hair grew out, and I reclaimed my love for trains through my videos.

— Francis Bourgeois addresses accusations of being inauthentic after photographs from his adolescence emerge. (December 2021)

Bourgeois was mocked by school peers for his hobby, and in secondary school, he suppressed his interest in trains to fit in. He explained: "Being a train enthusiast at secondary school is difficult. Gym memberships and trendy clothes took precedence at that point, regrettably."

Bourgeois rekindled his trainspotting pastime during the period of COVID-19 restrictions (2020-2022), frequenting the Pot Lane overbridge in Berkley on the edge of Frome. He considers it his favourite location alongside Willesden Junction.

In 2020, Bourgeois and his brother began shooting videos and posting them to TikTok.

Bourgeois studied mechanical engineering at the University of Nottingham, expressing a desire to pursue industrial engineering and "create new railways or revitalize older lines" as a civil engineer.

Bourgeois was hired by Rolls-Royce in early 2021 but did not complete his one-year contract there working at a car factory in Chichester, instead resigning in November 2021 following his social media growth. His parents supported this decision on the condition that he take the module to convert his bachelor's degree to a master's.

== Name ==
In the first year of his social media presence, it was widely believed that Bourgeois had borrowed his moniker from the 18th-century court painter of the same name. It was later revealed that the name "Francis" was chosen because he "likes France and the way they do trains", and "Bourgeois" was inspired by a visit with his father to a sculpture exhibition by Louise Bourgeois. Given the perception amongst his school peers that trainspotting was uncool, he explained that his pseudonym allowed him to "feel a bit more protected" when making videos. When he was applying for his fourth-year work placement, the university staff informed him that potential employers might search his name, and this was not something he wanted to worry about. Additionally, he believed that "Francis Bourgeois" had "a bit more of a ring to it" than his given name.

== Social media career ==
Bourgeois' initial TikTok posts consisted of fake "interviews" and comedic doctored videos of himself conversing with celebrities over Instagram Live, including English rapper Swarmz, drill artist Digga D, and alt-pop artist Billie Eilish, as well as Kylie Jenner, which garnered him an early following. By May 2021, he had just under 250,000 followers.

In October 2021, two of his videos went viral, the first featuring him at Brighton railway station reacting to a GB Class 73/9 locomotive and the name it was given, "Dick Mabbutt"; this video accumulated over 12 million views. Another shows his reaction to the arrival of a British Rail Class 377 train travelling from Littlehampton to Southampton Central, during which he waves at the train driver and then proceeds to fall out of his chair; the video has garnered over six million views. Later that month, Bourgeois appeared with Josie Gibson on the ITV daytime magazine programme This Morning to discuss the success of his TikTok videos.

In late November 2021, Bourgeois registered Francis Bourgeois Limited as a private limited company. In January 2022, he signed with the Books division of YMU, an international talent management company, and he became a brand ambassador for GB Railfreight. Shortly after, he shot an ASOS promotional video on a GBRf locomotive.

After experiencing a surge in popularity, Joe Jonas contacted Bourgeois; on 12 January 2022, the two picnicked and went trainspotting in rural Milton Keynes. Thereafter, he began posting other collaborations to social media alongside Rosalía, Thierry Henry in a Puma advert, and Sam Fender. In April 2022, he featured in an episode of Amelia Dimoldenberg's web series Amelia's Cooking Show.

Over the summer, Bourgeois spoke at an Advertising Week Europe gathering about creating content that resonates with Gen Z audiences, and he partnered with TikTok for Business to advise users on growing their brands. In May 2022, he appeared at the British Book Awards to present Cressida Cowell with her award. He also shot a series of promotional videos alongside British rapper Aitch for Spotify UK's #SpotifySmallTalks segments.

On 8 May 2022, Bourgeois was sponsored by Williams Racing to attend the 2022 Miami Grand Prix, meeting Alex Albon and Lando Norris. On 23 May 2022, Transport for London gave Bourgeois special access to promote London's new Elizabeth line, making him the first passenger to board the railway's Class 345 train.

In mid-July 2022, Bourgeois helped to promote British family film The Railway Children Return. On 9 July 2022, he promoted Percy Pig's 30th birthday, and he attended a related festival sponsored by M&S Food on 23 July 2022. In late July 2022, he participated in Ben Ainslie's safety training and operated a catamaran at the Great Britain Sail Grand Prix in Plymouth.

On 27 October 2022, Bourgeois' autobiographical novel The Trainspotter's Notebook was published. An audiobook was also recorded, with seven hours of narration provided by Bourgeois. Throughout October and November 2022, Channel 4 released the five-episode digital series Trainspotting with Francis Bourgeois, featuring Aisling Bea, Chloe Burrows, Jesse Lingard, Sam Ryder, and AJ Tracey. On 15 November 2022, Spotify unveiled the Discover List 2022, their second annual showcase of 50 influential creators on the platform across five categories; Bourgeois was categorized as one of five leading "icons."

On 18 November 2022, Trainline launched a social campaign featuring Bourgeois and Craig David to raise awareness of the environmental benefits of traveling by train. On 24 November 2022, he uploaded the first episode of his co-directed series Scooting & Chatting to his new YouTube channel, the first episode featuring Louis Theroux; in turn, the former was interviewed by Theroux for BBC.

On 22 December 2022, Channel 4 released a one-off Trainspotting with Francis Bourgeois Christmas special featuring Tom Daley. After the success of the initial five episodes, the network commissioned three more episodes of Trainspotting with Francis Bourgeois for production, which aired in 2023.

In mid-February 2023, Bourgeois was sponsored by Prologis UK to visit their warehouse at the Daventry International Rail Freight Terminal, a major rail freight hub in Northamptonshire. The campaign served to promote DIRFT, the logistics aspect of supply chain management, and the sustainability benefits of rail freight. In the promotional video, Bourgeois is seen admiring freights on site, as well as scootering through their warehouse.

Bourgeois appeared in episode 2 of the Kathy Burke channel 4 documentary, Kathy Burke: Growing Up, where the former discussed his career.

On 6 April 2023, Bourgeois released a second episode of his self-produced series Scooting & Chatting, featuring Annie Mac.

In October 2026, Bourgeois was announced as one of the contestants in the upcoming Taskmaster New Year Treat VII, which is expected to release in early 2027.

=== Modelling ===
In late 2021, Bourgeois was represented by Manchester-based agency Brother Models.

In January 2022, Bourgeois was featured in the second chapter of a partnership between Gucci and The North Face.

In the photographs and a promotional short film called Full Steam Ahead with Francis Bourgeois (2022) by Highsnobiety, Bourgeois plays the part of a train conductor travelling the Swiss Alps, which were superimposed. The film features the Keighley & Worth Valley Railway, the Oakworth station, and 2MT locomotive No. 78022; it was shot in the Bradford district of West Yorkshire. The film won the award for "best fashion film" at the Berlin Fashion Film Festival 2022.

Bourgeois then appeared on the Gucci Podcast alongside Bryanboy to discuss the relationship between fashion and social media.

In March 2022, Bourgeois starred in Paul Smith's "What Makes You Happy?" campaign, modelling the PS Paul Smith Happy collection.

During London Fashion Week in February 2023, Bourgeois modelled Bay Garnett's "Oxfam Fashion Fighting Poverty" collection at an Oxfam GB x eBay show, which aimed to address poverty and promote sustainable fashion. This event marked his debut on the runway.

=== Fashion-related appearances ===
Throughout 2022, Bourgeois visited various private fashion shows, as well as the Soho House. On 19 March 2022, he was invited to the "Fashioning Masculinities: The Art of Menswear" exhibition at the Victoria and Albert Museum, in partnership with Gucci. In 2022, he attended Daniel Fletcher's February and September AW22 London Fashion Week runway shows, where he met Tom Daley ten months before the two would reconvene for Trainspotting with Francis Bourgeois. In May 2022, he attended Gucci's Cosmogonie Cruise show. In June 2022, he attended a Gucci and Adidas' event at Peckham's Liberal Club commemorating a collaboration between the brands, which he promoted on TikTok prior. In January 2023, Bourgeois attended Gucci's Milan's Menswear Fashion Week AW23 show.

== Public image ==
A signature component of Bourgeois' content is his incorporation of the GoPro fisheye lens, which distorts his face.

Bourgeois claims that certain aspects of his videos are staged, including a video of him falling out of his chair: "I love absurdist humour, so I try to intertwine it. I could just show trains going by, but I also love making people laugh." In most of his trainspotting videos, Bourgeois is often seen wearing vintage railway clothing and what he describes as a "blend between railway memorabilia and streetwear".

In mid-December 2021, Bourgeois was accused of donning a fake online persona after photographs from his adolescence emerged, as well as videos of him raving. His response received over 5 million views and was well received.

== Personal life ==
Bourgeois has named the Class 37 and the Class 158 as some of his favourite rail vehicles, and the Class 170 as his least favourite. Notably, he has included "43" in his Instagram handle. On some occasions, he has been jokingly critical of the Thomas the Tank Engine series for its lack of realism; however, he has commended the show's use of modelling. In a BBC Radio 1 interview, he demonstrated his ability to identify the make and model of a train by its horn sound.

Bourgeois considers scootering a hobby.

Since 2018, Bourgeois has been dating Amy Linkin, a university student and freelance social media videographer.

As of October 2022, Bourgeois has been residing in the Battersea district of London.

=== Fashion ===
Bourgeois takes inspiration from his grandfather's wardrobe, the latter inspiring him to paint one of his fingernails for "good luck".

=== Music ===
Bourgeois is interested in electronic music, favouring artists like Aphex Twin and Squarepusher. He likens the sound of dance music to the industrial sounds produced by locomotives and diesel engines. He also enjoys reggae music by artists like Aba Shanti-I and Augustus Pablo. Other sounds he enjoys are that of English Electric Class 37s, 50s, and 31s.

In 2020, Bourgeois self-released a song called "Whatley Quarry" under the alias Boggy Can, inspired by the Whatley Quarry near where he grew up in Frome, Somerset.

In November 2021, Bourgeois was invited by Sacha Lord to visit and promote Manchester's Warehouse Project, a club that caters to the rave scene. In March 2022, Bourgeois attended the BandLab NME Music Awards. In April 2022, he performed a tailwhip on stage during a Sam Fender concert, who he met at the NME Awards a month prior. In June 2022, he made cameo appearances in a music video for South London rapper Pinty's song "Flex/On My Own."

== Filmography ==
=== Television ===
| Year | Title | Role | Notes |
|---|---|---|---|
| 2023 | Kathy Burke: Growing Up | Himself | Series 1 episode 2; Channel 4 documentary |
| 2025 | The Travel Show | Presenter | Episode titled "My Great Malaysian Railway Adventure" |
| 2025 | The Wheel | Participant | Series 6 episode 3; BBC 1 gameshow |
| 2026 | Mission to Space | Presenter | Two-part Channel 4 documentary |
| 2026 | The Grand Tour | Co-presenter | Reboot series; With Thomas Holland & James Engelsman |
| 2026 | Francis Bourgeois and Chris Harris: We Saved a Train | Co-presenter | With Chris Harris; 1 series (8 episodes) |
| 2027 | Taskmaster | Participant | New Year Treat VII special |

=== Web series ===
| Year | Title | Role | Notes |
|---|---|---|---|
| 2022 | Full Steam Ahead with Francis Bourgeois | Train conductor | Short film by Highsnobiety promoting the collaborative campaign by Gucci and The North Face |
| 2022 | Amelia's Cooking Show | Himself | YouTube series created by Amelia Dimoldenberg |
| 2022–2023 | Trainspotting with Francis Bourgeois | Himself | 5 episodes, 1 special, 3 episodes in production; Channel 4 digital series |
| 2022 | Scooting and Chatting | Himself | Self-directed series on his YouTube channel; 2 episodes |

== Bibliography ==
- The Trainspotter's Notebook (2022)

== Awards and nominations ==
| Year | Ceremony | Award | Result | Ref. |
|---|---|---|---|---|
| 2022 | Broadcasting Press Guild Awards | Emerging Creators Award | Nominated | |
