= The Gulf Between Us =

2009 novel by Geraldine Bedell

- First edition
- Author: Geraldine Bedell
- Genre: Romantic comedy
- Publisher: Penguin Books
- Publication date: 2009

The Gulf Between Us is a 2009 novel by Geraldine Bedell. The novel is a romantic comedy set in a fictional Gulf emirate, with a word play on the region.

The book drew wide public attention when the author falsely claimed she had been uninvited from a planned appearance at the first International Festival of Literature in Dubai in 2009 because The Gulf Between Us featured a homosexual sheikh.
