= Valentines High School =

Coeducational secondary school in Ilford

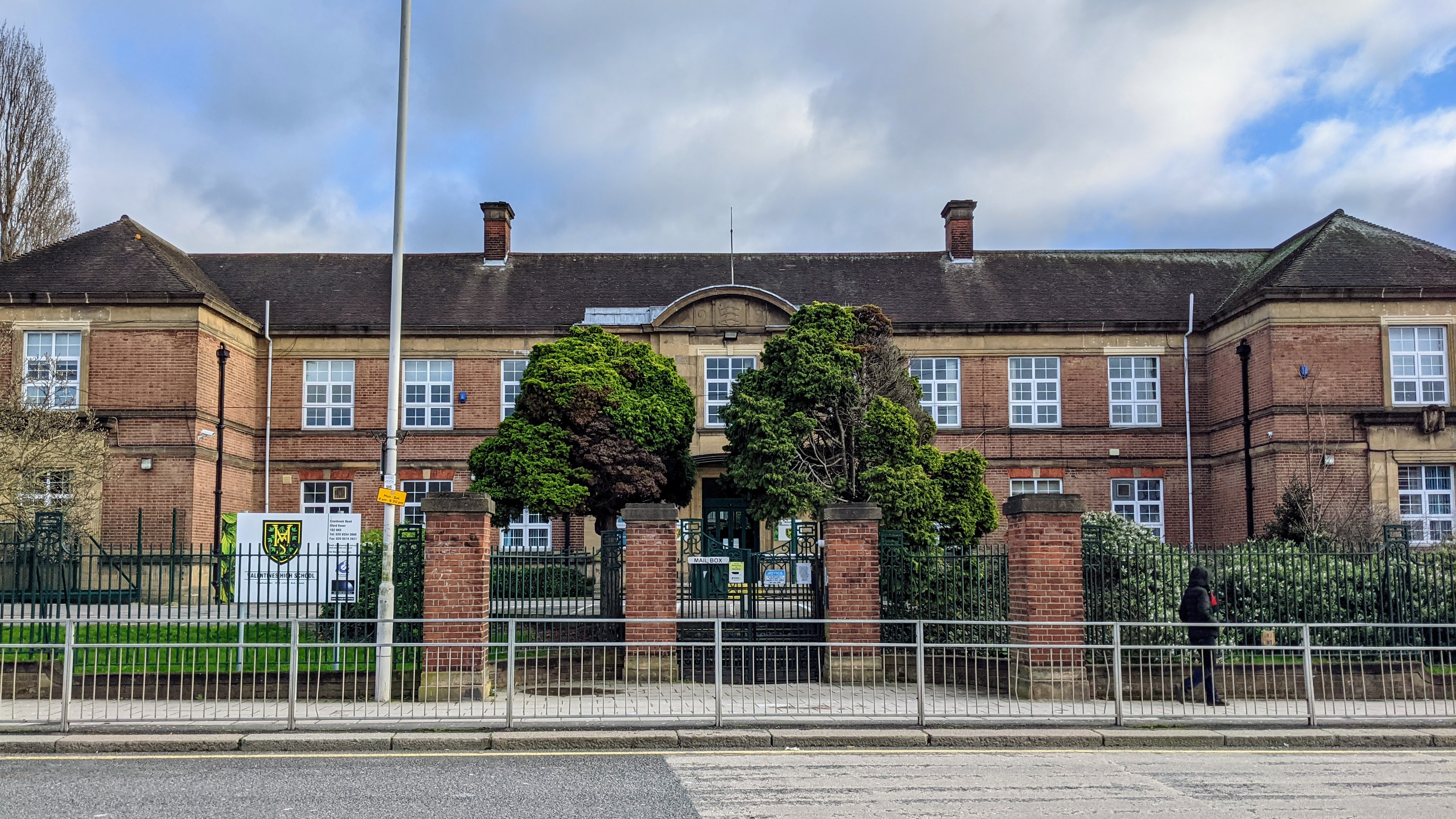

Location
- Cranbrook Road; Ilford, London, IG2 6HX; England; 51.5741°N 0.067°E

Information
- Type: Community school
- Motto: Latin: Consequi Magnitudo In Concordia; In Harmony, Achieving Excellence
- Local authority: Redbridge
- Department for Education URN: 102857 Tables
- Ofsted: Reports
- Chair of Governors: Matthew Midlane
- Headteacher: Richard Laws
- Gender: Coeducational
- Age: 11 to 18
- Enrolment: ~1300
- Website: http://www.valentines-sch.org.uk/

Valentines High School is a coeducational secondary school and sixth form located in the Ilford area of the London Borough of Redbridge. It has approximately 1300 pupils and 93 teachers. Valentines has been a teaching school since 2011, and is a member of the Leading Edge partnership programme. In 2006, it was designated as a specialist school for technology and had technology college status.

== History ==
The school was first opened in 1901 as the Park Higher Grade School, a coeducational secondary school, located at the opposite side of Valentines Park from the school's present location. The school had over 600 places and taught Latin and French among other subjects.

In 1929, the girls' wing of the school was moved to a new building on Cranbrook Road and was named Ilford County High School for Girls, a selective grammar school for girls, while the original site became known as Ilford County High School for Boys, which in 1935 moved to its present-day location in Barkingside. In 1977, the school was renamed Valentines High School, and became coeducational, admitting boys for the first time the following year.

In 2007, a new sixth-form building was opened with state-of-the-art physical education facilities including a new astro-turf pitch, tennis courts, sports hall, and drama studio. The sixth-form building currently houses the history, and business departments. Following demographic changes to the local area, the school has become very multicultural, with more than 80% of pupils speaking a first language other than English.

The current headteacher, Mr Richard Laws, took over as acting Headteacher in 2014, taking over from Mrs Sylvia Jones, who was Headteacher for over 10 years. The former PE teacher has put an emphasis on "discipline, respect and good behaviour" and considerably reduced the size of the sixth form.

Currently, the school is extremely culturally and ethnically diverse. Over three-quarters of the school's students speak English as an additional language, while the proportion of students eligible for free school meals is above the national average.

== Results ==
The school was last inspected by Ofsted in 2026, when it was graded 'outstanding' in every category.

In 2022, 73% of students achieved Grade 5 or above in English and Maths GCSEs, placing the school in the top-bracket of non-selective schools.

== Notable former pupils and teachers ==
- Bolu Babalola, writer
- Hamzah Sheeraz, boxer
- Nina Bawden, CBE, novelist and children's writer
- Elaine Bedell, OBE, television producer and executive
- Marion Foale, artist and fashion designer
- Rebecca Front, BAFTA award-winning actress, the Thick of It, Lewis and Humans
- Dame Kathleen Lonsdale, DBE, FRS (1903 – 1971), was a British crystallographer, pacifist, and prison reform activist. first woman, along with microbiologist Marjory Stephenson, admitted as a Fellow to the Royal Society.
- Dawn Neesom, editor of the Daily Star from 2003 to 2018
- Nigel Paterson, musician and former Head of Music at Valentines High School
- Gary Stevenson, YouTuber, author, and financial trader
- Barbara Yung (1959 – 1985), 1980s Hong Kong TV actress, widely known in Cantonese-speaking audiences of Southeast Asia
