= Andy Wilman =

English television producer (born 1962)

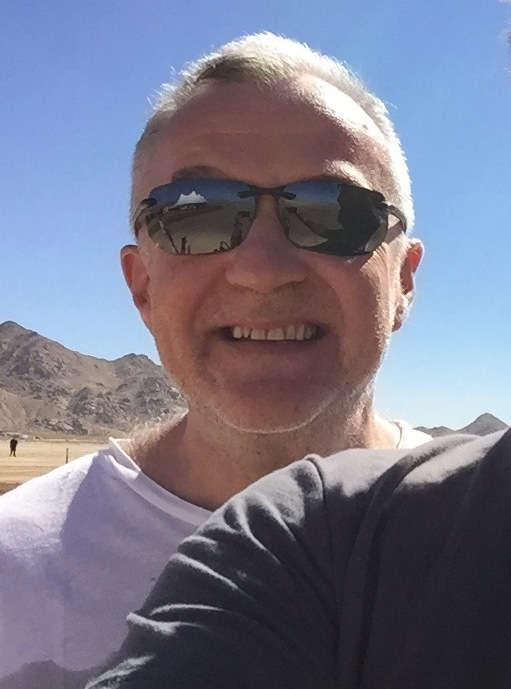
- Wilman at the shooting of the opening scene for The Grand Tour in 2016
- Born: Andrew Neville Wilman; 16 August 1962 (age 64); Glossop, Derbyshire, England
- Education: Repton School
- Occupations: Television producer; author
- Years active: 1994–present
- Employer: Amazon Studios
- Known for: Top Gear (2002–2015); The Grand Tour (2016–present); Clarkson's Farm (2021–present)

Andrew Neville Wilman (born 16 August 1962) is an English television producer who is best known as the co-creator (with Jeremy Clarkson) and former executive producer of the Top Gear show, from 2002 to 2015, as well as being the executive producer of The Grand Tour and Clarkson's Farm. He was responsible for much of the show's style and humour, along with Jeremy Clarkson, Richard Hammond and James May.

== Early life ==
Wilman attended Repton School along with Clarkson and Formula One designer Adrian Newey.

== Career ==
After leaving school, Wilman was a member of a punk rock band, and worked in various jobs, later studying American and Russian Studies at university. Subsequently, Jeremy Clarkson persuaded Wilman to successfully apply for a job as a writer for Auto Express magazine. When Top Gear Magazine was launched in 1993, Wilman was appointed features editor, also presenting several segments in the original Top Gear TV series. His first TV production job was on Jeremy Clarkson's Motorworld, which was followed by several more TV shows he produced with Clarkson as presenter.

After the original format of Top Gear was cancelled by the BBC, Wilman and ex-presenter Clarkson pitched a new format, which launched in 2002, with Wilman as executive producer. Prior to which he appeared as lead singer with Ed Gasket & The Flat 4 at Blimpstock, 17 May 2001.

Wilman and Clarkson's company Bedder 6, which handled merchandise and international distribution for Top Gear, earned over £149m in revenue in 2012, prior to a restructuring that gave BBC Worldwide full control of the Top Gear rights.

In April 2015, Wilman announced he had resigned as executive producer of BBC Television's Top Gear following Jeremy Clarkson's exit in March 2015, owing to Clarkson's "fracas" with a producer. Wilman became the executive producer of The Grand Tour that he, Clarkson, Richard Hammond, and James May produced via their company W. Chump & Sons for release via Amazon Video to Amazon Prime customers. While not appearing on the show, Wilman was often referenced as "Mr Wilman" or "Neville", sending the others texts, which gave them challenges, missions, and often insults.

In 2019 after three series, The Grand Tour changed formats, no longer producing episodic series and instead producing only individual episodes similar to specials from previous series. The group closed the W. Chump & Sons production company, stating it was no longer necessary based on the amount of content being created. Wilman also stated he would be doing a solo project for Amazon, which would be produced following projects from Clarkson, Hammond and May.

On 17 April 2020 Wilman was reported to have contracted COVID-19, and reportedly had difficulty in breathing and was severely affected, leading to delays of the upcoming Grand Tour Specials.

== Works ==
=== As producer ===
- Jeremy Clarkson's Motorworld (1995–1996)
- Jeremy Clarkson's Extreme Machines (1998)
- Jeremy Clarkson: Meets the Neighbours (2002)
- Top Gear (2002–2015)
- The Victoria Cross: For Valour (2003)
- Jeremy Clarkson: The Greatest Raid of All Time (2007)
- The Grand Tour (2016–present)
- Clarkson's Farm (2021–present)

=== As presenter ===
- Top Gear (appeared in 35 episodes, 1994–2001)

== Awards ==
Year	Award	Project	Result	Co-recipient
2005	BAFTA TV Award	Top Gear	Nominated	Jeremy Clarkson, Gary Broadhurst
2004	BAFTA TV Award	Top Gear	Nominated	Gary Hunter, Jeremy Clarkson
