= Elaine Bedell =

English television producer and executive

Elaine Bedell OBE
- Born: Elaine Anne Bedell; 1960 (age 65–66); London, England
- Education: University of Leeds
- Occupations: Television producer and executive
- Years active: 1987–
- Spouse(s): Clive Brill (1990–)
- Children: 2
- Relatives: Geraldine Bedell (sister)

Elaine Anne Bedell OBE (born September 1960) is an English television producer and executive, currently CEO of the Southbank Centre, London, a complex of artistic venues. Her former roles include Director of Comedy and Entertainment at ITV, and Executive Chair of the Edinburgh International Television Festival.

== Early life ==
Bedell was raised in East London. Her sister is the novelist Geraldine Bedell. She attended a girls' grammar school in East London (formerly Essex), which became Valentines High School in 1977. She studied English at the University of Leeds, graduating in 1983.

== Career ==
She began her career at the BBC in 1987, producing radio programmes such as Start the Week, Midweek, Newstand and You and Yours on BBC Radio 4.

=== Independent media ===
She left the BBC in 1992 and became Head of Factual Entertainment at Tiger Aspect Productions. In 1994, she became managing director of Watchmaker Productions, a company she founded with Clive James and Richard Drewett. Watchmaker was responsible for Jeremy Clarkson's interview programme Clarkson (1998–2001) which was shown on BBC Two, and produced by Bedell. The company was bought by the Chrysalis Group in 1998, and she became managing director of Chrysalis Entertainment from 2000.

Bedell then joined the Royal Shakespeare Company in 2002, establishing a commercial division, Royal Shakespeare Company Enterprise Ltd.

=== BBC Television ===
Bedell returned to the BBC as Independent Executive, where she oversaw the relationship between BBC Television and independent production companies. She became Commissioning Editor for Features and Factual Entertainment in July 2005. She commissioned The One Show in 2006, and in Factual Entertainment she worked with Emma Swain, Adam Kemp, Richard Klein and Peter Horrocks. In November 2006 she became the Controller of BBC Entertainment, Multi-Platform Commissioning, working with Jana Bennett, the Director of BBC Vision.

=== ITV Network ===
She joined ITV as Director of Entertainment and Comedy in March 2009.

=== Edinburgh International Television Festival ===
From 2011 to 2014, Bedell was Executive Chair of the committee that manages the annual Edinburgh International Television Festival.

=== Southbank Centre ===
In 2017, Bedell was appointed CEO of the Southbank Centre. Her salary and bonus amounted to £194k in 2017/18, increasing to £241k in 2018/2019. In response to the COVID-19 pandemic, which halted live performances, the organisation furloughed most of its 600 employees, and in July 2020 proposed to make up to 400 redundant. The PCS union protested against proposals to reduce previously agreed redundancy payments.

Bedell was appointed Officer of the Order of the British Empire (OBE) in the 2024 New Year Honours for services to business and the arts.

== Personal life ==
Bedell is married to Clive Brill, who is also a former BBC radio drama producer. She met her husband in a school play of War and Peace, playing Natasha and Pierre. The couple married in 1990 and have a son (born 1991) and a daughter.
