= The Victoria Cross: For Valour =

- Opening title
- Created by: Jeremy Clarkson
- Directed by: Richard Pearson
- Presented by: Jeremy Clarkson
- Country of origin: United Kingdom
- No. of episodes: 1

Production
- Producer: Andy Wilman
- Running time: 60 minutes

Original release
- Network: BBC
- Release: 4 November 2003

The Victoria Cross: For Valour is a 2003 BBC television historical documentary presented by Jeremy Clarkson. Clarkson examines the history of the Victoria Cross, and follows the story of one of the 1,358 men who were awarded it: Major Robert Henry Cain for his actions during Operation Market Garden. The main part of the programme was to describe how in September 1944, Major Cain won what was described as the "finest Victoria Cross of the whole war" by his commanding officer Lt Col Derek McNally. At the end of the programme, Clarkson reveals that Cain was his father-in-law; his then-wife, Frances Cain, had no idea her father was a VC recipient until after his death in 1974.

Clarkson also reveals the history of the medal itself and how it is, and always has been, manufactured by the small London jeweller Hancocks & Co. The bronze itself is from the melted-down breeches of a Chinese-made cannon captured from the Russians during the Siege of Sevastopol in the Crimean War. At the time of the programme's production the remaining lump contained only enough metal to create around a further 80 additional VCs. It is kept locked away in a safe in a military storage depot in MoD Donnington near Telford.

This programme is available on BBC Archive under production code ICFD015F.
