= Nigel Paterson (musician) =

British musician

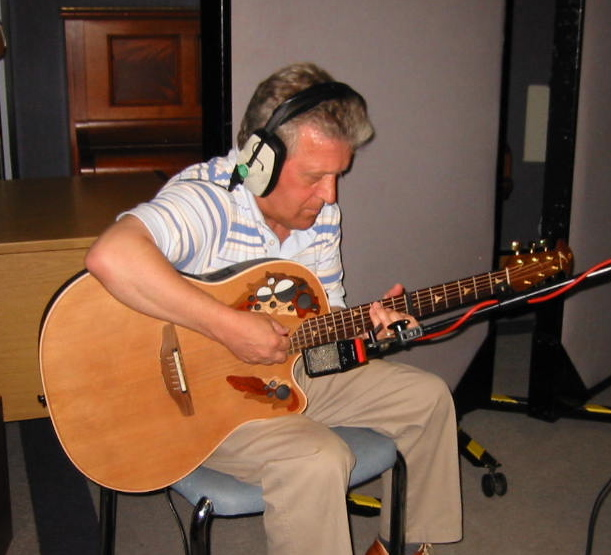
Nigel Paterson

Nigel Paul Paterson is a British musician. Paterson began his career in the early 1960s, singing, playing the guitar, mandolin and tenor recorder in the folk group The Halliard, with Dave Moran and Nic Jones.

In 1971 Paterson graduated from Brentwood College of Education (Anglia Ruskin University) where he studied composition, harmony, counterpoint and orchestration with Harold Dexter and contemporary composers' working methods with Annea Lockwood. Paterson also studied classical guitar at Trinity College, London. After teaching for a few years, Paterson freelanced, playing the guitar, arranging and composing for Chappell & Co., Boston Music (USA) and International Music Publications. Several of his guitar arrangements have been featured regularly on French, Spanish and Mexican television An original choral work Here is the News received its first performance at The Royal Albert Hall on 18 May 1972 performed by The Southend Schools Music Association Junior Choir. Paterson was invited to conduct at The Royal Albert Hall three times between 1990 and 2000.

Paterson returned to education in 1984 and became Head of Music at Valentines High School, a post he held until his retirement in 2003. In retirement, Nigel contents himself by writing the occasional musical analysis of new music, sent to him by burgeoning composers. Nigel Paterson is a member of the Musicians Union PRS for Music and Equity
