= Driven to Distraction (book) =

Non-fiction work by Jeremy Clarkson

- Author: Jeremy Clarkson
- Language: English
- Genre: Factual; Sports writing
- Publisher: Penguin
- Publication date: 2009
- Publication place: United Kingdom
- Media type: Paperback (2010)
- Pages: 466
- ISBN: 978-0-14-104420-0
- Preceded by: For Crying Out Loud!

Driven to Distraction is a non-fiction book, first published in 2009, written by English journalist and television presenter Jeremy Clarkson. The book is a collection of Clarkson's articles for the Sunday Times newspaper, all originally published in 2006 and 2007. The articles consist of car reviews combined with rants on current events.

Part II of the book consists of a small number of Clarkson's articles other than his regular automobile column on topics including travel, restaurant reviews and an account of his trip to Iraq.

== Reception ==
Liz Hunt, of The Daily Telegraph, found Clarkson "very funny", with "his well-honed political incorrectness [...] an absolute joy".
