= Jeremy Clarkson =

English television presenter, journalist, author and farmer (born 1960)

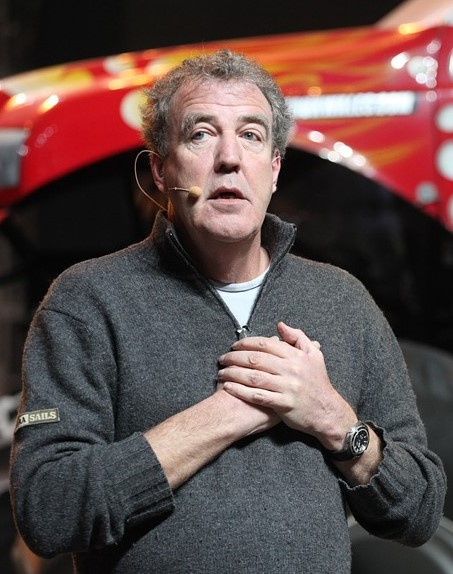
- Clarkson in 2012
- Born: Jeremy Charles Robert Clarkson; 11 April 1960 (age 66); Sprotbrough, West Riding of Yorkshire, England
- Occupations: Journalist; broadcaster; columnist; writer; farmer
- Years active: 1988–present
- Employers: BBC (1988–2015); The Sunday Times (1993–present); The Sun (1996–present); Amazon (2016–present); ITV (2018–present)
- Notable credits: Top Gear (1988–2000); Top Gear (2002–2015); The Grand Tour (2016–2024); Who Wants to Be a Millionaire? (2018–present); Clarkson's Farm (2021–present); Millionaire Hot Seat (2026–present)
- Spouses: Alexandra James (m. 1989; div. 1990); Frances Cain (m. 1993; div. 2014)
- Partner: Lisa Hogan (2017–present)
- Children: 3

Jeremy Charles Robert Clarkson (born 11 April 1960) is an English television presenter, journalist, author and TV farmer who is best known for hosting the motoring television programmes Top Gear (2002–2015) and The Grand Tour (2016–2024) alongside Richard Hammond and James May. He hosts the quiz show Who Wants to Be a Millionaire? (2018–present) and its spin-off Millionaire Hot Seat (2026–present), and stars in the farming documentary series Clarkson's Farm (2021–present). In 2006, the British public ranked Clarkson number 19 in ITV's poll of TV's 50 Greatest Stars.

From a career as a local journalist in northern England, Clarkson rose to public prominence as a presenter of the original format of Top Gear from 1988 to 2000. Since the mid-1990s, he has become a recognised public personality, regularly appearing on British television presenting his own shows for the BBC and appearing as a guest on other shows. As well as motoring, Clarkson has produced programmes on subjects such as history and engineering; he has also written numerous books, primarily on cars. In 1998, he hosted the first series of Robot Wars. From 1998 to 2000, he also hosted his own talk show on BBC Two, entitled Clarkson.

In 2002 Clarkson, alongside producer Andy Wilman, devised the relaunched Top Gear, which he hosted alongside Richard Hammond, Jason Dawe and later James May. The revised show became the most widely-broadcast factual television show in the world. In 2015, the BBC elected not to renew his contract after he assaulted a Top Gear producer while filming on location. That year, Clarkson and his Top Gear co-presenters and Wilman formed the production company W. Chump & Sons to produce The Grand Tour for Amazon Prime Video.

Clarkson also writes weekly columns for The Sunday Times and The Sun. His opinionated but humorous tongue-in-cheek writing and presenting style has often been the subject of controversy. Clarkson's controversial statements and actions, both privately and as a television presenter, have also resulted in criticism from the media, politicians, pressure groups, and the public. He also has a significant public following, being credited as a major factor in the resurgence of Top Gear as one of the most popular shows on the BBC.

Since 2019, Clarkson has been a farmer at Diddly Squat Farm for his show, Clarkson's Farm. The show received a positive reception and became a popular show on Prime Video upon its release. In May 2024, the "Clarkson's clause" amendment, named after him, was introduced; this clause makes it easier to convert unused agricultural buildings to commercial usage, something he did in the second series of the show when planning permission for his restaurant was denied.

== Early life ==
=== Childhood ===
Jeremy Charles Robert Clarkson was born on 11 April 1960 in Sprotbrough, then part of the West Riding of Yorkshire, England. He is the son of Shirley Gabrielle Clarkson (née Ward), a teacher, and Edward Grenville Clarkson, a travelling salesman. His parents, who ran a business selling tea cosies, put their son's name down in advance for private schools, with no idea how they were going to pay the fees. However, shortly before his admission, when he was 13, his parents made two Paddington Bear stuffed toys for Clarkson and his sister Joanna. These proved so popular they started selling them through the business. Because they were manufacturing and selling the bears without regard to intellectual property rights, upon his becoming aware of the bears Michael Bond took action through his solicitors. Edward Clarkson travelled to London to meet Bond's lawyer. By coincidence, he met Bond in the lift; the two struck up an immediate rapport. Consequently, Bond awarded the Clarksons the licensing of the bear rights throughout the world, with the family eventually selling to Britain's then leading toystore, Hamleys. The income from this success enabled the Clarksons to be able to pay the fees for Jeremy to attend Hill House School, South Yorkshire, and later Repton School, Derbyshire.

=== Repton School ===
Clarkson has stated he was deeply unhappy at Repton School. Clarkson said that he had been a "suicidal wreck" there, having experienced extreme bullying. He alleged that:

I suffered many terrible things. I was thrown on an hourly basis into the ice plunge pool, dragged from my bed in the middle of the night and beaten, made to lick the lavatories clean and all the usual humiliations that... turn a small boy into a gibbering, sobbing, suicidal wreck... they glued my records together, snapped my compass, ate my biscuits, defecated in my tuck box and they cut my trousers in half.

According to his own account, Clarkson was expelled from Repton School for "drinking, smoking and generally making a nuisance of himself". He famously left with one C and two U (fail) grades at A level. Clarkson attended Repton alongside future Formula One engineer Adrian Newey and former Top Gear Executive Producer Andy Wilman. He played the role of a preparatory school pupil, Atkinson, in a BBC radio Children's Hour serial adaptation of Anthony Buckeridge's Jennings novels until his voice broke.

== Career ==
=== Writing career ===
Clarkson's first job was as a travelling salesman for his parents' business, selling Paddington Bear toys. He later trained as a journalist with the Rotherham Advertiser, before also writing for the Rochdale Observer, Wolverhampton Express and Star, Lincolnshire Life, Shropshire Star and the Associated Kent Newspapers. When writing in 2015 in his final column for Top Gear magazine, he credited the Shropshire Star as his first outlet as a motoring columnist: "I started small, on the Shropshire Star with little Peugeots and Fiats and worked my way up to Ford Granadas and Rovers until, after about seven years, I was allowed to drive an Aston Martin Lagonda... It was 10 years before I drove my first Lamborghini."

In 1984, Clarkson formed the Motoring Press Agency (MPA), with fellow motoring journalist Jonathan Gill, where he conducted road tests for local newspapers and automotive magazines. This developed into articles for publications such as Performance Car. He has regularly written for Top Gear magazine since its launch in 1993. In 1987, Clarkson wrote for Amstrad Computer User and compiled Amstrad CPC game reviews.

Clarkson writes regular columns in the tabloid newspaper The Sun, and for the broadsheet newspaper The Sunday Times. His columns in the Times are republished in The Weekend Australian newspaper. He also writes for the "Wheels" section of the Toronto Star. He has written humorous books about cars and several other subjects; many of his books are collections of articles that he has written for The Sunday Times.

=== Television ===
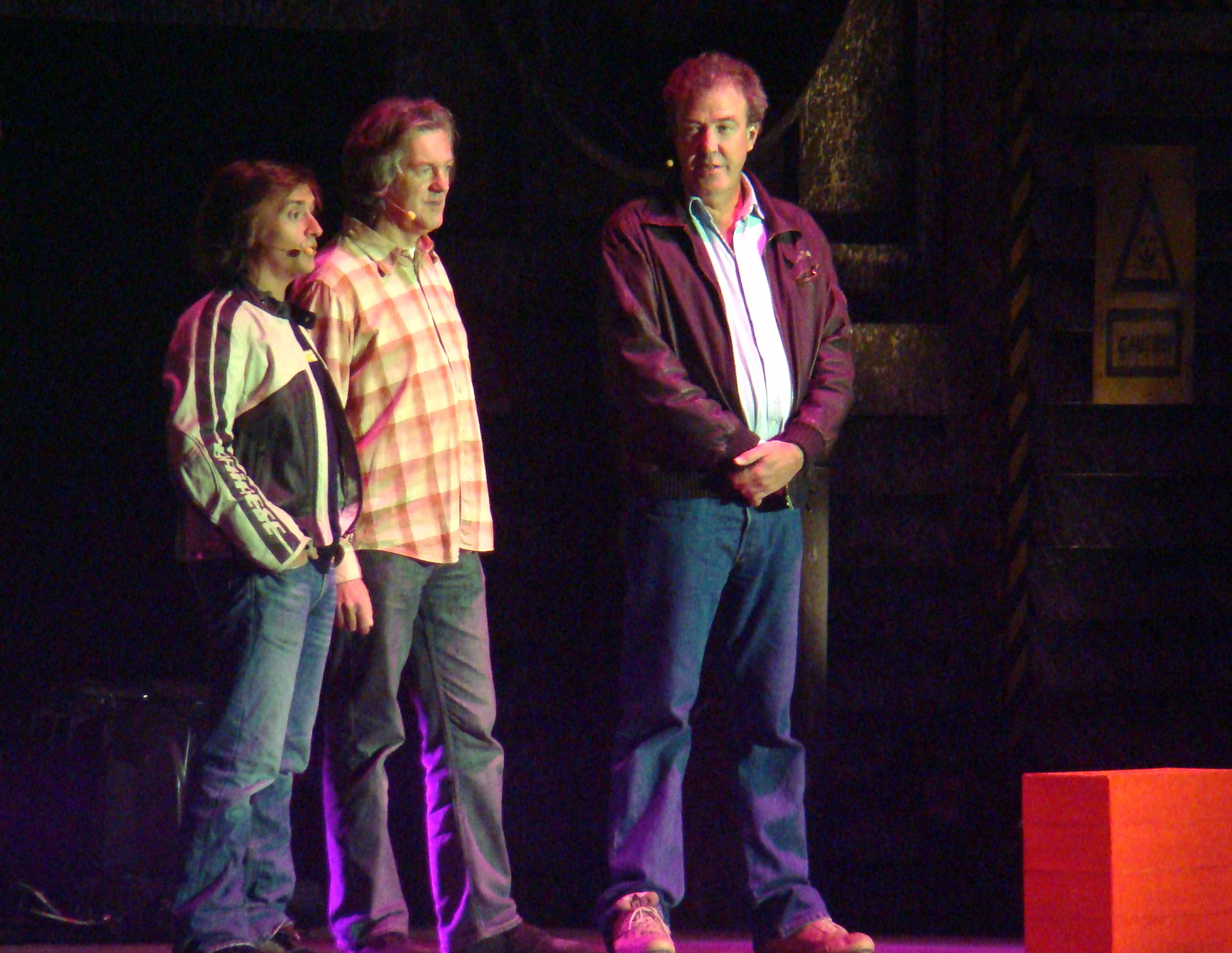
Clarkson (right) with his fellow Top Gear presenters, Richard Hammond and James May, in 2008

Clarkson's first major television role came as one of the presenters on the British motoring programme Top Gear, from 27 October 1988 to 3 March 1999, in the programme's earlier format. Jon Bentley, a researcher at Top Gear, helped launch his television career. Clarkson got the job after a screen test in which he spent 20 minutes ranting about the awfulness of the Citroen 2CV. Shortly afterwards, Bentley became the show's producer, and said about hiring Clarkson:

He was just what I was looking for—an enthusiastic motoring writer who could make cars on telly fun. He was opinionated and irreverent, rather than respectfully po-faced. The fact that he looked and sounded exactly like a twenty-something ex-public schoolboy didn't matter. Nor did the impression there was a hint of school bully about him. I knew he was the man for the job. [...] Clarkson stood out because he was funny. Even my bosses allowed themselves the odd titter.

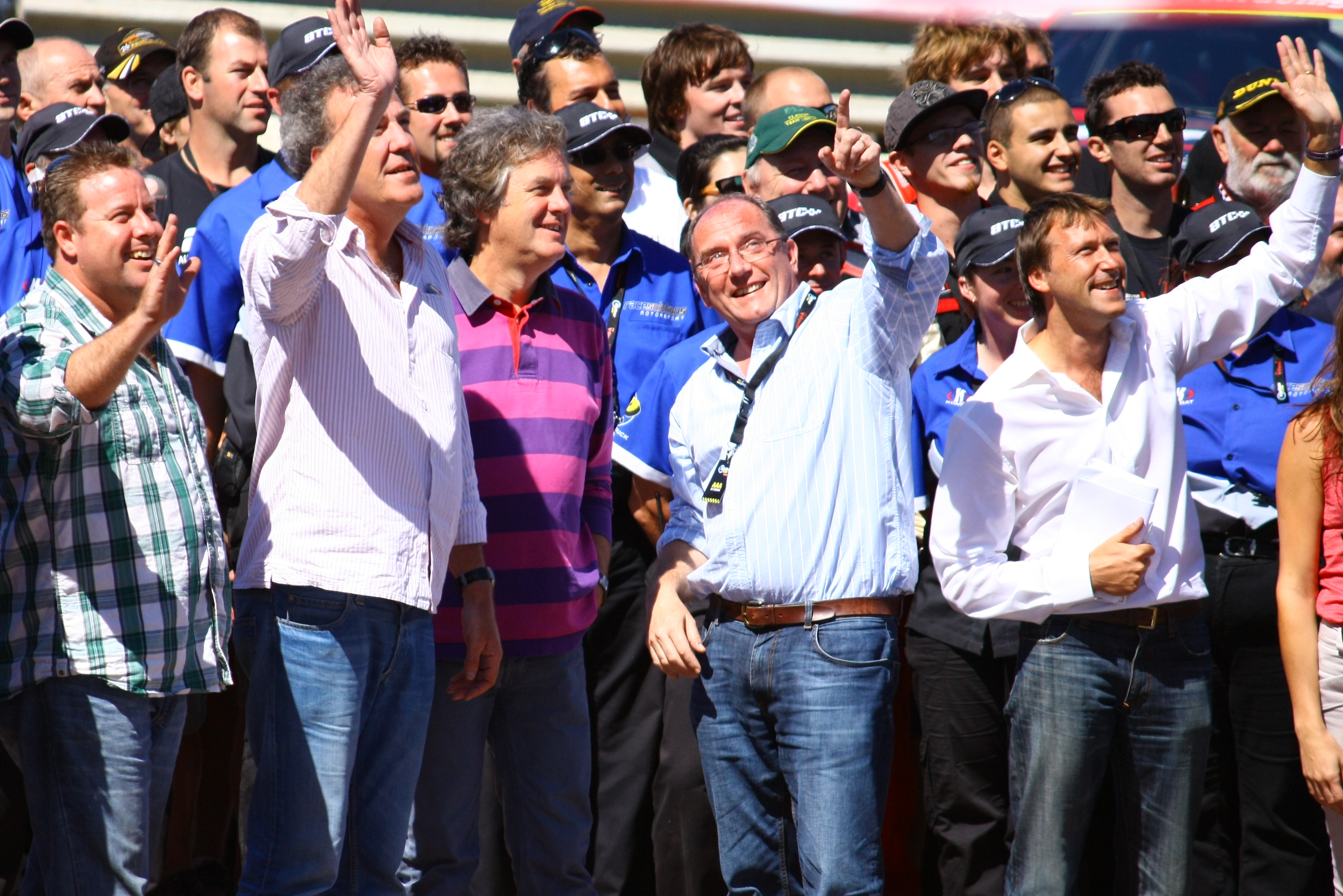
Clarkson (second from left) at the 2011 Top Gear Live show, along with James May (third from left) and Shane Jacobson (far left)

Clarkson then also presented the show's new format from 20 October 2002, to 8 March 2015. Along with co-presenters James May and Richard Hammond, he is credited with turning Top Gear into the most-watched TV show on BBC Two; the program is rebroadcast to over 100 countries around the world. Clarkson's company Bedder 6, which handled merchandise and international distribution for Top Gear, earned over £149m in revenue in 2012, prior to a restructuring that gave BBC Worldwide full control of the Top Gear rights.

Clarkson presented the first series of the UK version of Robot Wars. In an on-set accident, a robot's weapon flew off and became lodged in the wall inches from Clarkson. His talk show, Clarkson, comprised 27 half-hour episodes aired in the United Kingdom between November 1998 and December 2000; the programme featured guest interviews with musicians, politicians and television personalities. Clarkson went on to present documentaries focused on non-motoring themes such as history and engineering, although the motoring shows and videos continued. Alongside his stand-alone shows, many mirror the format of his newspaper columns and books, combining his love of driving and motoring journalism, with the examination and expression of his other views on the world, such as in Jeremy Clarkson's Motorworld, Jeremy Clarkson's Car Years and Jeremy Clarkson Meets the Neighbours.

After Trinny and Susannah labelled Clarkson's dress sense as that of a market trader, he was persuaded to appear on their fashion makeover show What Not to Wear to avoid being considered for their all-time worst dressed winner award. Their attempts at restyling Clarkson were rebuffed, and Clarkson stated he would rather eat his own hair than appear on the show again. For an episode of the first series of the BBC's Who Do You Think You Are? broadcast in November 2004, Clarkson was invited to investigate his family history. It included the story of his great-great-great-grandfather, John Kilner (1792–1857), who invented the Kilner jar, a container for preserved fruit.

Clarkson's views are often showcased on television shows. In 1997, Clarkson appeared on the light-hearted comedy show Room 101, in which a guest nominates things they hate in life to be consigned to nothingness. Clarkson dispatched caravans, houseflies, the sitcom Last of the Summer Wine, the mentality within golf clubs, and vegetarians. He has made several appearances on the prime time talk shows Parkinson and Friday Night with Jonathan Ross since 2002. By 2003, his persona was deemed to fit the mould for the series Grumpy Old Men, in which middle-aged men talk about any aspects of modern life which irritate them. Since the topical news panel show Have I Got News for You dismissed regular host Angus Deayton in October 2002, Clarkson has become one of the most regularly used guest hosts on the show. Clarkson has appeared as a panellist on the political current affairs television show Question Time twice since 2000. On 2 October 2015, he presented Have I Got News for You again for the first time since his dismissal from Top Gear.

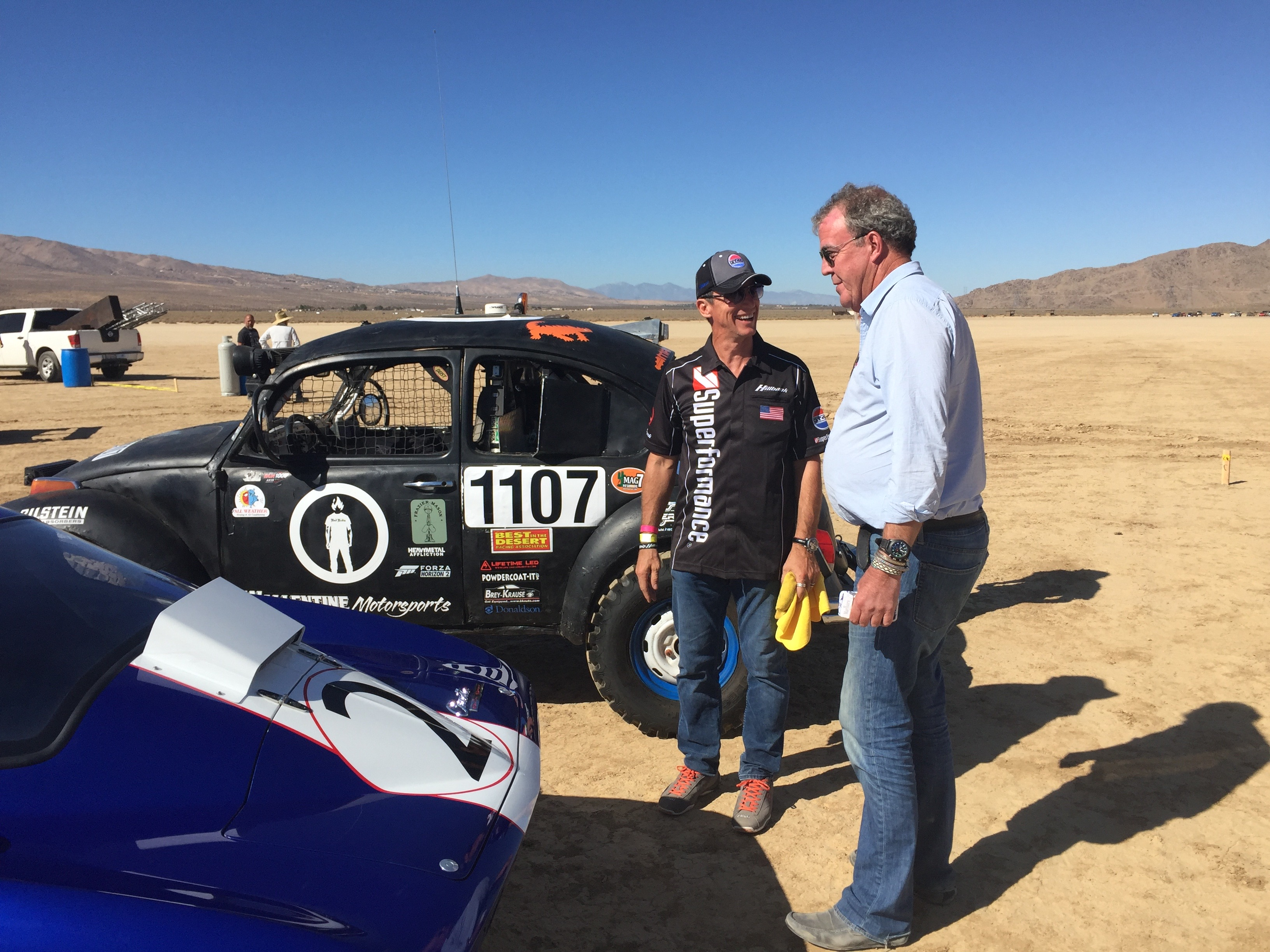
Clarkson during filming for The Holy Trinity opening sequence of The Grand Tour in the Lucerne Valley, California in September 2016

Clarkson received a BAFTA nomination for Best Entertainment Performance in 2006. Jonathan Ross ended up winning the award. He won the National Television Awards Special Recognition Award in 2007, and reportedly earned £1 million that same year for his role as a Top Gear presenter, and a further £1.7 million from books, DVDs and newspaper columns. Clarkson and co-presenter James May were the first people to reach the north magnetic pole in a car also in 2007, chronicled in Top Gear: Polar Special.

Clarkson sustained minor injuries to his legs, back and hand in an intentional collision with a brick wall while making the 12th series of Top Gear in 2008. In 2014, he received a £4.8 million dividend and an £8.4 million share buyout from BBC Worldwide, bringing his estimated income for the year to more than £14 million. On 30 July 2015, it was announced that Clarkson, along with former Top Gear hosts Richard Hammond and James May would present a new show on Amazon Prime Video. The first season was made available worldwide in 2016. On 11 May 2016, Clarkson confirmed on his Twitter feed that the series would be titled The Grand Tour, and air from a different location each week. On 9 March 2018, it was announced that Clarkson would host a revamped series of Who Wants to Be a Millionaire? on ITV.

== Opinions and influence ==
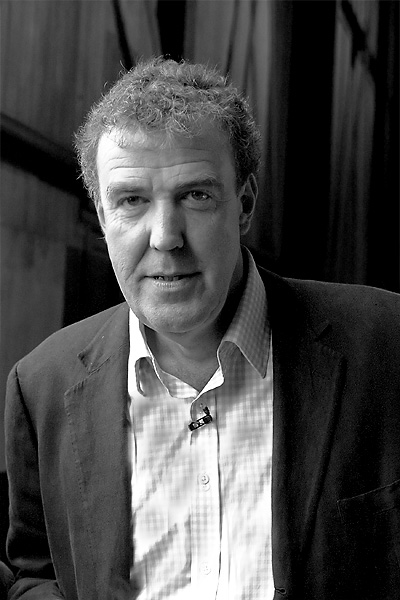
Clarkson in 2006

=== Politics ===
Clarkson is a longstanding supporter of the Conservative Party and spoke at its conference in 2026. He identifies as a libertarian in favour of personal freedom and against government regulation, stating that government should "build park benches and that is it. They should leave us alone." He has a particular contempt for the Health and Safety Executive. He often criticised the Labour governments of Tony Blair and Gordon Brown, especially what he calls the "ban" culture; he frequently fixates on the smoking ban and the 2004 ban on fox hunting. In April 2013, Clarkson was among 2,000 invited guests to the funeral of former prime minister Margaret Thatcher. Clarkson is also a friend of former prime minister David Cameron.

In an attempt to prove that the public furore over the 2007 UK child benefit data scandal was unjustified, Clarkson published his own bank account number and sort code, together with instructions on how to find out his address, in The Sun newspaper, expecting nobody to be able to remove money from his account. He later discovered that someone had set up a monthly direct debit for £500 to Diabetes UK.

Clarkson often comments on the media-perceived social issues of the day, such as the fear of challenging adolescent youths, which he calls "hoodies". In 2007, Clarkson was cleared of allegations of assaulting a young person while visiting central Milton Keynes, after Thames Valley Police said that if anything, he had been the victim. As a motoring journalist, he is frequently critical of government initiatives such as the London congestion charge or proposals on road charging. He is also frequently scornful of caravanners and cyclists. He has often singled out John Prescott, the former Transport Minister, and Stephen Joseph, the head of the public transport pressure group Transport 2000, for ridicule.

In September 2013, Clarkson's tweet proposing that he might stand for election as an independent candidate in Doncaster North, the constituency of the then Labour leader of the opposition, Ed Miliband, was retweeted over 1,000 times—including by John Prescott. Clarkson has been critical of the Special Relationship between the United States and the United Kingdom. He referred to the US as the "United States of Total Paranoia", commenting that one needs a permit to do everything except for purchasing weapons. In 2017, in response to the United States officially recognising Jerusalem as the capital of Israel, Clarkson advised Palestinians to recognise London as the capital of the United States.

In 2020 Clarkson expressed support for Labour leader Keir Starmer and said he was prepared to vote for Labour "if there's an election tomorrow", citing Boris Johnson's handling of the COVID-19 pandemic. However, in 2023 he expressed criticism of Starmer's proposed economic and education policies. Ahead of the 2024 general election, Clarkson reversed his previous view on Starmer and stated "I get, of course, that people are fed up with the Tories, but I'd rather vote for my dog than Sir Starmer's merry bunch of ideological nincompoops", citing his opposition to Labour's stance on farming.

In September 2022, Clarkson described socialists as "disgusting people". Following the death of Queen Elizabeth II, Clarkson shared a statement written by Boris Johnson on Twitter and captioned it "I was trying to think of something to say but Boris Johnson has said it all" and referred to the Queen as a "magnificent monarch". In January 2023, Clarkson argued a left-wing "coup" had silently taken place in British politics, media and culture, writing "We laugh as they change the name of the Sir Francis Drake Primary School to something less slavey. We think it's all a big joke. But it isn't. Think about what typically happens in a military operation and then look what the woke left has done here." He added: "At least Arthur Scargill had the decency to get on a soapbox and state his aims in public. This lot don't. They sit at home, hiding in the impenetrable shadow of anonymity, inventing new rules to ensnare anyone and everyone they deem to be unworthy."

=== Brexit ===
Clarkson opposed Brexit and supported a Remain vote in the 2016 United Kingdom European Union membership referendum. Three days before the referendum, he and fellow Top Gear presenter James May posted a video stating their support. Clarkson stated that Britain "on its own, has little influence on the world stage"; he also favoured the European Union being turned into a US-like "United States of Europe", with one army, one currency, and one unifying set of values. In 2019, Clarkson said: "Europe has to punish us—they can't allow us to leave without being damaged because then everyone will want to go. We don't want to go if we're going to be damaged." In a January 2019 interview with LBC, Clarkson called Brexit voters "coffin-dodging idiots", though also criticised the younger voters, who overwhelmingly supported Remain, for their voting inactivity.

=== Criticism of Keir Starmer ===
Clarkson was very critical of Keir Starmer and his government following Labour's victory in the 2024 United Kingdom general election. Clarkson attended the England farmers' protests in London, calling tax hikes a "hammer blow to the back of the head" of British agriculture. Clarkson later labelled Starmer "a nightmare for farmers". Starmer is banned from Clarkson's pub, the Farmer's Dog, near Burford; Conservative leader Kemi Badenoch was invited to discuss Starmer's tax and the future of farming. In December 2025, Clarkson said that all Labour MPs were banned from his pub apart from Markus Campbell-Savours.

=== Environment ===
Clarkson is critical of the green movement and environmentalism, including groups such as Greenpeace—he has called them "eco-mentalists" and "old trade unionists and CND lesbians". He also said that, although he "hate[s] the movement, [he] loves the destination" of environmentalism and believes that people should quietly strive to be more eco-friendly. Clarkson has been dismissive of windfarms and renewable energy. and has spoken in support of hydrogen cars.

Clarkson historically rejected the scientific consensus on climate change, believing that anthropogenic greenhouse gas emissions do not affect the global climate. He has also expressed doubt that the effects of climate change are "a bad thing", saying in 2005 "let's just stop and think for a moment what the consequences might be. Switzerland loses its skiing resorts? The beach in Miami is washed away? North Carolina gets knocked over by a hurricane? Anything bothering you yet?" However, during a 2019 trip to Cambodia while filming The Grand Tour, Clarkson acknowledged the "graphic demonstration" of climate change impacts on the Mekong River and Tonlé Sap was "genuinely alarming"; however, he still expressed doubt that it was driven by human activity. Cambodia was undergoing a severe drought during the show's filming. Clarkson is against climate activism, and has often made personal attacks against teenage activist Greta Thunberg, whom he has called "a spoilt brat".

Environmentalists have protested or heckled Clarkson on a number of occasions for his views, including at his honorary degree ceremony at Oxford Brookes University, where a protester threw a banana meringue pie in his face in September 2005, and in 2009 when activist group Climate Rush dumped horse manure on his lawn. Clarkson's comments on Greta Thunberg were criticised by his own daughter.

=== Himself ===
Whilst Clarkson states such views as described above in his columns and in public appearances, his public persona does not necessarily represent his personal views. He acknowledged whilst interviewing Alastair Campbell on Top Gear, saying "I don't believe what I write, any more than you [Campbell] believe what you say".

Clarkson has been described as a "skillful propagandist for the motoring lobby" by The Economist. With a forthright and sometimes deadpan delivery, Clarkson is said to thrive on the notoriety his public comments bring, and has risen to the level of the bête noire of the various groups who disagree with his views. On the Channel 4-organised viewer poll, for the 100 Worst Britons We Love to Hate programme, Clarkson polled in 66th place. By 2005, Clarkson was perceived by the press to have upset so many people and groups, The Independent put him on trial for various "crimes", declaring him guilty on most counts.

=== Media ===
Responses to Clarkson's comments are often directed personally, with derogatory comments about residents of Norfolk leading to some residents organising a "We hate Jeremy Clarkson" club. In The Guardian's 2007 'Media 100' list, which lists the top 100 most "powerful people in the [media] industry", based on cultural, economic and political influence in the UK, Clarkson was listed as a new entrant at 74th. Some critics even attribute Clarkson's actions and views as being influential enough to be responsible for the closure of Rover and the Luton manufacturing plant of Vauxhall. Clarkson's comments about Rover prompted workers to hang an "Anti-Clarkson Campaign" banner outside the defunct Longbridge plant in its last days.

The BBC often played down his comments as ultimately not having the weight they were ascribed. In 2007, they described Clarkson as "not a man given to considered opinion"; in response to an official complaint another BBC spokeswoman once said: "Jeremy's colourful comments are always entertaining, but they are his own comments and not those of the BBC. More often than not they are said with a twinkle in his eye." On his chat show, Clarkson, he caused upset to the Welsh by placing a 3D plastic map of Wales into a microwave oven and switching it on. He later defended this by saying, "I put Wales in there because Scotland wouldn't fit."

=== Recognition ===
In 2005, Clarkson received an honorary Doctor of Engineering degree from Oxford Brookes University. His views on the environment precipitated a small demonstration at the award ceremony for his honorary degree, when Clarkson was pied by road protester Rebecca Lush. Clarkson took this incident in good humour, responding "good shot" and subsequently referring to Lush as "Banana girl".

In 2008, an internet petition was posted on the Prime Minister's Number 10 website to "Make Jeremy Clarkson Prime Minister". By the time it closed, it had attracted 49,446 signatures. An opposing petition posted on the same site set to "Never, Ever Make Jeremy Clarkson Prime Minister" attracted 87 signatures. Clarkson later commented he would be a rubbish Prime Minister as he is always contradicting himself in his columns. In the official response to the petition, Number 10 agreed with Clarkson's comments.

In response to the reactions he gets, Clarkson has stated "I enjoy this back and forth, it makes the world go round but it is just opinion." On the opinion that his views are influential enough to topple car companies, he has argued that he has proof that he has had no influence. "When I said that the Ford Orion was the worst car ever it went on to become a best-selling car." Clarkson was ranked 49th on Motor Trend Magazine's Power List for 2011, its list of the 50 most influential figures in the automotive industry. In 2023 and 2024, he was voted "sexiest man" in the UK.

== Other interests ==
=== Military interests ===
Clarkson has a keen interest in the British Armed Forces. Several of his DVDs and television shows have featured a military theme, such as flying in military jets or several Clarkson-focused Top Gear spots having a military theme such as Clarkson escaping a Challenger 2 tank in a Range Rover, a Lotus Exige evading missile lock from an Apache attack helicopter, a platoon of Irish Guardsmen shooting at a Porsche Boxster and Mercedes-Benz SLK, or using a Ford Fiesta as a Royal Marine landing craft. In October 2005, Clarkson visited British troops in Baghdad.

In 2003, Clarkson presented The Victoria Cross: For Valour, looking at recipients of the Victoria Cross, in particular focusing on his father-in-law, Robert Henry Cain, who received a VC for actions during the Battle of Arnhem in the Second World War. In 2007, Clarkson wrote and presented Jeremy Clarkson: Greatest Raid of All Time, a documentary about Operation Chariot in the Second World War, a 1942 Commando raid on the docks of Saint-Nazaire in occupied France. At the end of 2007, Clarkson became a patron of Help for Heroes, a charity aiming to raise money to provide better facilities to wounded British servicemen. His effort led to the 2007 Christmas appeal in The Sunday Times supporting Help for Heroes.

=== Engineering interests ===
Clarkson is passionate about engineering, especially pioneering work. In Inventions That Changed the World Clarkson showcased the invention of the gun, computer, jet engine, telephone and television. He has previously criticised the engineering feats of the 20th century as merely improvements on the truly innovative inventions of the Industrial Revolution. He cites the lack of any source of alternative power for cars, other than by "small explosions". In Great Britons, as part of a public poll to find the greatest historical Briton, Clarkson was the chief supporter for Isambard Kingdom Brunel, a prominent engineer during the Industrial Revolution credited with numerous innovations. Despite this, he also has a passion for many modern examples of engineering. In Speed and Extreme Machines, Clarkson rides and showcases numerous vehicles and machinery. Clarkson was awarded an honorary degree from Brunel University on 12 September 2003, partly because of his work in popularising engineering, and partly because of his advocacy of Brunel.

In his book I Know You Got Soul, he describes many machines that he believes possess a soul. He cited the Concorde crash as his inspiration, feeling a sadness for the demise of the machine as well as the passengers. Clarkson was a passenger on the last BA Concorde flight, on 24 October 2003. Paraphrasing Neil Armstrong, he described the retirement of the fleet as "This is one small step for a man, but one huge leap backwards for mankind".

He briefly acquired an English Electric Lightning F1A jet fighter XM172 former RAF Coltishall gate guard, which was installed in the front garden of his country home. The Lightning was subsequently removed on the orders of the local council, which "wouldn't believe my claim that it was a leaf blower", according to Clarkson on a Tiscali Motoring webchat. The whole affair was set up for his programme Speed, the Lightning was later returned to Wycombe Air Park.

In a Top Gear episode, Clarkson drove the Bugatti Veyron in a race across Europe against a Cessna 182 piloted by co-presenter James May. The Veyron was an £850,000 technology demonstrator project built by Volkswagen to become the fastest production car, but a practical road car at the same time. In building such an ambitious machine, Clarkson described the project as "a triumph for lunacy over common sense, a triumph for man over nature and a triumph for Volkswagen over absolutely every other car maker in the world." After winning the race, Clarkson announced that "It's quite a hollow victory really, because I've got to go for the rest of my life knowing that I'll never own that car. I'll never experience that power again."

== Vehicles ==
Vehicles Clarkson owns or has owned in the past:

- Range Rover Autobiography V8
- Mercedes-Benz 600 Grosser LWB (featured in Top Gear Series 11 Episode 5, compared against James May's Rolls-Royce Corniche)
- Alfa Romeo Alfetta GTV6 (from The Grand Tour, Series 3 — "Well Aged Scotch")
- Range Rover Vogue SE
- Bentley Flying Spur
- "The Excellent" (Land Rover Discovery and Mercedes SL Combination from the Grand Tour Series 1, Episode 9)
- Lamborghini Trattori R8 270 DCR (a tractor for his farm)
- Deutz-Fahr 9340 Lamborghini edition (tractor bought for £85 000 and sold for £70 000 in season 4 of Clarkson's Farm)
- Lincoln Continental Mark V (from The Grand Tour, Series 4 — "Lochdown")
- Mini
- Jaguar F-Type
- Range Rover P530 Autobiography
- Jaguar F-Type S
- Ford Cortina 1600E
- Volkswagen Scirocco 1
- Volkswagen Scirocco 2
- Honda CR-X
- BMW 3.0L CSL
- BMW Z1
- Ford Escort RS Cosworth
- Ferrari F355 GTS
- Toyota Land Cruiser
- Jaguar XJR
- Mercedes-Benz SL55 AMG
- Volvo XC90
- Lotus Elise 111S
- Ford GT
- Ford Focus
- Mercedes-Benz SLK55 AMG
- Lamborghini Gallardo Spyder
- Aston Martin V8 Vantage
- Mercedes CLK63 AMG Black Series
- Mercedes-Benz CL 600
- Volkswagen Golf GTI
- Modified Bentley Continental GT V8 (from The Grand Tour "A Massive Hunt" in Series 4)
- Jeep Wrangler (from The Grand Tour, Series 3 — "Colombia Special")
- Range Rover TDV8 Vogue SE
- Lancia Montecarlo Spider (from The Grand Tour, Series 6 — "One For The Road")

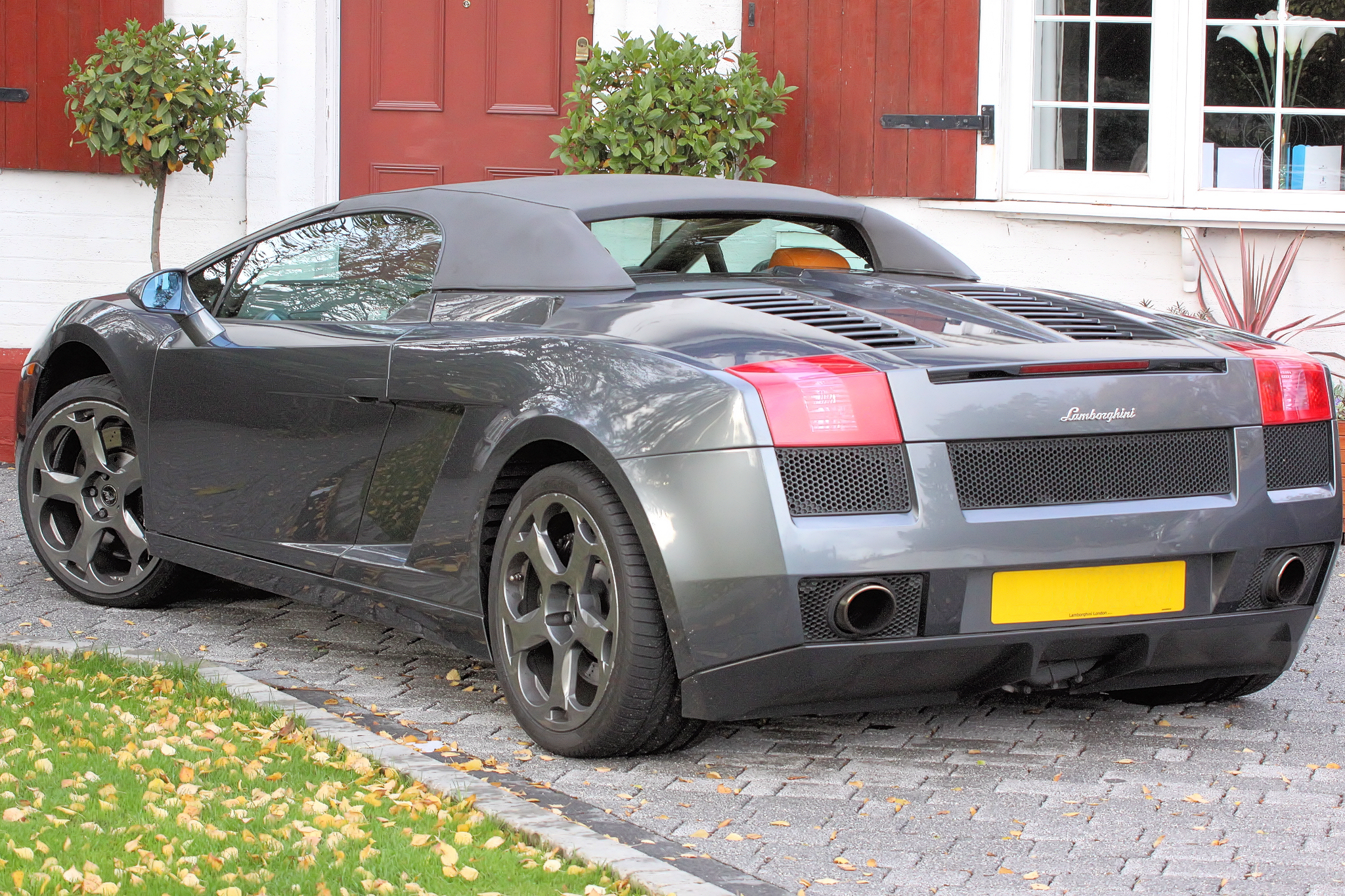
Lamborghini Gallardo Spyder once owned by Clarkson

Clarkson's first car was a 1969 Ford Cortina 1600E that he bought having been inspired by his father's 1600E company car from when he was a child. Having got a job working for his parent's business as a travelling salesman, he would replace it with a Mk1 Volkswagen Scirocco. Throughout his initial career as an automotive journalist and the first half of his career on the original run of Top Gear, some of the cars he owned included a Mk2 Volkswagen Scirocco, a Honda CR-X, an Alfa Romeo GTV6, a BMW 3.0L CSL, and a Ford Escort RS Cosworth.

Clarkson's first high value automotive purchase was a Ferrari F355, having taken a liking to it after testing it for an episode of Top Gear. He owned it throughout the late 1990s where it appeared in many of Clarkson's programs. During the late 1990s, he also owned a Jaguar XJR and a Toyota Land Cruiser. He also bought a BMW Z1 as a present for his then-wife.

Clarkson later sold his Ferrari and replaced it with a Mercedes-Benz SL55 AMG which was famously used on an episode of the rebooted Top Gear. He also bought a Lotus Elise to replace his wife's Z1. He bought a newer Toyota Land Cruiser Amazon around this time to replace his older model.

Clarkson wanted to purchase the Ford GT after driving one for Top Gear and admiring its inspiration, the Ford GT40 race cars of the 1960s. Clarkson was able to secure a place on the shortlist for the few cars that would be imported to Britain to official customers, only through knowing Ford's head of PR through a previous job. After waiting years and facing an increased price, he found many technical problems with the car, particularly due to the aftermarket alarm system that was required to be installed on it for insurance purposes. After "the most miserable month's motoring possible", he returned it to Ford for a full refund. After a short period, including asking Top Gear fans for advice over the Internet, he bought back his GT. He called it "the most unreliable car ever made", because he was never able to complete a return journey with it.

In 2006, Clarkson ordered a Gallardo Spyder and sold the Ford GT to make way for it. In August 2008, he sold the Gallardo, because "idiots in Peugeots kept trying to race [him] in it". In October, he announced that he had sold his Volvo XC90. In January 2009, in a review of the car printed in The Times, he wrote: "I've just bought my third Volvo XC90 in a row and the simple fact is this: It takes six children to school in the morning."

=== Likes ===
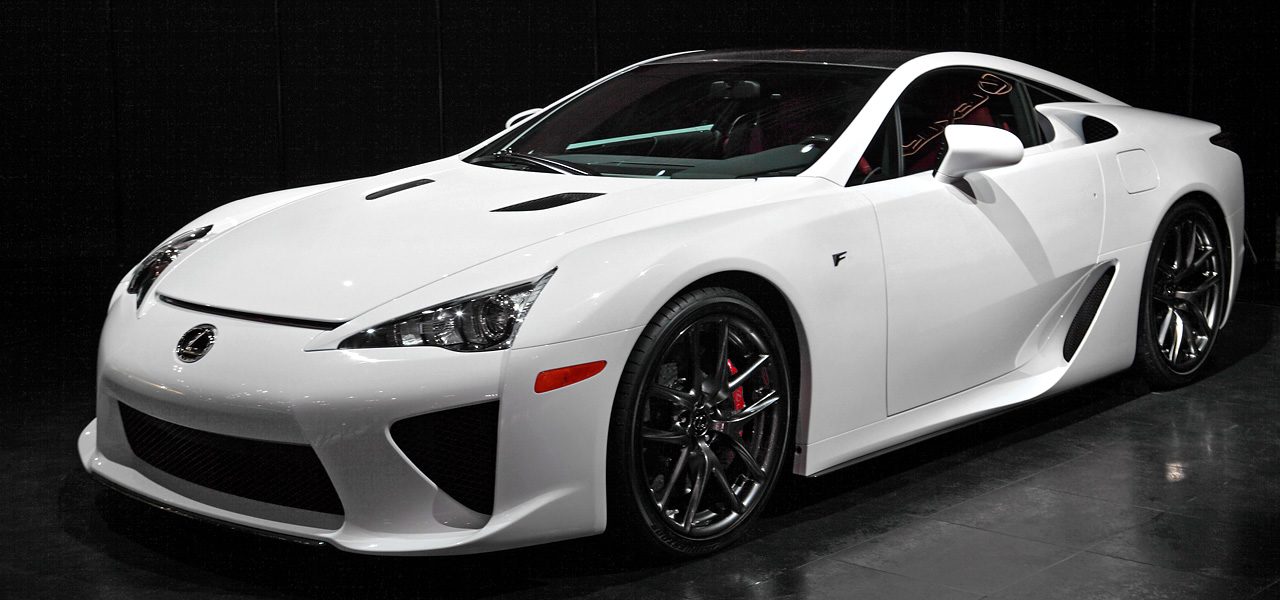
The Lexus LFA, considered by Clarkson to be the best car he has ever driven

You can't be a true petrolhead until you've owned an Alfa Romeo.

— Jeremy Clarkson

Clarkson has spoken highly of the Czech-made Škoda Yeti, calling it possibly the best car in the world; he used 20 minutes of a Top Gear episode putting the Yeti through a number of challenges to support his point. Clarkson called the Alfa Romeo Brera "Cameron Diaz on wheels". Clarkson has expressed fondness for late-model V8 Holdens, available in the UK rebadged as Vauxhalls. Of the Monaro he said, "It's like they had a picture of me on their desk and said [Australian accent] 'Let's build that bloke a car!'" and "I can't believe it... I've fallen in love... with a Vauxhall!" Clarkson suffered two slipped discs that he attributed to driving the Monaro, which he described as being "back-breakingly marvellous". Clarkson considers the Lexus LFA as the best car he has ever driven.

During Top Gear's Patagonia Special, Clarkson said that the Porsche 928 was a car that was close to his heart because he was given the car to test for the series in 1994 and used it unexpectedly to drive from London to Sheffield to visit his dying father in hospital. Clarkson said that had he not driven the Porsche 928 (which was fast enough that a chicken he had cooked was "still warm" by the time he arrived in Sheffield) he "wouldn't have had the opportunity to say goodbye to [his] dad".

=== Dislikes ===
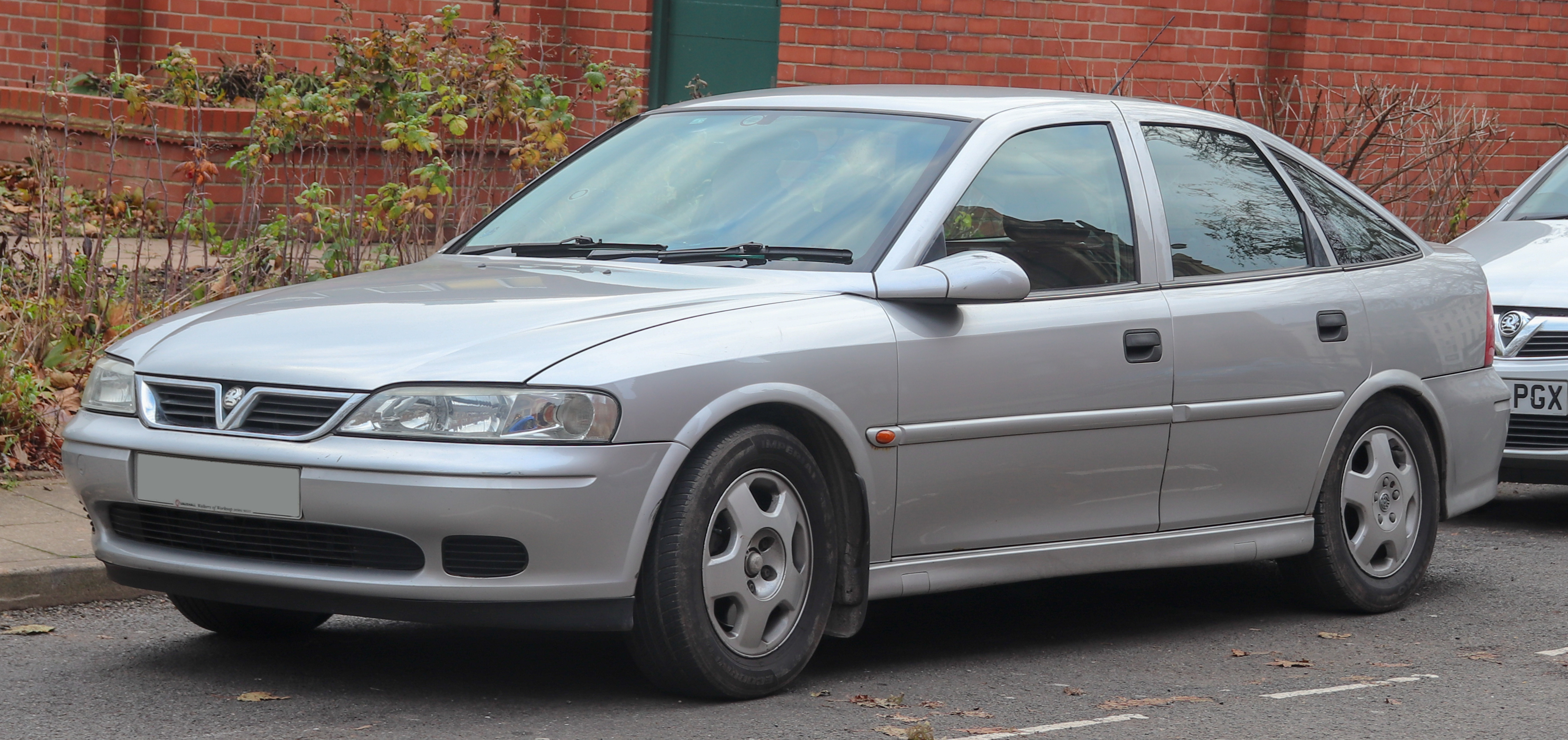
Clarkson expressed hatred towards the Vauxhall Vectra.

Clarkson dislikes the British car brand Rover, the last major British owned and built car manufacturer. This view stretched back to the company's time as part of British Leyland. Describing the history of the company up to its last flagship model, the Rover 75, he paraphrased Winston Churchill and stated "Never in the field of human endeavour has so much been done, so badly, by so many", citing issues with the rack and pinion steering system. In the latter years of the company, Clarkson blamed the "uncool" brand image as being more of a hindrance to sales than any faults with the cars. On its demise in 2005, Clarkson stated "I cannot even get teary and emotional about the demise of the company itself — though I do feel sorry for the workforce." Clarkson has also expressed hatred for the Toyota Prius, Nissan Juke and Citroen 2CV.

Clarkson has also criticised Vauxhalls and has described Vauxhall's former parent company General Motors as a "pensions and healthcare" company which sees the "car making side of the business as an expensive loss-making nuisance". Clarkson has expressed particular disdain for the Vauxhall Vectra, describing it as:

"One of my least favourite cars in the world. I've always hated it because I've always felt it was designed in a coffee break by people who couldn't care less about cars" and "one of the worst chassis I've ever come across."

After a Top Gear piece by Clarkson for its launch in 1995, described by The Independent as "not doing [GM] any favours", Vauxhall complained to the BBC and announced, "We can take criticism but this piece was totally unbalanced."

Clarkson openly states that he dislikes motorcycles. In a 2019 interview about The Grand Tour in Vietnam, Clarkson stated that after being forced to travel across Vietnam on motorcycles, he chose boats for May and Hammond as "payback", knowing they both disliked them.

== Farming ==
Since 2019, he has become a farmer at Diddly Squat Farm for his show, Clarkson's Farm. The show received a positive reception and became a popular show on Prime Video upon its release.

In May 2024, the "Clarkson's clause" amendment, named after him, was introduced; this clause makes it easier to convert unused agricultural buildings to commercial usage, something Clarkson did in season 2 of the show when planning permission for his restaurant was denied. In the fifth series (2026), Clarkson worked with conservationist Hannah Bourne-Taylor, who surveyed the birdlife at Diddly Squat, and he subsequently undertook measures to improve habitats on the farm, including wildflower strips, additional hedgerow and tree planting, and new ponds.

In 2025, Clarkson criticised the Advertising Standards Authority and Clearcast, after an advert for his Hawkstone Lager was censored. The advertisement, which featured a 34-strong choir of British farmers, ended with the farmers chanting "F*** me it’s good" to the tune of Delibes' "Flower Duet", and Clarkson tasking the beer and saying: "Hawkstone. It is f***ing good."

== Controversies ==
=== Activities on Top Gear ===
In 2004, the BBC apologised unreservedly and paid £250 in compensation to a Somerset parish council, after Clarkson damaged a 30-year-old horse-chestnut tree by driving into it to test the strength of a Toyota Hilux. In December 2006, the BBC complaints department upheld the complaint of four Top Gear viewers that Clarkson had used the phrase "ginger beer" (rhyming slang for "queer") in a derogatory manner, when Clarkson picked up on and agreed with an audience member's description of the Daihatsu Copen as being a bit "gay". The Top Gear: Polar Special was criticised by the BBC Trust for glamorising drunk driving in a scene depicting Clarkson and James May consuming alcohol whilst Clarkson says to camera, "And please do not write to us about drinking and driving, because I am not driving, I am sailing," thereby implying that they were driving on frozen international waters. Despite the show's producers claiming that the incident occurred outside the jurisdiction of any drunk-driving laws, the BBC Trust maintained that the scene "was not editorially justified".

In a later incident during a Top Gear episode broadcast on 13 November 2005, Clarkson, while talking about a Mini design that might be "quintessentially German", made a mock Nazi salute, and made references to Nazi Germany and the German invasion of Poland by suggesting the GPS "only goes to Poland". In November 2008, Clarkson attracted over 500 complaints to the BBC when he joked about lorry drivers murdering prostitutes. The BBC stated the comment was a comic rebuttal of a common misconception about lorry drivers and was within the viewer's expectation of Clarkson's Top Gear persona. Chris Mole, the Member of Parliament for Ipswich, where five sex workers were murdered in 2006, wrote a "strongly worded" letter to BBC Director-General Mark Thompson, demanding that Clarkson be sacked. Clarkson dismissed Mole's comments in his Sunday Times column the following weekend, writing, "There are more important things to worry about than what some balding and irrelevant middle-aged man might have said on a crappy BBC2 motoring show." Andrew Tinkler, chief executive of the Eddie Stobart Group, a major trucking company, stated that "They were just having a laugh. It's the 21st century, let's get our sense of humour in line."

In July 2009, Clarkson was reported to have called then British Prime Minister Gordon Brown "a silly cunt" during a warm-up while recording a Top Gear show. Although several newspapers reported that he had subsequently argued with BBC Two controller Janice Hadlow, who was present at the recording, the BBC denied that he had been given a "dressing down". John Whittingdale, Conservative chair of the Culture Select Committee remarked: "Many people will find that offensive, many people will find that word in particular very offensive [...] I am surprised he felt it appropriate to use it."

In July 2010, Clarkson reportedly angered gay rights campaigners after he made a remark on Top Gear that did not get aired on 4 July episode. However, guest Alastair Campbell wrote about it on Twitter. Clarkson said: "I demand the right not to be bummed". The BBC later said that they cut this remark out, as they "edited down" the interview because it was too long to fit into the show. In an episode aired after the watershed on 1 August 2010, Clarkson described a Ferrari F430 as "special needs". He said the car owned by co-presenter James May looked "like a simpleton". Media regulator Ofcom investigated after receiving two complaints, and found that the comments "were capable of causing offence" but did not censure the BBC.

On 12 January 2012, the Indian High Commission lodged a formal complaint with the BBC over the "tasteless" antics of Clarkson's Top Gear Christmas special where he mocked India's culture and people. During the 90-minute special, which was aired twice over the Christmas break, Clarkson made a string of jokes about Indian food, clothes, toilets, trains and history. On an episode of Top Gear broadcast on 5 February 2012, Clarkson compared a Japanese car / camper van to a person with a growth on their face. A major UK charity that supports people with facial disfigurements, Changing Faces, complained to the BBC and Ofcom after Clarkson's remarks.

In an unused take for a Top Gear feature recorded in early 2012, Clarkson is alleged to have mumbled the racial slur "nigger" when repeating the children's rhyme Eeny, meeny, miny, moe. The clip later surfaced on the website of the Daily Mirror tabloid at the beginning of May 2014. In the take, Clarkson attempts to mumble the sentence so as to obscure the word, but admitted that upon a close listening, the word could still be heard. Clarkson apologised for his efforts not being "quite good enough" to ensure the footage was not used. It was reported on 3 May that the BBC had given Clarkson a final warning, with the presenter accepting that he would be sacked if he made another offensive remark.

Near the end of the Top Gear: Burma Special, which aired March 2014, Clarkson and Richard Hammond were seen admiring a wooden bridge, which they had built during the episode. Clarkson is quoted as saying, "That is a proud moment, but there's a slope on it" as a native crosses the bridge, with "slope" being a pejorative for Asians. Top Gear Executive Producer Andy Wilman responded: "When we used the word slope in the recent Top Gear Burma Special it was a light-hearted word play joke referencing both the build quality of the bridge and the local Asian man who was crossing it. We were not aware at the time, and it has subsequently been brought to our attention, that the word slope is considered by some to be offensive."

In October 2014, Clarkson attracted controversy when filming the Top Gear: Patagonia Special after driving a Porsche 928 in Argentina with the registration number H982 FKL, allegedly referring to the 1982 Falklands War. Also, during the broadcast, Clarkson was seen referring to the controversy that had risen after the Burma Special; when inspecting a bridge, which he and his colleagues had built during the episode, he was quoted as saying "That is a proud moment, Hammond, but... is it straight?" With Hammond replying "Yes".

=== Activities outside Top Gear ===
In October 1998, Hyundai complained to the BBC about what they described as "bigoted and racist" comments he made at the Birmingham Motor Show, where he was reported as saying that the people working on the Hyundai stand had "eaten a dog" and that the designer of the Hyundai XG had probably eaten a spaniel for his lunch. Clarkson also allegedly referred to those working on the BMW stand as "Nazis", with BMW saying that they would not lodge a complaint and giving Clarkson "the benefit of the doubt".

In March 2004, at the British Press Awards, he swore at Piers Morgan and punched him before being restrained by security; Morgan says it left him with a scar above his left eyebrow. In April 2007, Clarkson was criticised in the Malaysian parliament for having described one of their cars, the Perodua Kelisa, as the worst in the world, adding that "its name was like a disease and [suggesting] it was built in jungles by people who wear leaves for shoes". A Malaysian government minister countered, pointing out that no complaints had been received from UK customers who had bought the car.

In February 2009, while in Australia, Clarkson made disparaging remarks aimed at the British Prime Minister Gordon Brown, calling him a "one-eyed Scottish idiot", and accused him of lying. These comments were widely condemned by the Royal National Institute of Blind People; they were also condemned by Scottish politicians, who requested that he should be taken off air. He subsequently apologised for referencing Brown's monocular blindness, but said: "I haven't apologised for calling him an idiot."

His column for The Sun newspaper on 4 September 2011 drew angry remarks in response to Clarkson's call to abolish the Welsh language: "I think we are fast approaching the time when the United Nations should start to think seriously about abolishing other languages. What's the point of Welsh, for example? All it does is provide a silly maypole around which a bunch of hotheads can get all nationalistic."

On 30 November 2011, while being interviewed on the BBC's The One Show, Clarkson commented on the UK's public sector strike that day, lauding the capital's empty roads. After mentioning the BBC's need for balance, he said, "I would take them outside and execute them in front of their families." The programme later apologised for his remarks, with further apologies issued by Clarkson and the BBC. These remarks had attracted 21,335 complaints to the BBC within 36 hours; the BBC also received 314 messages of support for Clarkson.

Clarkson was criticised by the mental health charity Mind for his 3 December 2011, column for The Sun, in which he described those who jump in front of trains as "Johnny Suicide" and argues that following a death, trains should carry on their journeys as soon as possible. He adds: "The train cannot be removed nor the line reopened until all of the victim's body has been recovered. And sometimes the head can be half a mile away from the feet." ... "Change the driver, pick up the big bits of what's left of the victim, get the train moving as quickly as possible and let foxy woxy and the birds nibble away at the smaller, gooey parts that are far away or hard to find."

=== Road safety ===
Clarkson often discusses high-speed driving on public roads, criticising road safety campaigns involving cameras and speed bumps. In 2002, a Welsh Assembly Member Alun Pugh wrote to BBC Director-General Greg Dyke to complain about Clarkson's comments that he believed encouraged people to use Welsh roads as a high-speed test track. A BBC spokesman said that suggestions Clarkson had encouraged speeding were "nonsense". Clarkson has also made similar comments about driving in Lincolnshire. In a November 2005 Times article, Clarkson wrote on the Bugatti Veyron, "On a recent drive across Europe I desperately wanted to reach the top speed but I ran out of road when the needle hit 240 mph," and "From the wheel of a Veyron, France is the size of a small coconut. I cannot tell you how fast I crossed it the other day. Because you simply wouldn't believe me."

In 2007, solicitor Nick Freeman represented Clarkson against a charge of driving at 86 mph in a 50 mph zone on the A40 road in London, defeating it on the basis that the driver of the car loaned to Clarkson from Alfa Romeo could not be ascertained. In 2008, Clarkson claimed in a talk at the Hay Festival to have been given a speeding ticket for driving at 186 mph on the A1203 Limehouse Link road in London.

=== Dismissal from Top Gear ===
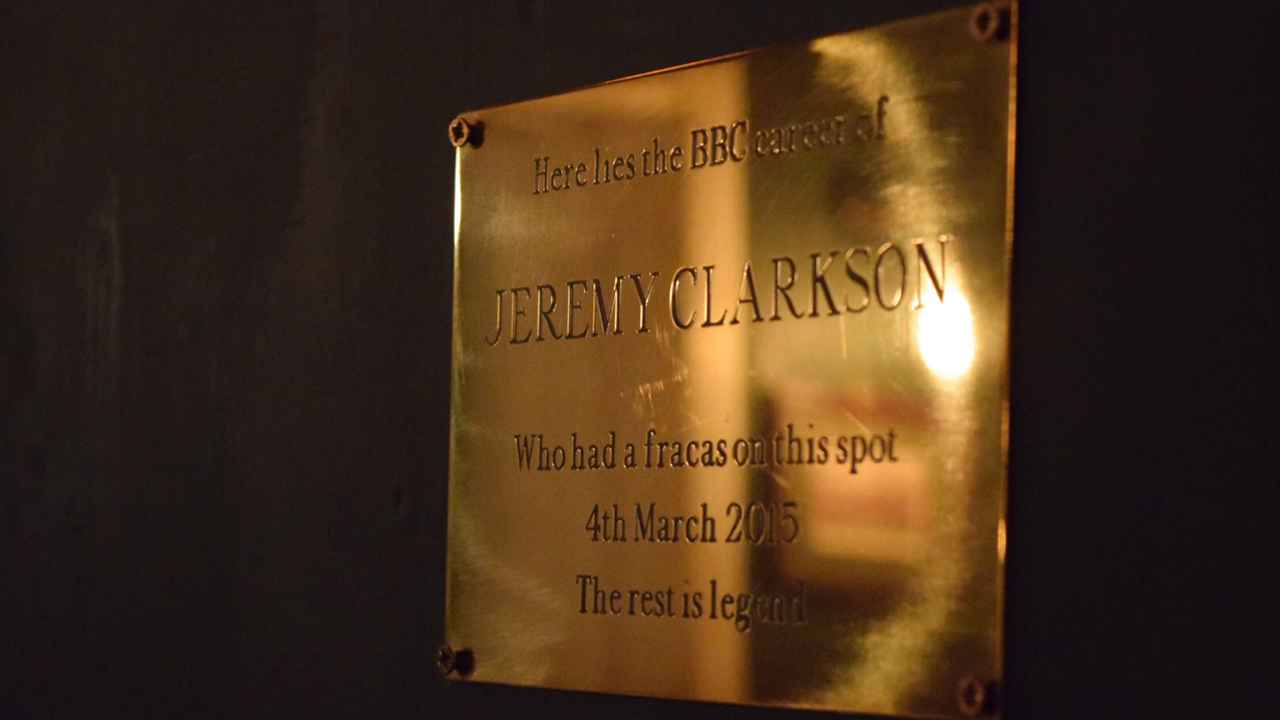
A satirical plaque referencing Clarkson at the Simonstone Hall Hotel in Yorkshire, where the incident took place

In March 2015, Clarkson was suspended by the BBC from Top Gear following a "fracas" with one of the show's producers, Oisin Tymon. It emerged that Clarkson had been involved in a dispute over catering while filming on location in Hawes, North Yorkshire, having been refused a steak (the chef had gone home) and offered soup and cold meat instead.

The BBC announced that the next episode of the show would not be broadcast on 15 March. It was later announced through the BBC's website that the network would be likely to drop the remaining two episodes of the series as well in the wake of the incident, which involved Clarkson punching producer Oisin Tymon, who was later treated in hospital. Tymon also said that Clarkson had called him a "lazy Irish cunt". Clarkson's contract with the BBC expired at the end of March, and a previously proposed three-year renewal was withdrawn.

A Change.org petition, aiming to reverse the BBC decision, was started on 10 March by blogger Guido Fawkes. The petition reached its target 1,000,000 signatures by the afternoon of 20 March, and was delivered to the BBC in an artillery vehicle by a man dressed as Top Gear test driver The Stig, with Fawkes as spokesman. The hosting website described the petition as the fastest-growing campaign in its history. On 19 March 2015, at a charity auction at the Roundhouse in Camden, north London, Clarkson launched into a verbal tirade against BBC studio bosses related to his suspension from the programme, saying "The BBC have fucked themselves." He later stated that this was "meant in jest".

On 25 March 2015, the BBC released an official statement confirming that, as a result of the actions which led to his suspension, they would not be renewing his contract with the show. Following the statement, North Yorkshire Police requested to view the report and stated that "action will be taken by North Yorkshire police where necessary". However, Tymon informed the police that he did not wish to press charges against Clarkson, and Clarkson urged fans of the show to stop trolling Tymon on social media, as what happened was not his fault. British police investigated death threats made against BBC Director-General Tony Hall over Clarkson's firing. Less than 24 hours after his dismissal, Clarkson was approached by Zvezda, a Russian state broadcaster, to present a motoring programme.

In his Sunday Times column on 19 April, Clarkson said that two days before he hit Tymon, he had been told by his doctor that a lump he had could be cancer of the tongue. Testing later confirmed that it was not cancerous. In the same column, he stated that he had initially considered retiring from television following his dismissal, but was now planning a new motoring programme. In November 2015, Tymon sued Clarkson and the BBC for racial discrimination over the verbal abuse he received in the March incident. The following February, Clarkson formally apologised to Tymon and settled the racial discrimination and personal injury claim for £100,000.

=== The Sun newspaper column on the Duchess of Sussex ===
In December 2022, Clarkson was criticised for one of his columns in The Sun on Meghan, Duchess of Sussex, which was deemed misogynistic by critics. He stated:

I hate her. Not like I hate Nicola Sturgeon or Rose West. I hate her on a cellular level. At night, I'm unable to sleep as I lie there, grinding my teeth and dreaming of the day when she is made to parade naked through the streets of every town in Britain while the crowds chant, 'Shame!' and throw lumps of excrement at her.

He later said it was a reference to a scene from the television series Game of Thrones. He had used the same reference in an article published in The Sun in December 2018 to defend Meghan:

When Meghan Markle swapped being an actress for being a duchess, she was hailed as a breath of fresh air for the Royal Family — so why is she now being pilloried?... But then, after about seven minutes, everyone suddenly decided she's actually a witch. At this rate, it won't be long before she is stripped and forced to walk naked through the streets of York while people with skin diseases chant "Shame!" and throw excrement at her. I can't understand why this is happening. You don't know her. I don't know her. So why have we all suddenly decided she should be mocked and pilloried for every little thing she ever does?"

In his other columns, Clarkson criticised Meghan for her "simpering victimhood", called her a "silly little cable TV actress", and stated that her climate change pleas make him want to "shoot a polar bear in the middle of its face." The Independent Press Standards Organisation (IPSO) said it had received more than 25,100 complaints about the piece, making it the article with the most number of complaints attached to it since IPSO's establishment in 2014. The number is also more than the total number of complaints made to IPSO in 2021, which was 14,355.

On 19 December 2022, The Sun's website published a statement in response to the criticism: "In light of Jeremy Clarkson's tweet he has asked us to take last week's column down." In light of the controversy, Edward Faulks, the chair of IPSO, declined a private dinner invitation by Rupert Murdoch, who owns The Sun. The Scottish first minister, Nicola Sturgeon, whose name was also mentioned in the column, described Clarkson's comments as "deeply misogynist and just downright awful and horrible" and warned that "words have consequences". The prime minister, Rishi Sunak, responded to the controversy by emphasising that "language matters". In a letter to ITV chief executive Carolyn McCall, SNP MP John Nicolson called on the organisation to sack Clarkson.

On 20 December 2022, Conservative MP Caroline Nokes wrote to The Sun's editor, Victoria Newton, calling for "action [to be] taken" against Clarkson and for an "unreserved apology". The letter was signed by more than 60 cross-party MPs. On 21 December, Kevin Lygo, the managing director of ITV, stated at a Broadcasting Press Guild event that Clarkson would remain host of Who Wants to Be a Millionaire? "at the moment" as ITV had "no control" over what he said in The Sun newspaper column, but added that what he wrote "was awful" and "he should apologise" for his comments. On the same day the head of the Metropolitan Police Sir Mark Rowley stated Clarkson would not face criminal proceedings for his actions as it was not the job of officers to "police people's ethics" and the police could generally get involved when "things are said that are intended or likely to stir up or incite violence".

Peter Herbert, the chair of the Society of Black Lawyers, wrote to the Metropolitan Police requesting an investigation under the Public Order Act 1986 as he believed the column promoted racial hatred. The letter was co-signed by the Society of Black Lawyers, Operation Black Vote and Bandung Africa, as well as Lee Jasper, Viv Ahmun, Bell Ribeiro-Addy, and Claudia Webbe. A spokesperson for the Metropolitan Police said "The allegations have been assessed, no offences have been identified, and no further action will be taken." On 11 January 2023, culture secretary Michelle Donelan described Clarkson's comments as "outrageous" but not "illegal" and said that she "wouldn't have said what he said and I don't align myself with the comments that he made" but "I defend his right to be able to say what he wants" because "that's the nature of free speech—of course, that shouldn't stray into illegal content or go in certain directions."

On 19 December, Clarkson stated he was "horrified to have caused so much hurt" over his comments, which were also criticised by his daughter Emily and co-star James May. On 23 December, The Sun issued an apology, stating "columnists' opinions are their own" but they "regret the publication of this article" and are "sincerely sorry". On the following day, a spokesperson for the Duke and Duchess of Sussex described the apology as "nothing more than a PR stunt" and added that the publication had not contacted Meghan to personally apologise which "shows their intent". In an Instagram post on 16 January 2023, Clarkson said that he had emailed the Duke and Duchess on Christmas Day 2022 to apologise, saying that his language had been "disgraceful" and he was "profoundly sorry". A spokesperson for the couple said Clarkson wrote solely to the Duke and the article was not an isolated incident considering "his long-standing pattern of writing articles that spread hate rhetoric, dangerous conspiracy theories and misogyny."

In the fallout from the comments, Variety reported that Amazon was likely ending its relationship with Clarkson; however, this report proved to be inaccuarate, as Clarkson's Farm was later renewed for a fourth season to be broadcast in 2025. In February 2023, IPSO announced that it was launching an investigation about the article, specifically taking forward two groups of complaints, from the Fawcett Society and the Wilde Foundation, which claimed "they were affected by breaches in accuracy, harassment and discrimination." In June 2023, IPSO concluded that the column was sexist and contained a "pejorative and prejudicial reference" to Meghan's sex, but it rejected complaints that the piece was inaccurate, meant to harass her or included discriminatory references on the grounds of race.

== Personal life ==
Clarkson married Alex Hall in 1989; however, she left him for one of his friends after six months. In May 1993, he married his manager, Frances Cain, daughter of VC recipient Robert Henry Cain, in Fulham. The couple had three children. Known for buying him car-related gifts, for Christmas 2007, Clarkson's second wife bought him a Mercedes-Benz 600. Clarkson and Cain divorced in 2014.

While reviewing the TVR Sagaris in July 2005 for Top Gear at the test track, Clarkson slipped two discs in his back due to him excessively oversteering; he was forced to stop driving for six months. Clarkson was involved in a protracted legal dispute about access to a "permissive path" across the grounds of his second home, a converted lighthouse, on the Isle of Man between 2005 and 2010, after reports that dogs had attacked and killed sheep on the property. Clarkson and his wife had claimed that four sheep were deliberately killed after being chased into the sea by a dog let off its lead. He lost the dispute after the Isle of Man government held a public inquiry, and he was told to re-open the footpath. The decision was affirmed by the Isle of Man High Court.

Clarkson is a fan of the band Genesis and attended their reunion concert at Twickenham Stadium in 2007. He also provided sleeve notes for the reissue of the album Selling England by the Pound as part of the Genesis 1970–1975 box set. He and his son are fans of the football team Chelsea FC. In September 2010, Clarkson was granted a privacy injunction against his first wife to prevent her from publishing claims that their sexual relationship continued after his second marriage (see AMM v HXW). He voluntarily lifted the injunction in October 2011, commenting that: "Injunctions don't work. You take out an injunction against somebody or some organisation and immediately news of that injunction and the people involved and the story behind the injunction is in a legal-free world on Twitter and the Internet. It's pointless."

Since 2017, Clarkson has been in a relationship with Irish-born former actress and screenplay writer Lisa Hogan, who features in his Amazon Prime series Clarkson's Farm. He lives in Chadlington, near Chipping Norton, Oxfordshire, and has been described as a member of the Chipping Norton set.

For his 60th birthday in 2020, Clarkson purchased a Bentley Flying Spur as a present to himself.

On 23 August 2024, Clarkson opened a pub, the Farmer's Dog, formerly known as the Windmill, in Asthall, near Burford, in connection with his farming show Clarkson's Farm. In August 2024, Clarkson said he banned Prime Minister Keir Starmer, his Top Gear and The Grand Tour colleague James May, and a local named Maddy Hornby. In December 2025, Clarkson additionally stated that all Labour MPs were banned from his pub apart from Markus Campbell-Savours.

=== Health ===
On 4 August 2017, Clarkson was admitted to hospital after falling ill with pneumonia while on a family holiday in Mallorca, Spain, and was being treated in a hospital there. He subsequently said he could "breathe out harder and for longer than a non-smoking 40-year-old" and had 96 per cent capacity for a person his age. "In short, getting on for three-quarters of a million fags have not harmed me in any way. I have quite literally defied medical science".

On 19 October 2024, Clarkson revealed via his column in The Sunday Times that he had a stent fitted at John Radcliffe Hospital in Oxford after experiencing a "sudden deterioration" in his health after returning from holiday in the Indian Ocean.

In June 2026, Clarkson disclosed in an episode of Clarkson's Farm that he had been diagnosed with an aggressive form of prostate cancer in May 2025, but that the disease had been detected early. A few days later, he announced on Instagram that he was in remission.

== Filmography ==
=== Television ===
Year	Title	Role	Notes
1988–2000	Top Gear	Presenter	
1995	Jeremy Clarkson's Motorsport Mayhem	Presenter	VHS/DVD exclusive
1995–1996	Jeremy Clarkson's Motorworld	Presenter	13 episodes
1996	More Motorsport Mayhem	Presenter	VHS exclusive
1996	Jeremy Clarkson: Unleashed on Cars	Presenter	VHS exclusive
1997	Apocalypse Clarkson	Presenter	VHS exclusive
1998	Jeremy Clarkson's Extreme Machines	Presenter	1 series (6 episodes)
1998	Robot Wars	Presenter	1 series (6 episodes)
1998	The Most Outrageous Jeremy Clarkson Video in the World...Ever!	Presenter	VHS exclusive
1998–2000	Clarkson	Presenter	3 series (27 episodes)
1999	Jeremy Clarkson: Head to Head	Presenter	VHS/DVD exclusive
2000	Clarkson's Car Years	Presenter	1 series (6 episodes)
2000	Jeremy Clarkson: At Full Throttle	Presenter	VHS/DVD exclusive
2001	Speed	Presenter	1 series (6 episodes)
2001	Clarkson's Top 100 Cars	Presenter	VHS/DVD exclusive
2002	Jeremy Clarkson: Meets the Neighbours	Presenter	5 episodes
2002	100 Greatest Britons	Presenter	One-off (presented 1 of 12 episodes)
2002	Clarkson: No Limits	Presenter	VHS/DVD exclusive
2002–2015	Have I Got News for You	Presenter	13 episodes
2002–2015, 2021	Top Gear	Presenter	22 series (175 episodes + 11 specials); Reappeared in a one-off special to look back at the Life of Sabine Schmitz in 2021
2003	Grumpy Old Men	Participant	
2003	The Victoria Cross: For Valour	Presenter	One–off
2003	Clarkson: Shoot Out	Presenter	VHS/DVD exclusive
2004	Inventions That Changed the World	Presenter	1 series (5 episodes)
2004	Clarkson: Hot Metal	Presenter	VHS/DVD exclusive
2004	Who Do You Think You Are?	Participant	Series 1, Episode 4 (2 November 2004)
2004–2016	QI	Participant	14 episodes
2005	Stars in Fast Cars	Participant	Pilot episode
2005	Clarkson: Heaven and Hell	Presenter	DVD exclusive
2005	Top of the Pops	Presenter	1 episode
2006	Never Mind the Buzzcocks	Presenter	Guest host – 1 episode
2006	Clarkson: The Good, The Bad, The Ugly	Presenter	DVD exclusive
2007	Jeremy Clarkson: The Greatest Raid of All Time	Presenter	One–off
2007	Clarkson: Supercar Showdown	Presenter	DVD exclusive
2008	Clarkson: Thriller	Presenter	DVD exclusive
2009	Clarkson: Duel	Presenter	DVD exclusive
2010	Clarkson: The Italian Job	Presenter	DVD exclusive
2011	Clarkson: Powered Up	Presenter	DVD exclusive
2014	Phineas and Ferb	Adrian (Voice)	Appeared with his fellow Top Gear presenters
2014	PQ17: An Arctic Convoy Disaster	Presenter	
2015	TFI Friday	Participant	
2016–2024	The Grand Tour	Presenter	6 series (46 episodes); The show's studio format was discontinued after series 3. Series 4–6 (2019–24) are composed solely of feature-length road trip specials.
2018–present	Who Wants to Be a Millionaire?	Presenter	9 series (85 episodes)
2020–2021	It's Clarkson on TV	Presenter	5 episodes
2021–present	Clarkson's Farm	Presenter	5 series (40 episodes)
2026–present	Millionaire Hot Seat	Presenter	Who Wants to Be a Millionaire? spin-off; 1 series (20 episodes)
2026	The Grand-ish Tour	Presenter	Retrospective series on the Grand Tour (3 episodes)
2026	The Grand Tour	Guest	Reboot Series

=== Film ===
Year	Title	Role	Notes
2006	Cars	Harv (Voice)	UK version only

=== Video games ===
Year	Title	Role
2011	Forza Motorsport 4	Presenter
2013	Forza Motorsport 5	Presenter
2019	The Grand Tour Game	Presenter

=== Music video appearances ===
Year	Song	Role	Notes	Ref
1993	"Mr Blobby"	Chauffeur	1993 Christmas No.1	

== Bibliography ==
Book	Publisher	Year
Jeremy Clarkson's Motorworld	BBC Books; Penguin Books	1996; Reprinted 2004
Clarkson on Cars	Virgin Books; Penguin Books	1996; Reprinted 2004
Clarkson's Hot 100	Virgin Books; Carlton Books	1997; Reprinted 1998
Planet Dagenham	Andre Deutsch; Carlton Books	1998; Reprinted 2006
Born to be Riled	BBC Books; Penguin Books	1999; Reprinted 2007
Jeremy Clarkson on Ferrari	Lancaster Books; Salamander Books	2000; Reprinted 2001
The World According to Clarkson	Icon Books; Penguin Books	2004; Reprinted 2005
I Know You Got Soul	Michael Joseph; Penguin Books	2005; Reprinted 2006
And Another Thing...: The World According To Clarkson Volume 2	Michael Joseph; Penguin Books	2006; Reprinted 2007
Don't Stop Me Now!!	Michael Joseph; Penguin Books	2007; Reprinted 2008
For Crying Out Loud!: The World According To Clarkson Volume 3	Michael Joseph; Penguin Books	2008; Reprinted 2009
Driven to Distraction	Michael Joseph; Penguin Books	2009; Reprinted 2010
How Hard Can It Be?: The World According To Clarkson Volume 4	Michael Joseph; Penguin Books	2010; Reprinted 2011
Round The Bend	Michael Joseph; Penguin Books	2011; Reprinted 2012
The Top Gear Years	Penguin Books	2012; Reprinted 2013
Is It Really Too Much To Ask?: The World According To Clarkson Volume 5	Penguin Books	2013; Reprinted 2014
What Could Possibly Go Wrong...	Penguin Books	2014; Reprinted 2015
As I was saying...: The World According To Clarkson Volume 6	Penguin Books	24 September 2015
If You'd Just Let Me Finish: The World According To Clarkson Volume 7	Penguin Books	October 2018
Really?	Penguin Books	October 2019
Can You Make This Thing Go Faster?: The World According To Clarkson Volume 8	Penguin Books	October 2020
Diddly Squat: A Year on the Farm	Penguin Books	November 2021
Diddly Squat: 'Til The Cows Come Home	Penguin Books	September 2022
Diddly Squat: Pigs Might Fly	Penguin Books	October 2023
Diddly Squat: Home to Roost	Penguin Books	October 2024
Diddly Squat: The Farmer's Dog	Penguin Books	October 2025

- Two books containing the best columns from previous publications, titled The Collected Thoughts of Clarkson and Never Played Golf, were issued by Top Gear magazine, in 2003 and 2004 respectively.

== Britcar 24 Hour results ==
Year	Team	Co-drivers	Car	Car no.	Class	Laps	Pos.	Class pos.	Ref.
2007	(United Kingdom) Team Top Gear	(United Kingdom) "The Stig" (United Kingdom) James May (United Kingdom) Richard Hammond	BMW 330d	78	4	396	39th	3rd	
