= Jeremy Clarkson's Motorworld =

BBC television series

- Presented by: Jeremy Clarkson
- Country of origin: United Kingdom
- Original language: English
- No. of seasons: 2
- No. of episodes: 13

Production
- Producer: Dennis Jarvis
- Production location: BBC Pebble Mill
- Running time: 30 minutes
- Production company: BBC Birmingham

Original release
- Network: BBC Two
- Release: 5 January 1995 – 26 December 1996

Motorworld (book)
- Author: Jeremy Clarkson
- Language: English
- Genre: Factual
- Publisher: Penguin
- Publication date: 1996 (BBC Books); 2004 (Penguin)
- Publication place: United Kingdom
- Media type: Paperback
- Pages: 208
- ISBN: 0-14-101787-2
- OCLC: 56439618

Jeremy Clarkson's Motorworld is a BBC television series about the car and motoring cultures of various countries. The show was presented by Jeremy Clarkson and consisted of two series of six episodes each plus a special focusing on the UK. Each episode focused on a different country or region. The series was first shown in the UK on BBC Two in 1995, and was subsequently shown to an international audience on BBC World. It has also been repeated on Dave. The Best Of Jeremy Clarkson's Motorworld, a video containing 70 minutes of highlights from the series was released on 7 October 1996. The video was later released on DVD as part of The Jeremy Clarkson Collection in 2007. There was also a book written by Clarkson based on the series. Clarkson described the series as: "From the sports cars of the wealthy in Monaco to the 1950s Morris Oxfords that still rule the roads in India, this is a lighthearted look at the culture of the car in 12 countries. His travels include visits to Italy, home of the Ferrari – "a steel deity, sex on wheels"; Japan, where he has a brush with the local Mercedes-driving mafia; and Iceland, where he takes his life in his hands and hurtles around the most dangerous off-the-road course in the world in a customized 4WD jeep.

== Episode list ==
#	Episode	Airdate	Production code
Series 1, Episode 1	Japan	5 January 1995	NBMW545B
Series 1, Episode 2	Vietnam	12 January 1995	NBMW550X
Series 1, Episode 3	Detroit	19 January 1995	NBMW549D
Series 1, Episode 4	Iceland	26 January 1995	NBMW547P
Series 1, Episode 5	Italy	2 February 1995	NBMW546W
Series 1, Episode 6	India	9 February 1995	NBMW548J
Series 2, Episode 1	Monaco	4 January 1996	NBMX433A
Series 2, Episode 2	Cuba	11 January 1996	NBMX435N
Series 2, Episode 3	Switzerland	18 January 1996	NBMX432F
Series 2, Episode 4	Australia	25 January 1996	NBMX436H
Series 2, Episode 5	Texas	1 February 1996	NBMX434T
Series 2, Episode 6	Dubai	8 February 1996	NBMX437B
Series 2, Episode 7	United Kingdom	26 December 1996	NBHA575P
