= Alfred Rawlinson =

Alfred Rawlinson may refer to:

- Sir Alfred Rawlinson, 3rd Baronet (1867–1934), British pioneer motorist and aviator, soldier and intelligence officer
- Alfred Rawlinson (bishop) (1884–1960), Bishop of Derby, 1935–1959
- Sir Alfred Frederick Rawlinson, 4th Baronet (1900–1969) of the Rawlinson baronets
