= George Rawlinson =

British historian and clergyman (1812–1902)

The Reverend Canon Professor George Rawlinson
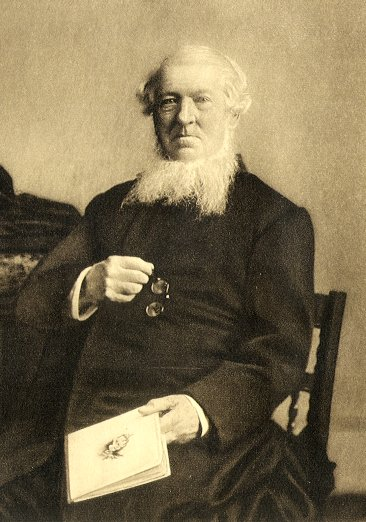
- Rawlinson c. 1899

Camden Professor of Ancient History University of Oxford
- In office 1861–1889
- Preceded by: Edward Cardwell
- Succeeded by: Henry Francis Pelham

Personal details
- Born: 23 November 1812 Chadlington, England, British Empire
- Died: 6 October 1902 (aged 89) Canterbury, England, British Empire
- Children: 8 daughters and 4 sons

George Rawlinson (23 November 1812 – 6 October 1902) was a British scholar, historian and Christian theologian.

== Life ==
Rawlinson was born at Chadlington, Oxfordshire, the son of Abraham Tysack Rawlinson and the younger brother of the famous Assyriologist, Sir Henry Rawlinson. His father was a breeder of racehorses, and bred the winner of the 1841 Derby. Rawlinson was educated at Ealing School. Having taken a First in Literae Humaniores at the University of Oxford (from Trinity College) in 1838, he was elected to a fellowship at Exeter College in 1840, where he was a Fellow and tutor from 1842 to 1846. He was ordained in 1841, was curate at Merton, Oxfordshire from 1846 to 1847, was Bampton Lecturer in 1859, and was Camden Professor of Ancient History from 1861 to 1889.

In his early days at Oxford, Rawlinson played cricket for the University, appearing in five matches between 1836 and 1839.

He was elected as a member of the American Philosophical Society in 1869.

In 1872, he was appointed canon of Canterbury, and after 1888 he was rector of the rich City of London benefice All Hallows, Lombard Street. In 1873, he was appointed proctor in Convocation for the Chapter of Canterbury.

In 1846, he married Louisa Chermside, daughter of Sir Robert Alexander Chermside. The couple had twelve children and celebrated their golden wedding anniversary in 1896.

After two years of failing health, Canon Rawlinson died at his residence in Cathedral precincts, Canterbury, on 6 October 1902 from a sudden syncope.

== Family ==
- Abraham Tysack Rawlinson (Father)
- Eliza Eudocia Albinia (Mother)
- Sir Henry Creswicke Rawlinson, 1st Baronet (Older brother)
- Henry Seymour Rawlinson, 1st Baron Rawlinson (Nephew)
- Sir Alfred Rawlinson, 3rd Baronet (Nephew)
- Henry Creswicke (Maternal grandfather)
- Abraham Rawlinson (Paternal great uncle)
- George Ernest Rawlinson (Son)
- Alice Georgiana Rawlinson (Daughter)
- Merial Eudocia Rawlinson (Daughter)
- Mary Louisa Rawlinson (Daughter)
- Marguerite Jane Rawlinson (Daughter)
- Eleanor Katherine Rawlinson (Daughter)
- Ethel Elisabeth Amy Rawlinson (Daughter)
- Edward Creswicke Scott Rawlinson (Son)
- Sister Louisa Henrietta Rawlinson (Daughter)
- Edith Gertrude Rawlinson (Daughter)
- Lionel Seymour Rawlinson (Son)
- Charles Brooke Rawlinson (Son)

== Publications ==
One of his earliest works is his English translation of The Histories of Herodotus, 1858–60, complete with short notes and other scholarly additions. It also includes contributions of special articles about history, archaeology, and race from his brother Sir Henry Rawlinson and Sir John Gardner Wilkinson. Formidably titled "The History of Herodotus. A new English version, edited with copious notes and appendices. Embodying the chief results, historical and ethnographical, which have been obtained in the progress of Cuneiform and Hieroglyphical discovery," it became the leading edition of The Histories at Oxford for many years.

His other chief publications include:

- The Five Great Monarchies of the Ancient Eastern World, 1862–67
- The Sixth Great Oriental Monarchy (Parthian), 1873
- The Seventh Great Oriental Monarchy (Sassanian), 1875
- Manual of Ancient History, 1869
- Historical Illustrations of the Old Testament, 1871
- The Origin of Nations, 1877
- History of Ancient Egypt, 1881
- Egypt and Babylon, 1885
- History of Phoenicia, 1889
- Parthia, 1893
- Memoir of Major-General Sir HC Rawlinson, 1898

His lectures to an audience at Oxford University on the topic of the accuracy of the Bible in 1859 were published in later years as the apologetic work The Historical Evidences of the Truth of the Scripture Records Stated Anew.

He was also a contributor to the Speaker's Commentary, the Pulpit Commentary, Smith's Dictionary of the Bible, and various similar publications. He was the author of the article "Herodotus" in the 9th edition of the Encyclopædia Britannica.

In his 1881 book, a History of Ancient Egypt, George Rawlinson wrote that in form the Egyptian most resembled the modern Arab. They were amongst the darkest of races that the Greeks came into contact with, but Herodotus made some extreme exaggerations. Based on his viewing of monuments, he asserted the real complexion of the ordinary Egyptian man was brown-with a tinge of red, which he observed was not very different from the Copts. In another publication entitled Ancient Egypt released in 1887, Rawlinson would state the Egyptian people were of a "mixed-race", derived by movements of Ethiopians from the south, Libyans from the west, and Semitic peoples coming from the north-east of the continent.
