= Chadlington =

Village and civil parish in England

Coordinates: 51.898°N 1.524°W

Chadlington: Chad
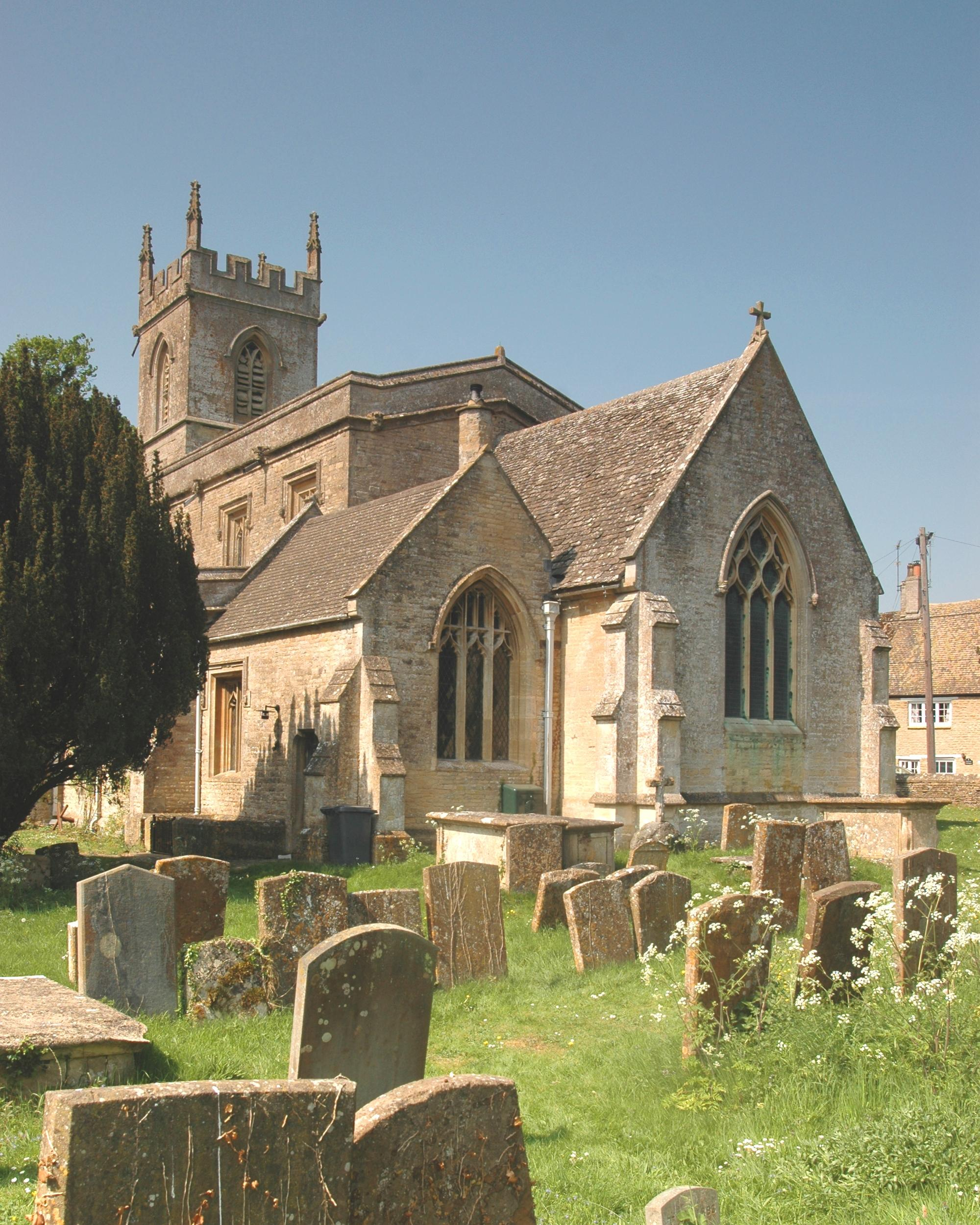
- St. Nicholas' parish church

- Location within Oxfordshire
- Population: 827 (2011 Census)
- OS grid reference: SP3321
- Civil parish: Chadlington
- District: West Oxfordshire
- Shire county: Oxfordshire
- Region: South East
- Country: England
- Sovereign state: United Kingdom
- Post town: Chipping Norton
- Postcode district: OX7
- Dialling code: 01608
- Police: Thames Valley
- Fire: Oxfordshire
- Ambulance: South Central
- UK Parliament: Banbury

Chadlington is a village and civil parish in the Evenlode Valley about 3 miles (5 km) south of Chipping Norton, Oxfordshire. The village has five neighbourhoods: Brook End, Green End, Mill End, East End and West End.

== Archaeology ==
There is a bowl barrow about 1.5 miles (2.4 km) west of the village. Bowl barrows range from late Neolithic to late Bronze Age, i.e. 2400 to 1500 BC. The barrow is a scheduled monument. Knollbury is a hill-fort 1 mile (1.6 km) northwest of the village. It is a scheduled monument.

== Manors ==
Chadlington appears to have been at the head of its own hundred both before and after the Norman Conquest, but later on, together with two other hundreds, it became amalgamated into the single Hundred of Shipton. Throughout Oxfordshire there is, however, little evidence for hundredal boundaries prior to the post-Conquest amalgamations. Two separate estates at Chadlington existed by the time of Domesday Book in 1086, each of two and a half hides; and this looks like a 'classic' case of an original five hide estate becoming split in two before the Norman Conquest. The form of settlement in Chadlington in the late 11th century is entirely unknown, but it is likely that one of the manors was centred on the church, and was located where the surviving manor house is now, immediately to the south of the church. The present Chadlington Manor House is said to be of 17th century date, remodelled in about 1800. However, it is extremely likely that its site is far older, and by the late Anglo-Saxon period, may have been occupied by a modest timber thegn's hall. The very close proximity between the manor house site and the church suggests a classic 'manorial' relationship, so that the church is very likely to have been a proprietorial foundation. It is a Grade II* listed building. Lower Court farmhouse was built in about 1700 as the manor house for Westend. It was altered in the mid- to late-18th century and remodelled in the 19th. The house has a Stonesfield Slate roof. It is a Grade II* listed building.

== Etymology ==
The widespread local tradition that Chadlington takes its name directly from St Chad is entirely false. In fact, the first element is probably from another Old English personal name, Ceadela, of which other toponymic examples exist but it is not as yet attested outside place-names. The full meaning of the name is probably most appropriately given simply as 'the estate/settlement/farmstead associated with Ceadela'.

== Churches and chapel ==
=== Church of England ===
The Church of England parish church of Saint Nicholas was originally Norman, and the blocked head of a Norman window above the north arcade show that the building had a clerestory in Norman times. It is extremely likely, however, that a church, probably of timber, stood on the site by the late Anglo-Saxon period at the latest. The church's orientation, which is almost south-west/north-east, is somewhat idiosyncratic, and might suggest that it was inserted into the framework of a pre-existing settlement plan. In the 13th century, Early English Gothic north and south aisles were added, with four-bay arcades linking the aisles with the nave. Both aisles still retain some lancet windows from this period. The bell tower was built early in the 14th century in the Decorated Gothic style. A chapel was added at the east end of the north aisle. The chapel's east and north windows in the Transitional style between Decorated and Perpendicular Gothic date it to the chancel about the middle of the 14th century. Later pure Perpendicular Gothic additions include the windows and north door in the north aisle, the present clerestory and nave roof and the chancel arch. In 1870, the Gothic Revival architect Charles Buckeridge completely rebuilt the chancel. St. Nicholas' church is a Grade II* listed building.

The tower has a ring of six bells. Abraham I Rudhall of Gloucester cast the second and third bells in 1714. William Taylor of Loughborough cast the fifth and tenor bells in 1846 at the bellfoundry he then had in Oxford. Thomas Bond of Burford cast the fourth bell in 1911. The Whitechapel Bell Foundry cast the present tenor bell in 2006. There is also a Sanctus bell that Thomas Bond cast in 1911. In 2001, the Church of England Benefice of Ascott-under-Wychwood, Chadlington and Spelsbury merged with that of Enstone and Heythrop to form the Chase Benefice. The Parsonage was designed by William Wilkinson and built in 1863. It is now Chadlington House.

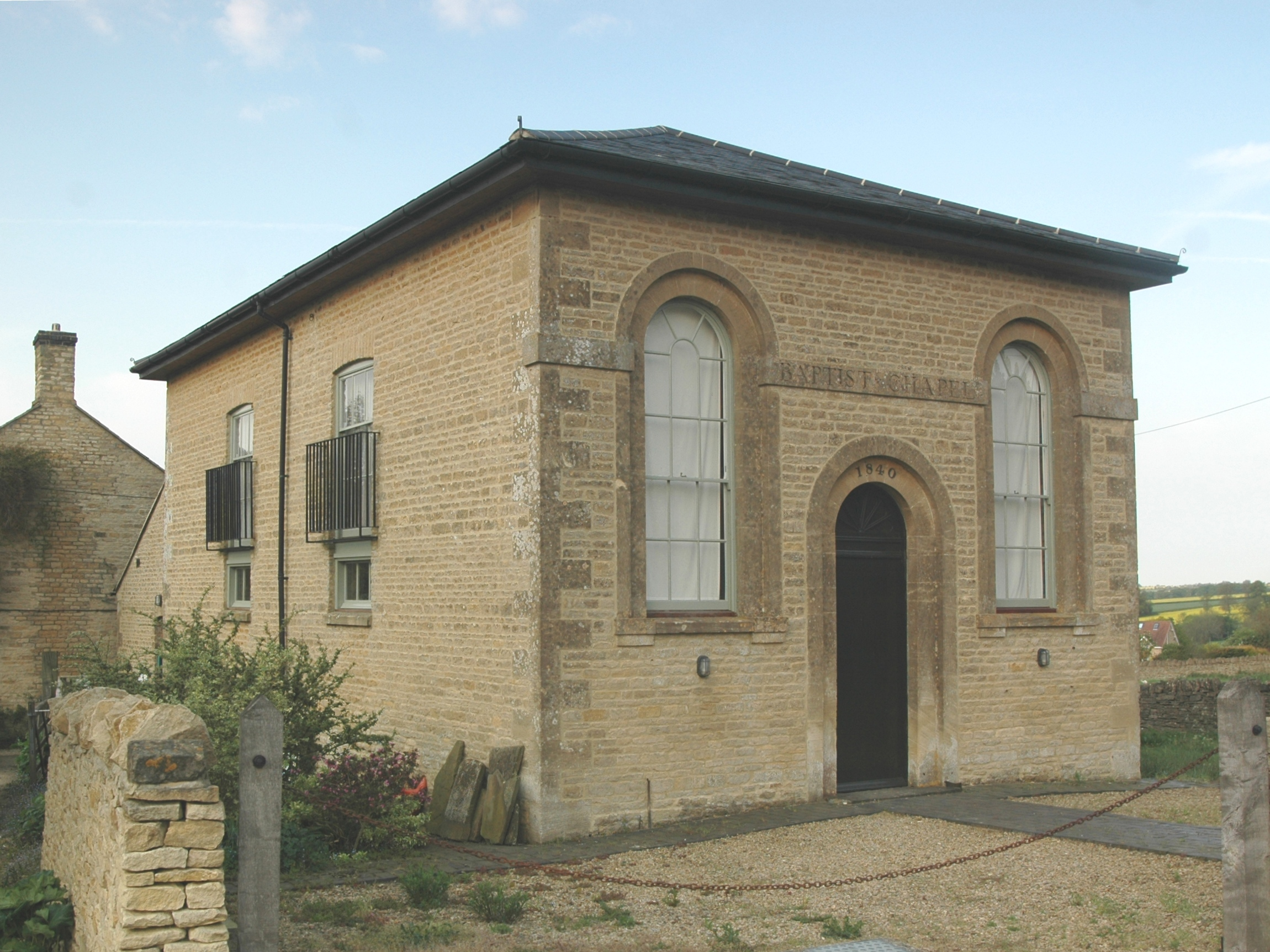
Former Baptist chapel, built 1840

=== Baptist ===
Chadlington Baptist chapel was built in 1840. It is now a private house.

=== Methodist ===
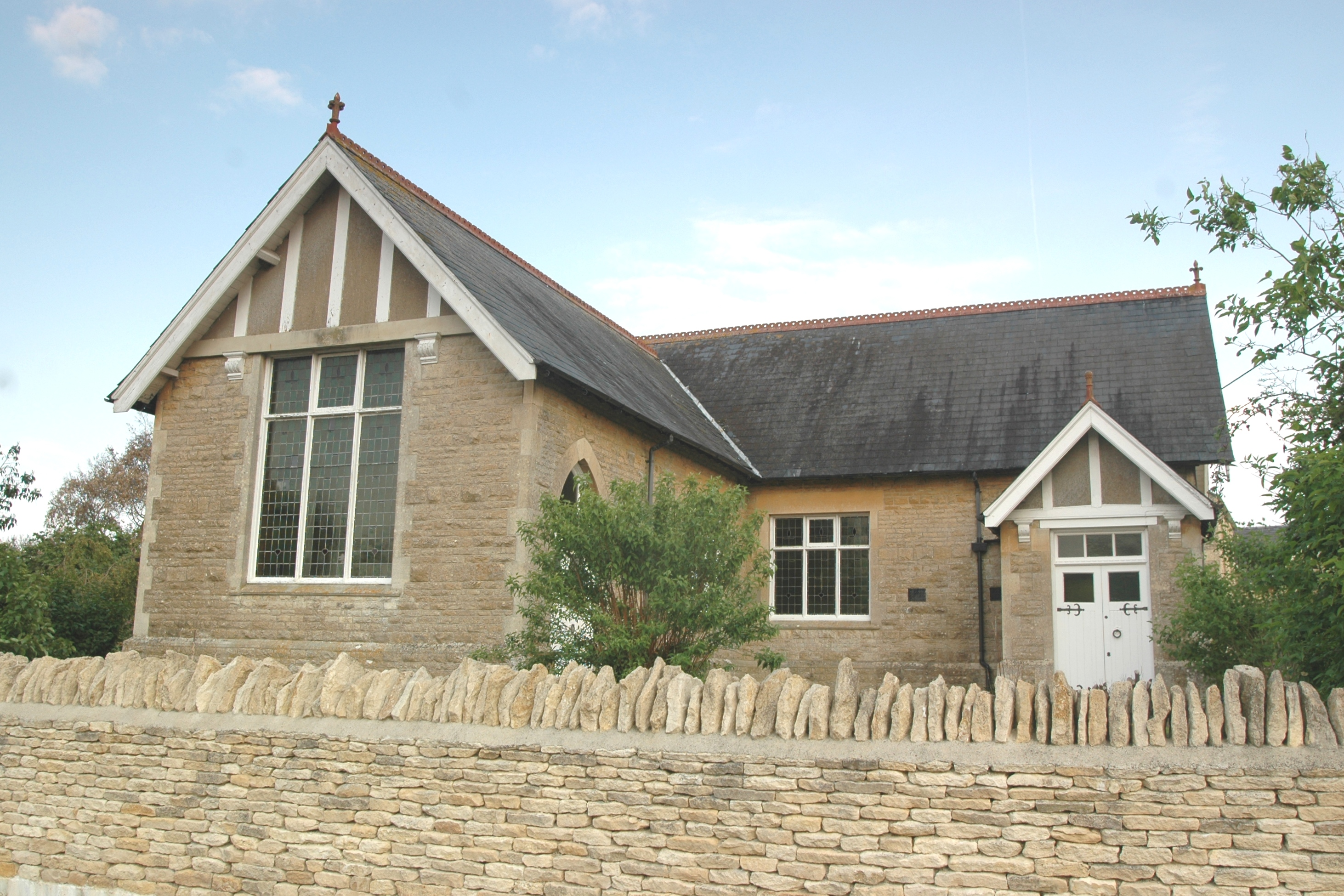
Chadlington Methodist church

Chadlington has a Methodist church. It is a member of Chipping Norton and Stow on the Wold Methodist Circuit.

== Social and economic history ==
Chadlington used to have three public houses, the Malt Shovel (closed down), the Tite Inn, and the Sandys Arms. The Tite Inn was closed between 2009 and 2012; it reopened in 2012 with new owners. and the Sandys Arms on Bull Hill closed some years earlier. Sir Henry Rawlinson (1810–95) and his brother Canon George Rawlinson (1812–1902) were born in Chadlington. Ivan Cameron, son of former Conservative Party Leader and Prime Minister David Cameron is buried in Chadlington.

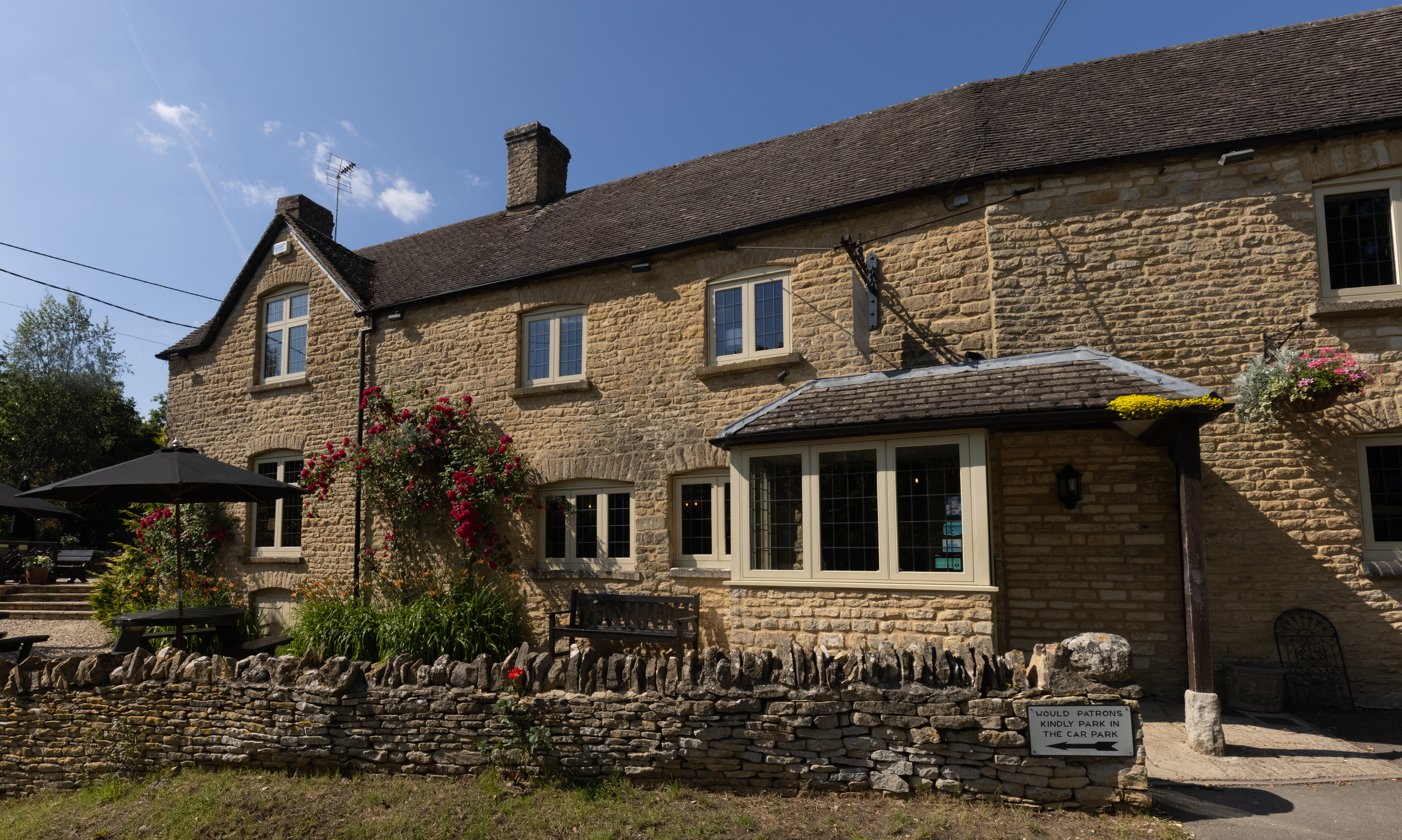
The Tite Inn public house

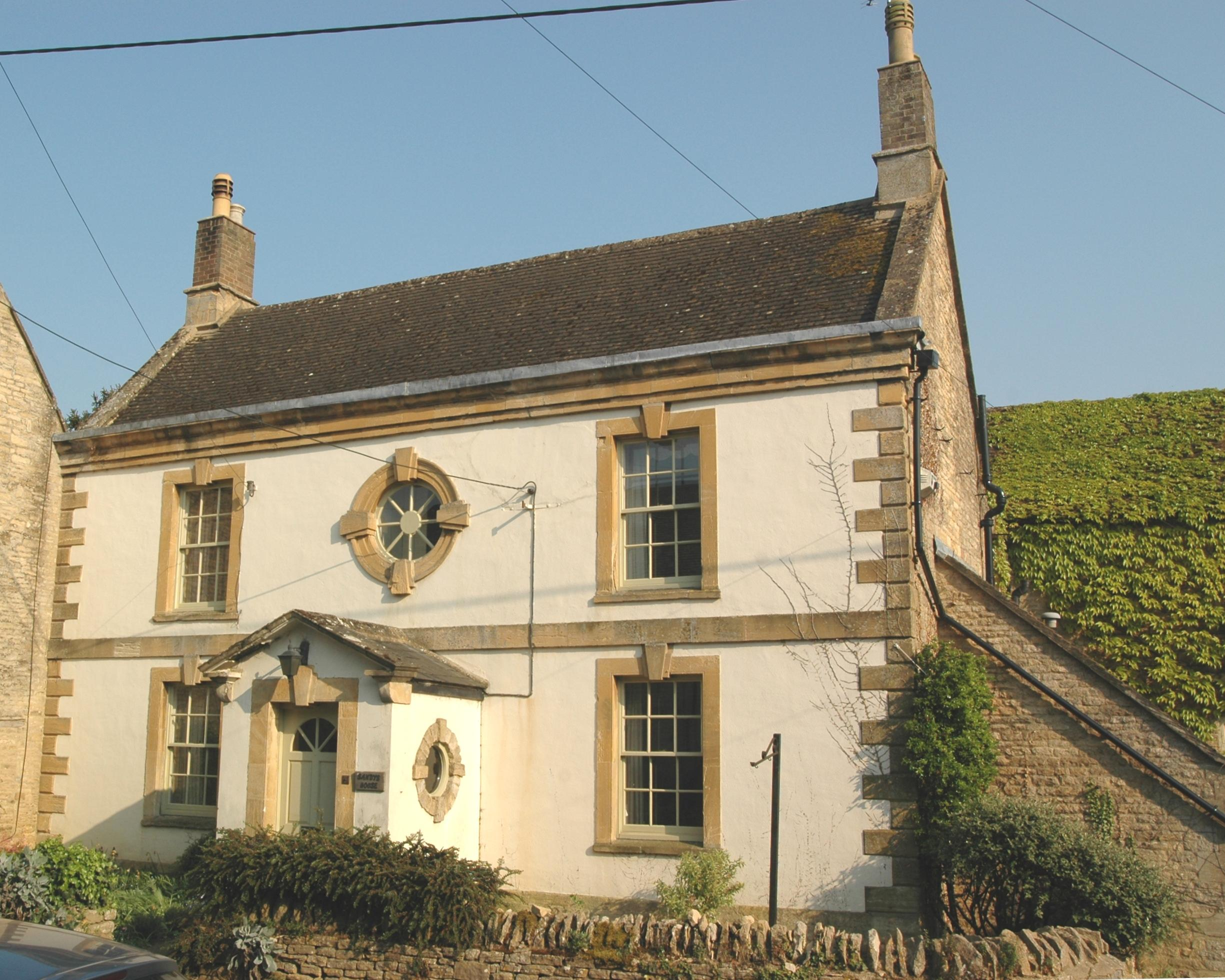
Sandys House, formerly the Sandys Arms public house

== Amenities ==
Chadlington Football Club play in the Witney and District League. As of January 2023, it has a team in Division One and another in division four as well as a youth team. Chadlington Cricket Club play in the Oxfordshire Cricket Association League. Both clubs are based at Chadlington Sports and Social Club. Chadlington also has a primary school and a playgroup. An annual fun run is held along Coldron Brook: The Great Brook Run. Proceeds of the race, which starts and ends at The Tite Inn, go to the parish primary school. Former Witney MP and Prime Minister David Cameron has taken part in the event.

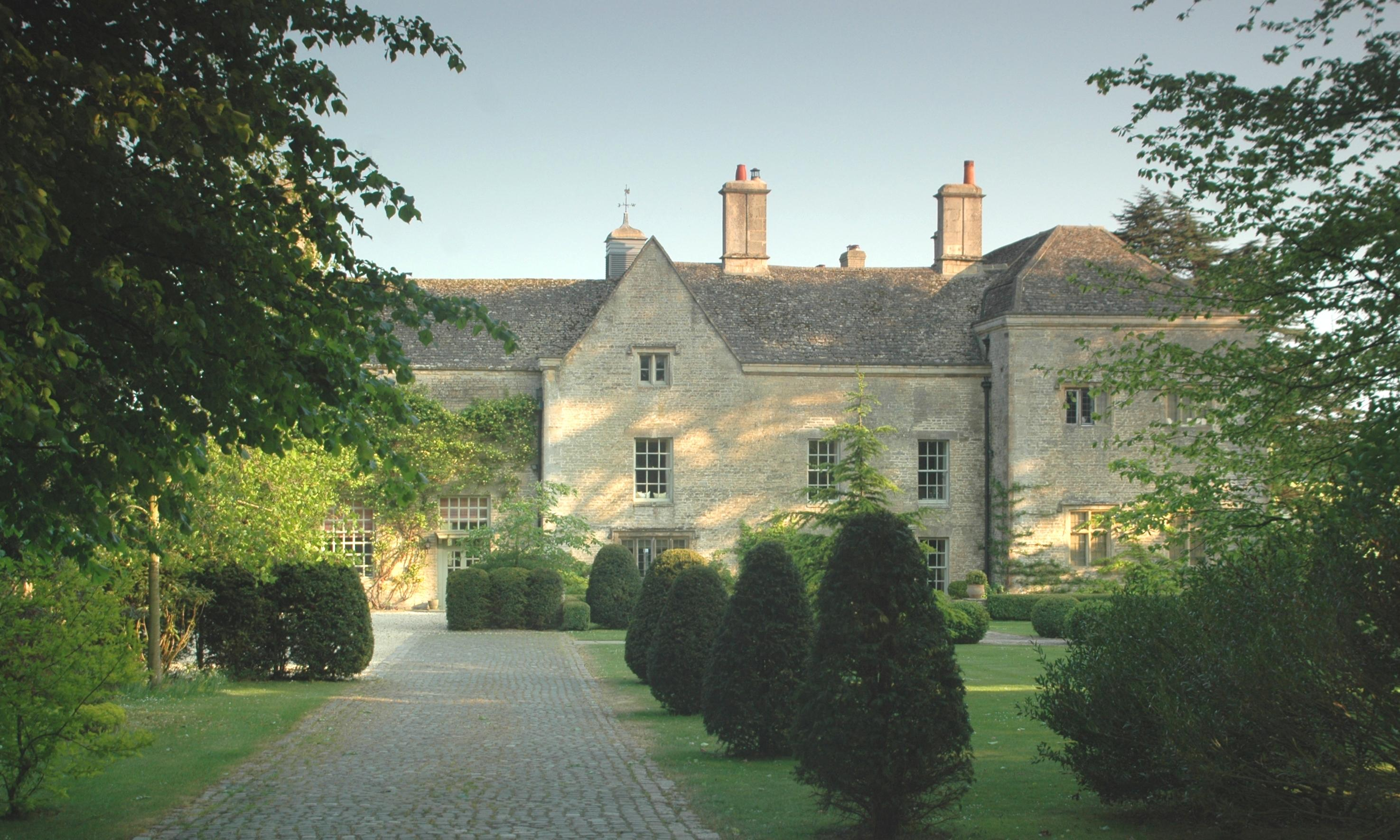
North front of Chadlington Manor House, built in the 17th century

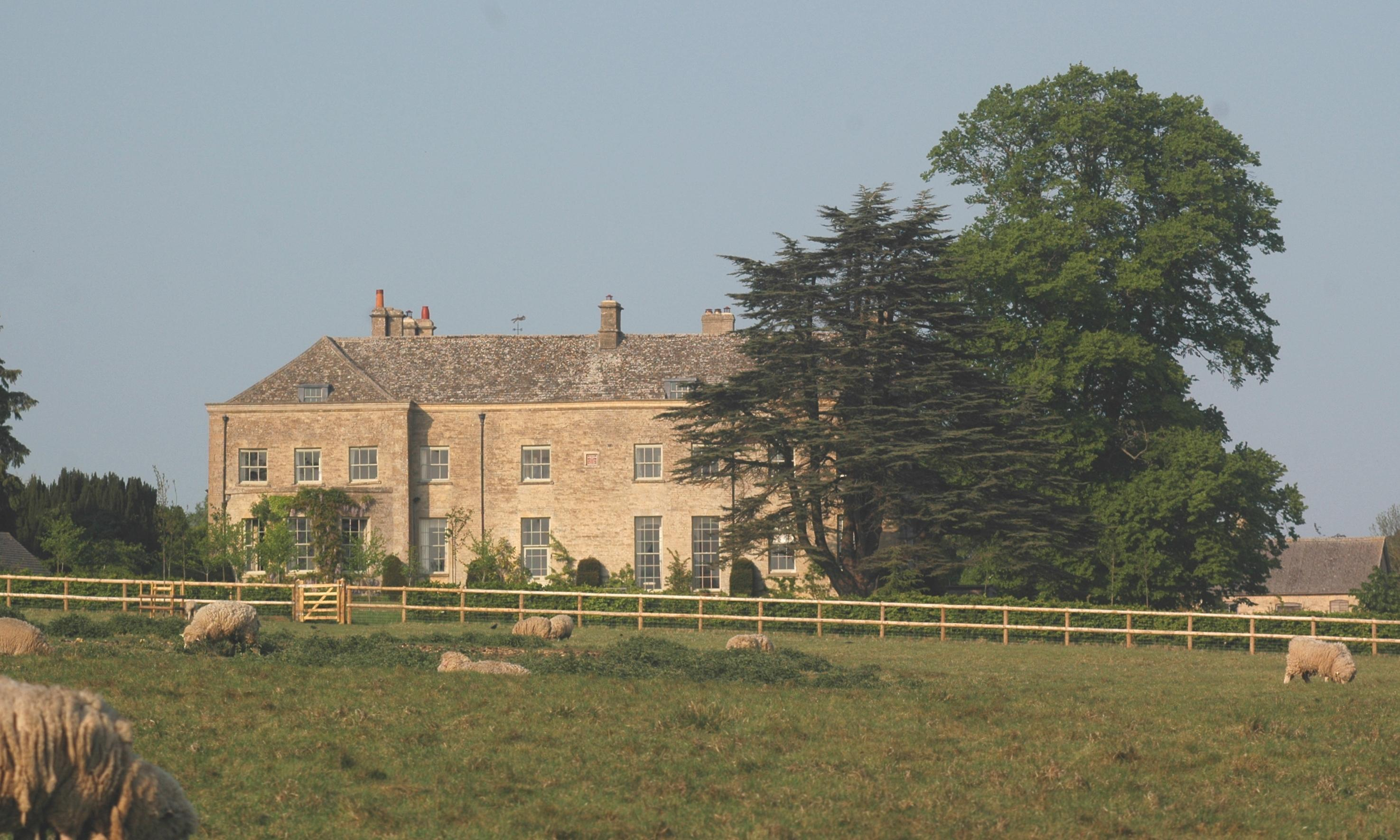
West front of Chadlington Manor House, added about 1800

== In popular culture ==
Chadlington is the location for filming of the television documentary series Clarkson's Farm about Jeremy Clarkson and his farm on the edge of the village.

== Sources and further reading ==
- Corbett, E. (1962). A History of Spelsbury. Banbury: Cheney and Sons. p. 20.
- Gilmour, Lauren (1992). "The Chadlington Sword — and the end of the siege of Oxford?" (PDF). Oxoniensia. LVII. Oxfordshire Architectural and Historical Society: 359–363.
- Leeds, E.T. (1940). "Two Saxon Cemeteries in North Oxfordshire" (PDF). Oxoniensia. V. Oxford Architectural and Historical Society: 21–32.
- Mudd, Andrew (1987). "Fieldwalking at Spelsburydown and in the Chadlington Area" (PDF). Oxoniensia. LII. Oxfordshire Architectural and Historical Society: 11–22.
- Salzman, Louis Francis; Page, William; Salter, Herbert E.; Lobel, Mary D.; Crossley, Alan (1939). "Anglo-Saxon Remains". A History of the County of Oxford. Victoria County History. Vol. 1: Natural history, etc. London: Archibald Constable & Co. pp. 357–360.
- Sherwood, Jennifer; Pevsner, Nikolaus (1974). Oxfordshire. The Buildings of England. Harmondsworth: Penguin Books. pp. 524–525. ISBN 0-14-071045-0.
