= Great Brook Run =

Annual run on 28 December in Chadlington, Oxfordshire, UK

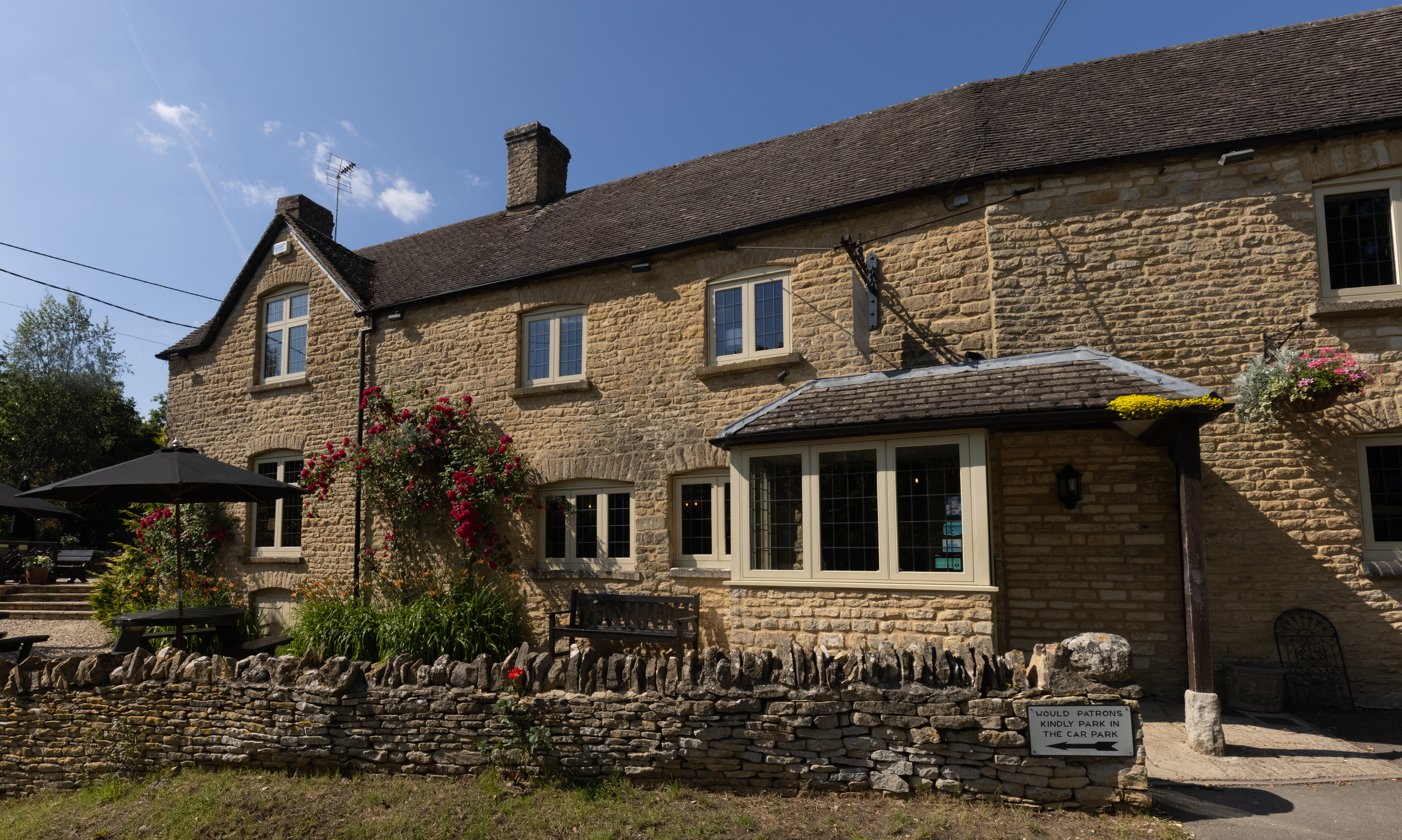
The Tite Inn serves as the start and finishing point of the race

The Great Brook Run is an annual mile-long cross country run which this year takes place on 28 December in Chadlington, Oxfordshire, England. It is a fun run event and all proceeds go to local charity, the Oxfordshire Association for the Blind. The course, which starts and finishes at the Tite Inn, is wet and muddy as it traces a path along the Coldron Brook (a stream in the village) and passes through a 3-foot tunnel under a bridge.

== History ==
The event was devised by Adam Engberg and James Kelly, and it was first held in 2006. The event has a fictional history which involves Vikings who attempt to invade the village in the year 1066, but find themselves thwarted by the brook. The course begins at the local pub – a 17th-century building called The Tite Inn – and sets off for half a mile in the brook before looping back and finishing at the same point.

Entrants, who donate £5 to take part, are encouraged to wear suitable clothing, although many fun-runners opt for fancy dress. People of all ages enter the competition and every competitor receives a medal, regardless of performance. Around seventy people competed in the first race in 2006 and this had increased to over 100 by the third edition.

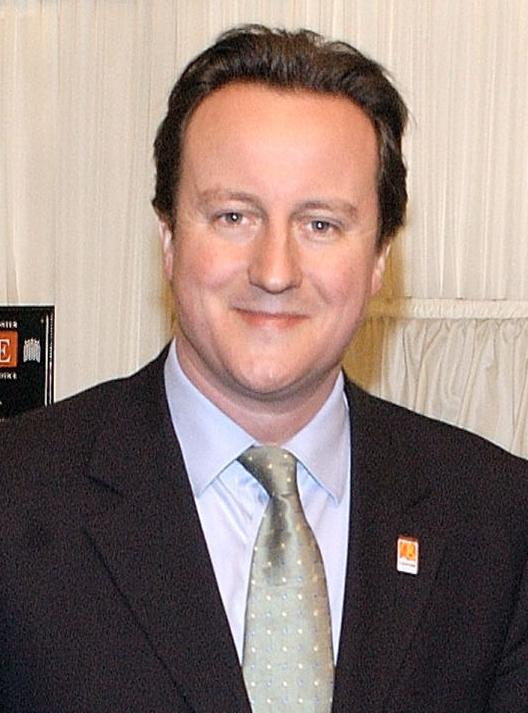
Conservative Leader David Cameron brought the event mainstream exposure in the media.

The first edition of the Great Brook Run was featured on the BBC's South Today, a regional news programme. The race received nationwide media attention following the second race owing to the participation of the Conservative Party Leader and future Prime Minister David Cameron, who was then Member of Parliament for the village's constituency (Witney). He acted as the race starter in 2007, and has taken part in 4 races, including in 2014. He finished 25th overall in 2008, beating a man dressed as Spider-Man to the finish line.

Sponsors for this year's event include Chadlington Brewery and Brittania.
