= William Hackblock =

Member of Parliament for Reigate
- In office 28 March 1857 – 2 January 1858
- Preceded by: Thomas Somers-Cocks
- Succeeded by: Henry Rawlinson

Personal details
- Born: 1805
- Died: 2 January 1858 (aged 52)
- Party: Independent Liberal

William Hackblock (1805 – 2 January 1858) was a British Independent Liberal politician.

Hackblock was elected MP for Reigate in 1857, but died less than a year later, in 1858.

Parliament of the United Kingdom
Preceded by Thomas Somers-Cocks	Member of Parliament for Reigate; 1857–1858	Succeeded by Henry Rawlinson
