= Sir Henry Rawlinson, 1st Baronet =

British army officer, politician and Orientalist (1810–1895)

Major-General Sir Henry Rawlinson Bt GCB FRS FRGS KLS
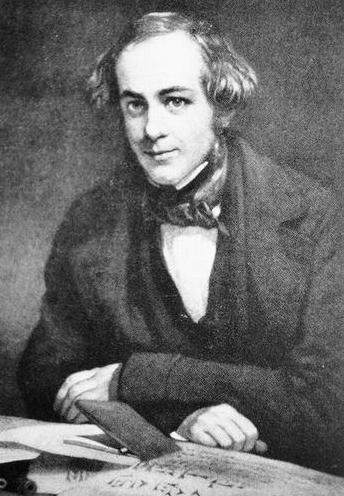
- Rawlinson in 1850

President of the Royal Geographical Society
- In office 1871–1873; 1874–1876
- Preceded by: Sir Roderick Murchison
- Succeeded by: Sir Henry Frere

Member of Parliament for Frome
- In office 1865–1868
- Preceded by: Lord Edward Thynne
- Succeeded by: Thomas Hughes

Member of Parliament for Reigate
- In office February – October 1858
- Preceded by: William Hackblock
- Succeeded by: William Monson

Personal details
- Born: Henry Creswicke Rawlinson; 5 April 1810 Chadlington, England
- Died: 5 March 1895 (aged 84) London, Middlesex, England
- Resting place: Brookwood Cemetery, Surrey
- Party: Liberal Party
- Relatives: George Rawlinson (brother)
- Employer: British East India Company
- Awards: Royal Geographical Society's Founder's Medal (1840); Knight Grand Cross of the Order of the Bath (1889)

Military service
- Allegiance: United Kingdom
- Branch: British Army
- Rank: Major-General
- Wars: First Anglo-Afghan War

Sir Henry Creswicke Rawlinson, 1st Baronet (5 April 1810 – 5 March 1895) was a British East India Company army officer, politician, and Orientalist, sometimes described as the Father of Assyriology. His son, also Henry, was to become a senior commander in the British Army during the First World War.

== Early life and army service ==
Rawlinson was born on 5 April 1810 at the place now known as Chadlington, Oxfordshire, England. He was the second son of Abraham Tysack Rawlinson and elder brother of historian George Rawlinson. In 1827, having become proficient in Farsi, he was sent to Persia in company with other British officers to drill and reorganize the Shah's troops. Disagreements between the Persian court and the British government, also involving Russia, ended in the departure of the British officers.

Rawlinson began to study Persian inscriptions, more particularly those in the cuneiform character, which had been only partially deciphered by Grotefend and Saint-Martin. For two years from 1836, he was in Kermanshah in western Iran, near the great cuneiform inscription at Behistun, written in Old Persian, Elamite, and Babylonian (a later form of Akkadian) by Darius the Great between 522 and 486 BC. Rawlinson was the first Westerner to transcribe the Old Persian portion of the text. With his knowledge of Old Persian, he set about deciphering the Elamite and Babylonian sections.

== Political career ==
Rawlinson was appointed political agent at Kandahar in 1840, serving for three years. In 1844, for his service to the British Empire in the course of the Afghan War, he was made Companion of the Order of the Bath.

A chance encounter with the governor-general resulted in his appointment as political agent in Ottoman Arabia. Settling in Baghdad, he devoted himself to cuneiform studies, and in 1847 he was able to send to Europe a full and accurate transcript of the Behistun inscription, which he was also successful in deciphering and interpreting. Having collected a large amount of antiquarian and geographical information in the pursuit of various explorations, including visits with Sir Austen Henry Layard to the ruins of Nineveh, he returned to England on leave of absence in 1849.

He was elected a Fellow of the Royal Society in February 1850, praised as "The Discoverer of the key to the Ancient Persian, Babylonian, and Assyrian Inscriptions in the Cuneiform character. The Author of various papers on the philology, antiquities, and Geography of Mesopotamia and Central Asia. Eminent as a Scholar".

Remaining at home for two years, in 1851 he published his memoir on the Behistun inscription and was promoted to lieutenant-colonel. The British Museum took custody of his valuable collection of Babylonian, Sabaean and Sassanian antiquities, and made him a considerable grant to continue Layard's Assyrian and Babylonian excavations. In 1851, he returned to Baghdad, where his archaeological finds contributed greatly to the final decipherment and interpretation of the cuneiform character. Rawlinson's greatest contribution was the discovery that individual cuneiform signs had multiple readings depending on their context. Rawlinson worked with the younger George Smith at the British Museum.

An equestrian accident in 1855 hastened his determination to return to England, and in that year, he resigned his post in the East India Company. Prior to his return, Rawlinson was involved in the ill-fated French mission to ship over 200 cases of antiquities to Europe, which were mostly lost at Al-Qurnah.

On his return to England, he received the distinction of Knight Commander of the Order of the Bath, and he was appointed a crown director of the East India Company.

The remaining forty years of his life were full of activity (political, diplomatic and scientific) and were spent mainly in London. From February to September 1858, he sat as member of parliament for Reigate, and he was appointed a member of the first India Council. He left again in 1859, when he was sent to Persia as envoy plenipotentiary, but returned after a year owing to his dissatisfaction with the position. He was MP for Frome from 1865 to 1868, and again served on the Council of India from 1868 until his death.

== Attitudes concerning Russia ==
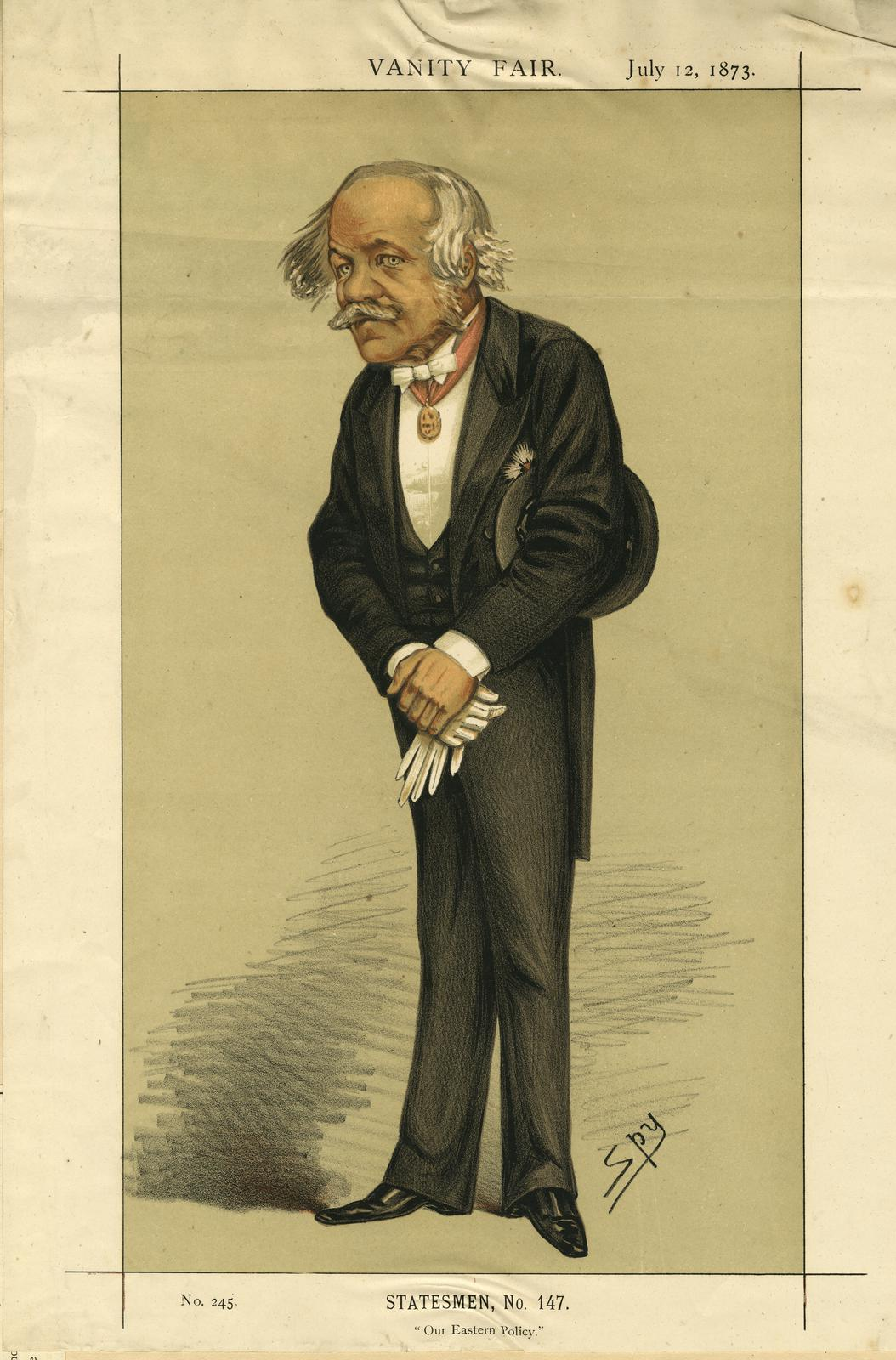
"Our Eastern Policy", a caricature by "Spy", published in Vanity Fair, July 1873

Rawlinson was one of the most important figures arguing that Britain must check Russian ambitions in South Asia. He was a strong advocate of the Forward Policy in Afghanistan and counselled the retention of Kandahar. He argued that Tsarist Russia would attack and absorb Kokand, Bukhara and Khiva (which occurred, and the regions are now parts of Uzbekistan) and warned that it would invade Persia (Iran) and Afghanistan as springboards to British India.

== Later life ==
He was a trustee of the British Museum from 1876 to his death. He was appointed a Knight Grand Cross of the Order of the Bath in 1889, and created a baronet in 1891; he was president of the Royal Geographical Society from 1874 to 1875 and of the Royal Asiatic Society from 1869 to 1871 and 1878 to 1881; and received honorary degrees at Oxford, Cambridge, and Edinburgh.

He married Louisa Caroline Harcourt Seymour, daughter of Jane (née Hopkinson) and Henry Seymour, on 2 September 1862, with whom he had two sons: Henry and Alfred. He was widowed on 31 October 1889 and died in London of influenza five years later. He is buried in Brookwood Cemetery in Surrey.

== Published works ==
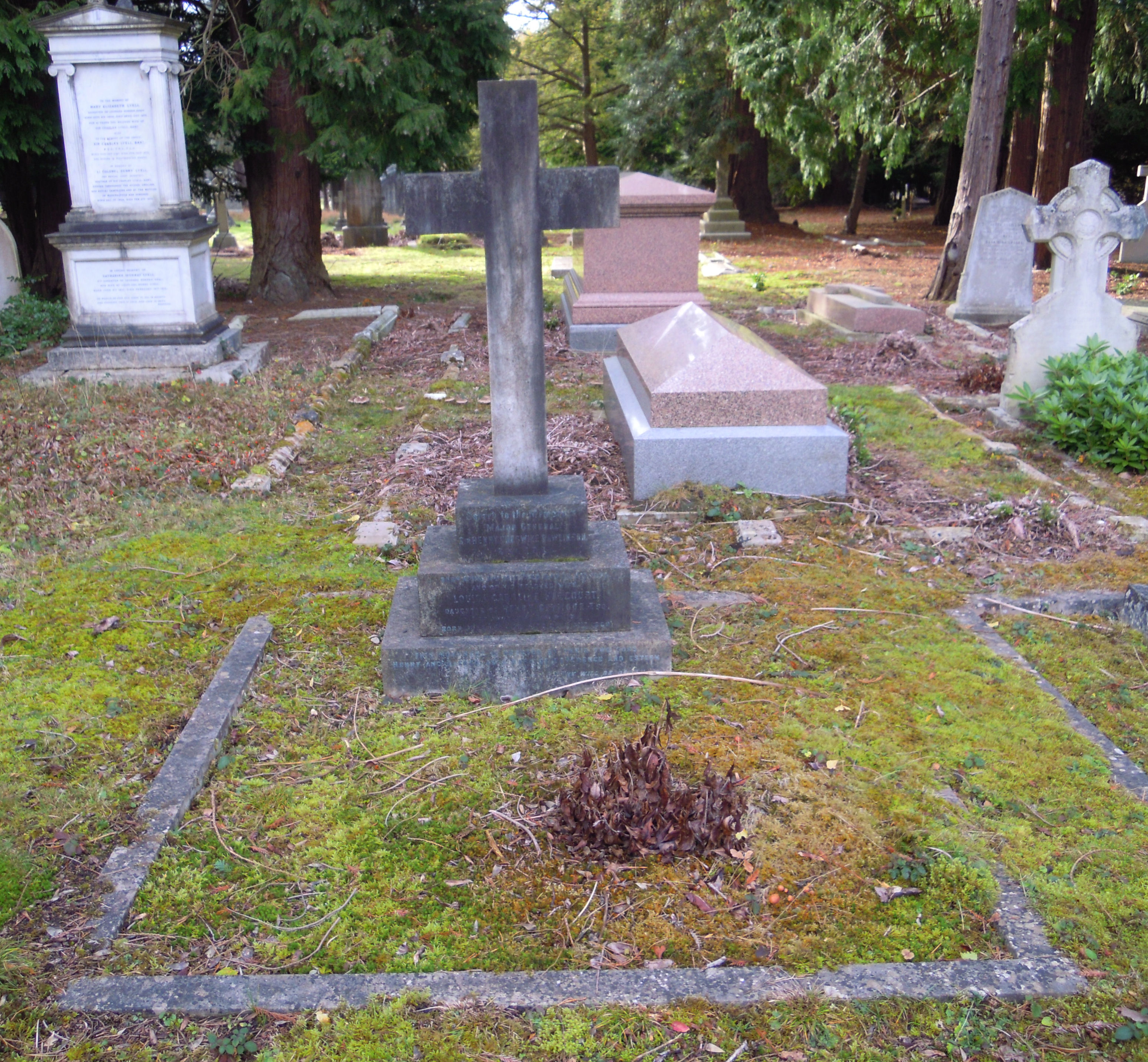
Rawlinson's grave at Brookwood Cemetery

Rawlinson's published works include four volumes of cuneiform inscriptions, published under his direction between 1870 and 1884 by the trustees of the British Museum; The Persian Cuneiform Inscription at Behistun (1846–1851) and Outline of the History of Assyria (1852), both reprinted from the Asiatic Society's journals; A Commentary on the Cuneiform Inscriptions of Babylon and Assyria (1850); Notes on the Early History of Babylonia (1854); and England and Russia in the East (1875). He also made a variety of minor contributions to the publications of learned societies. He contributed articles on Baghdad, the Euphrates and Kurdistan to the ninth edition of the Encyclopædia Britannica, together with several other articles dealing with the East; and he assisted in editing a translation of The Histories of Herodotus by his brother, Canon George Rawlinson.

== Works ==
- Rawlinson, H. C. (1848). "The Persian Cuneiform Inscription at Behistun, Decyphered and Translated; With a Memoir on Persian Cuneiform Inscriptions in General, and on That of Behistun in Particular". Journal of the Royal Asiatic Society of Great Britain and Ireland. 10: i–349. ISSN 0035-869X. JSTOR 25581217.

== Sources ==
- This article incorporates text from a publication now in the public domain: Chisholm, Hugh, ed. (1911). "Rawlinson, Sir Henry Creswicke". Encyclopædia Britannica. Vol. 22 (11th ed.). Cambridge University Press. pp. 928–929.
- Hansard 1803–2005: contributions in Parliament by Sir Henry Rawlinson
- Adkins, Lesley (2003). Empires of the Plain: Henry Rawlinson and the Lost Languages of Babylon. HarperCollins. ISBN 978-0-00-712899-0.
- Rawlinson, George (1898). A Memoir of Major-General Sir Henry Creswicke Rawlinson. London: Longmans, Green and Co – via Internet Archive.

Parliament of the United Kingdom
| Preceded by William Hackblock | Member of Parliament for Reigate; February 1858 – October 1858 | Succeeded by William Monson |
| Preceded by Lord Edward Thynne | Member of Parliament for Frome; 1865 – 1868 | Succeeded by Thomas Hughes |
Baronetage of the United Kingdom
| New creation | Baronet (of North Walsham); 1891–1895 | Succeeded by Henry Rawlinson |
