= Thomas Somers-Cocks =

British politician and banker

Thomas Somers-Cocks (5 February 1815 – 30 August 1899) was a British Conservative Party politician and a banker. He was a founding member of the Canterbury Association.

== Early life ==
Cocks was born at Thames Bank, Marlow, Buckinghamshire. His parents were Thomas Somers-Cocks (b.1769), a banker of Thames Bank, and Agneta Pole-Carew, 5th daughter of Sir Reginald Pole-Carew and sister of William Pole-Carew. Lord Somers as head of the family was chosen as his godfather. His father's oldest sister, Mrs Vernon, became his godmother. He received his education at Christ Church, Oxford, but did not obtain a degree.

Cocks became engaged to Sarah Louisa Wynne just before he turned 27. They married on 24 May 1842. She was the daughter of Charles Griffith-Wynne and the sister of Charlotte Griffith Wynne, who married John Robert Godley.

They had three children: Thomas Somers Vernon (1850–1932), Alfred Heneage (1851 – ca 1930/31) and Alice Agneta (1853–1899).

== Canterbury Association ==
He attended the inaugural meeting of the Canterbury Association on 27 Mar 1848, joined the management committee and became the banker for the group.

== Politics ==
Somers-Cocks was elected at the 1847 general election as the Member of Parliament (MP) for borough of Reigate in Surrey. He was re-elected in 1852, and held the seat until he stood down at the 1857 general election.

== Death and commemoration ==
His wife died in the 1894 influenza epidemic. Cocks died on 30 August 1899 at Thames Bank, Great Marlow. Somers Place in the Christchurch (New Zealand) suburb of Spreydon is named after him. Mount Somers / Te Kiekie, a mountain in the foothills of the Southern Alps, was named after him. Subsequently, the name Mount Somers was used for a nearby village and a railway branch line.

== Notes ==
Parliament of the United Kingdom
Preceded by Charles Somers-Cocks	Member of Parliament for Reigate; 1847–1857	Succeeded by William Hackblock
