= Knollbury =

Archaeological site in England

Coordinates: 51.9047°N 1.5415°W

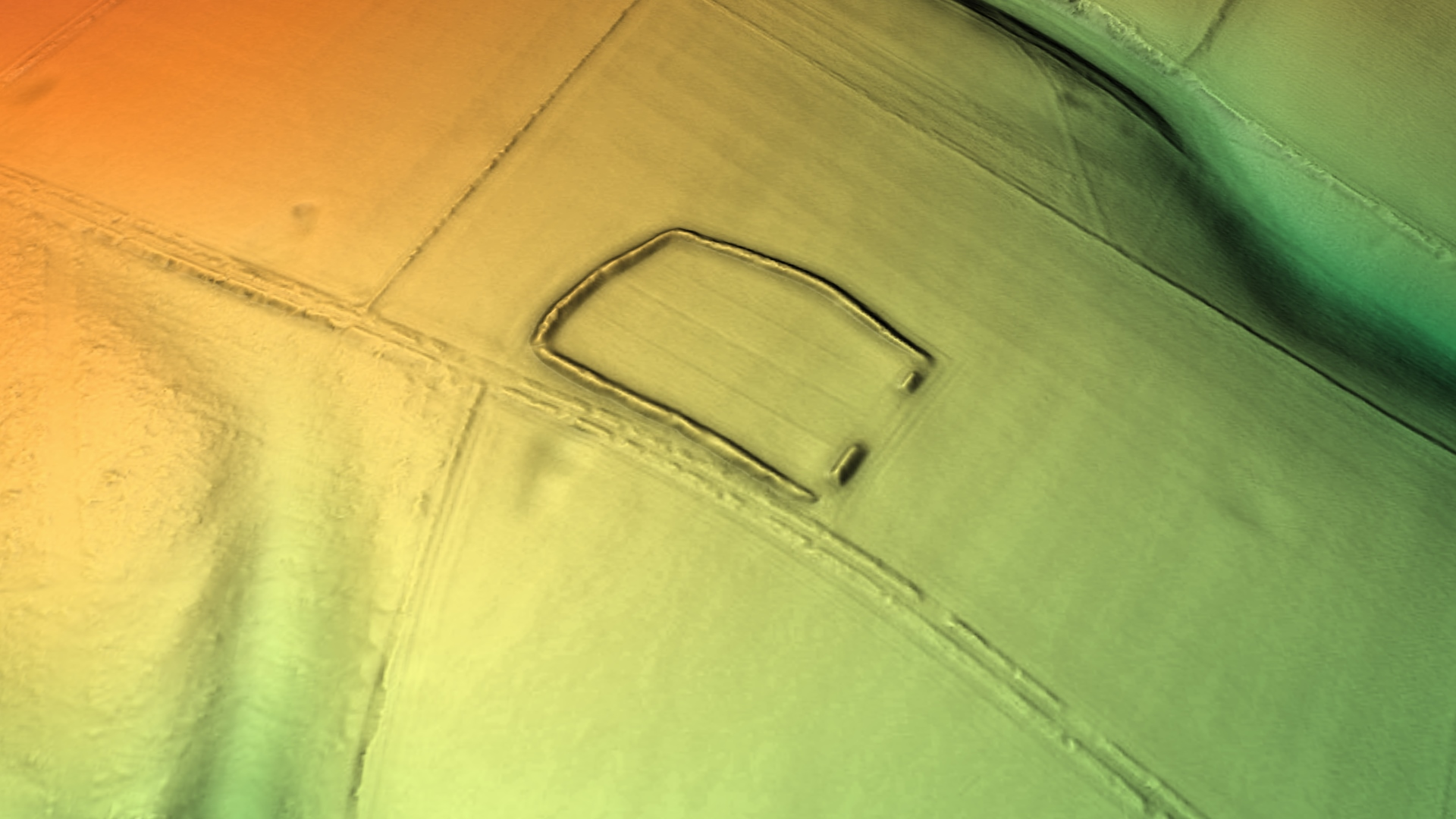
3D view of the digital terrain model

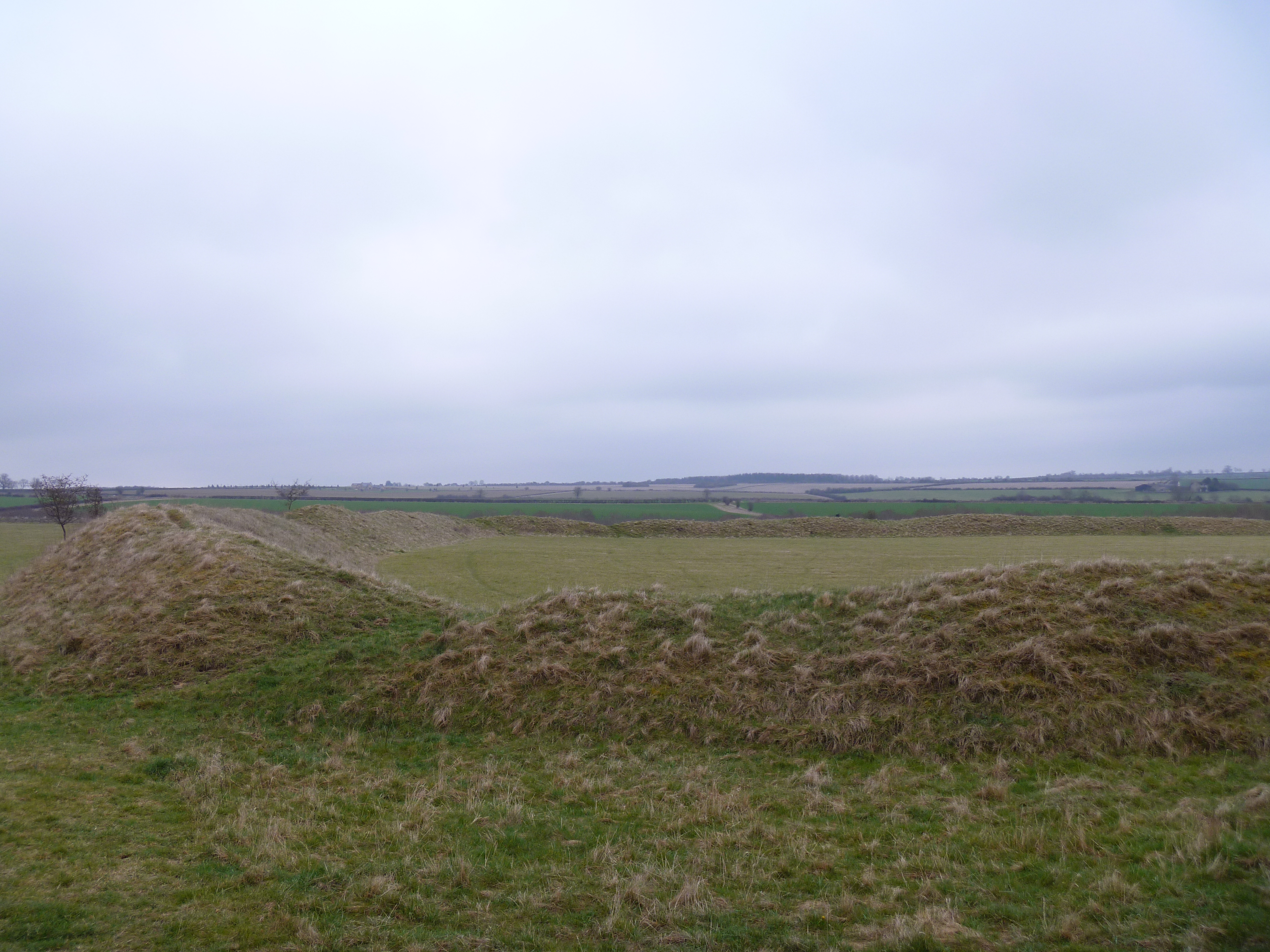
Knollbury in March 2012

Knollbury is a scheduled Iron Age hillfort enclosure to the north west of Chadlington in Oxfordshire, England. Believed to be defensive in nature the enclosure is rectangular (100 metres by 150 metres) formed by a 2-to-4-metre-high (6.6 to 13.1 ft) and 10-metre-wide (33 ft) earth banks. The two gaps in the earth banks at the eastern corners are believed to be of a later date.

Knollbury featured briefly in Clarkson's Farm Series 5 Episode 1, where it was erroneously described as a Neolithic structure.
