= Henry Rawlinson, 1st Baron Rawlinson =

British Army general (1864–1925)

General The Right Honourable The Lord Rawlinson GCB GCSI GCVO KCMG
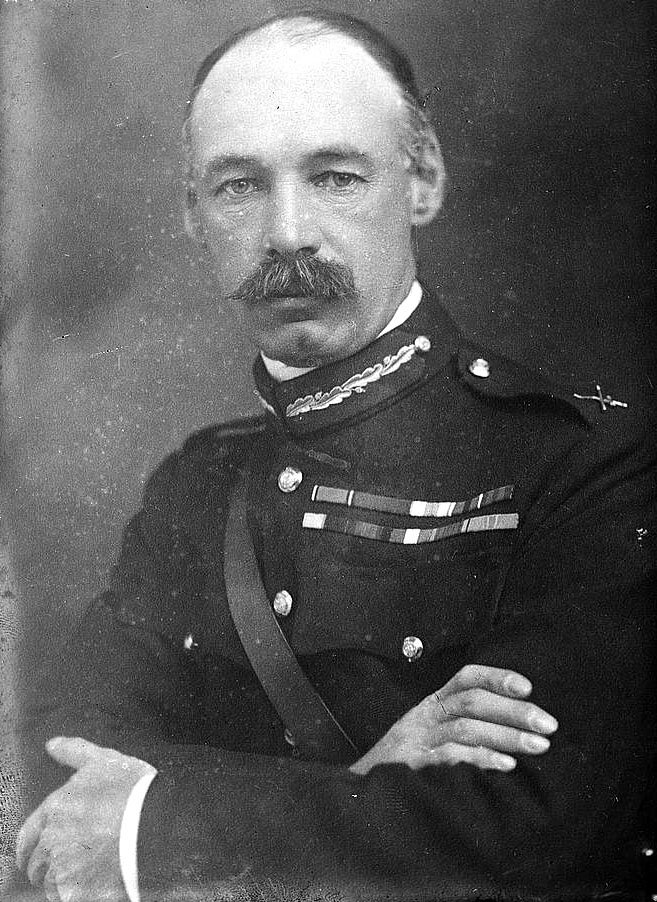
- Rawlinson in 1916
- Born: 20 February 1864; Trent Manor, Dorset, England
- Died: 28 March 1925 (aged 61); Delhi, British India
- Burial place: St Andrew's Church, Trent, Dorset
- Spouse: Meredyth Sophia Frances Kennard
- Military career
- Allegiance: United Kingdom
- Branch: British Army
- Service years: 1884–1925
- Rank: General
- Units: King's Royal Rifle Corps; Coldstream Guards
- Commands: Commander-in-Chief, India; Aldershot Command; Second Army; Fourth Army; First Army; IV Corps; 4th Division; 3rd Division; 2nd Infantry Brigade; Staff College, Camberley
- Conflicts: Mahdist War; Third Anglo-Burmese War; Second Boer War; Battle of Rooiwal; First World War; Siege of Antwerp; First Battle of Ypres; Battle of Neuve-Chapelle; Battle of the Somme; Battle of Bazentin Ridge; Battle of Guillemont; Battle of Flers-Courcelette; Battle of Morval; Hundred Days Offensive; Battle of Amiens; Battle of Épehy; Battle of St Quentin Canal; Battle of the Selle; Battle of the Sambre; North Russia intervention
- Awards: Knight Grand Cross of the Order of the Bath; Knight Grand Commander of the Order of the Star of India; Knight Grand Cross of the Royal Victorian Order; Knight Commander of the Order of St Michael and St George; Mentioned in Despatches

General Henry Seymour Rawlinson, 1st Baron Rawlinson, GCB, GCSI, GCVO, KCMG (20 February 1864 – 28 March 1925), known as Sir Henry Rawlinson, 2nd Baronet between 1895 and 1919, was a senior British Army officer in the First World War who commanded the Fourth Army of the British Expeditionary Force at the battles of the Somme (1916) and Amiens (1918) as well as the breaking of the Hindenburg Line (1918). He also commanded the Indian Army from 1920 until his sudden death in 1925.

== Early life ==
Rawlinson was born at Trent Manor in Dorset on 20 February 1864. His father, Sir Henry Rawlinson, 1st Baronet, was an Army officer, and a renowned Middle East scholar who is generally recognised as the father of Assyriology. His mother was Louisa Caroline Harcourt Seymour (1828-1889). He received his early formal education at Eton College.

== Early military career ==
After passing out from the Royal Military College, Sandhurst, Rawlinson entered the British Army as a lieutenant in the King's Royal Rifle Corps in India on 6 February 1884. His father arranged for him to serve on the staff of a friend, General Sir Frederick Roberts, the Commander-in-Chief, India. Rawlinson and the Roberts family remained close friends throughout his life. When Roberts died in November 1914, Rawlinson wrote, "I feel as if I have lost my second father." His first military experience was serving in Burma in 1886 at the end of the Third Anglo-Burmese War.

=== Colonial service ===
In October 1889, Rawlinson's mother died and he returned to Britain. He transferred to the Coldstream Guards, and was promoted to captain, dated 4 November 1891. He attended the Staff College, Camberley, gaining his psc, from 1892 to 1893, which brought him into contact with Henry Wilson, Aylmer Haldane, Thomas Snow, Alexander Hamilton-Gordon, Hubert Hamilton and Frederick Gordon, all of whom would rise to high rank in the First World War, Wilson in particular going on to become a field marshal. While there he "profited greatly from the teaching skills and engaging personality of the military historian G. F. R. Henderson".

On 18 November 1895 he succeeded Frederick Robb, later a major general, as a brigade major in Aldershot, Hampshire. He then served on Major General Herbert Kitchener's staff during the advance on Omdurman in Sudan in 1898, and was promoted to major on 25 January 1899 and to brevet lieutenant colonel on 26 January 1899.

Rawlinson served with distinction in a field command in the Second Boer War from 1899 to 1902, being made an assistant adjutant general in March 1900, earning promotion to the local rank of colonel on 6 May 1901. He was in Western Transvaal during early 1902, and led a column taking part in the Battle of Rooiwal, the last battle of the war (11 April 1902).

Following the end of hostilities in South Africa in June 1902, he returned to the United Kingdom together with Lord Kitchener on board the SS Orotava, which arrived in Southampton on 12 July. In a despatch dated 23 June 1902, Lord Kitchener wrote of Rawlinson that he "possesses the qualities of Staff Officer and Column Commander in the field. His characteristics will always ensure him a front place in whatever he sets his mind to." For his service in the war, Rawlinson was appointed a Companion of the Order of the Bath in the April 1901 South Africa Honours list (the award was dated to 29 November 1900), and he received the actual decoration after his return home, from Edward VII at Buckingham Palace on 24 October 1902.

Rawlinson had received the brevet rank of colonel in the 1902 Coronation Honours, published on 26 June, was promoted to the substantive rank of colonel on 1 April 1903, and named as commandant of the Staff College, Camberley in December 1903, taking over from Colonel Herbert Miles, who was described by one biographer as "insufficiently practical".

=== Staff College ===
Rawlinson was the first of three reforming commandants who transformed the Staff College into a real war school. The curriculum was modernised and updated, the teaching given a new sense of purpose and instructors became 'directing staff' rather than 'professors', emphasising practicality. Reade Godwin-Austen, historian of the college, wrote:

"Blessed with an extremely attractive personality, a handsome appearance, high social standing, and more than an average share of this world's goods, he was one to inspire his students unconsciously to follow in his footsteps."

Historian Brian Bond wrote:

There could hardly have been a better choice as Miles's successor than Sir Henry Rawlinson. He was obsessed with the importance of improving military education and training, and he had proved himself to be an energetic and capable leader in the field as well as a first-rate staff officer.

He remained commandant until January 1907 when he was placed on half-pay.

On 1 March 1907 he succeeded Colonel Edwin Alderson as general officer commanding (GOC) of the 2nd Infantry Brigade, then stationed at Aldershot, and was promoted to temporary brigadier general (although he only held the rank while he held this appointment, as brigadier general, as it then was, was not then a substantive rank.) Having been promoted to substantive major general on 10 May 1909, and after giving up command of the 2nd Brigade, he became GOC of the 3rd Division in June 1910, in succession to Major General William Franklyn.

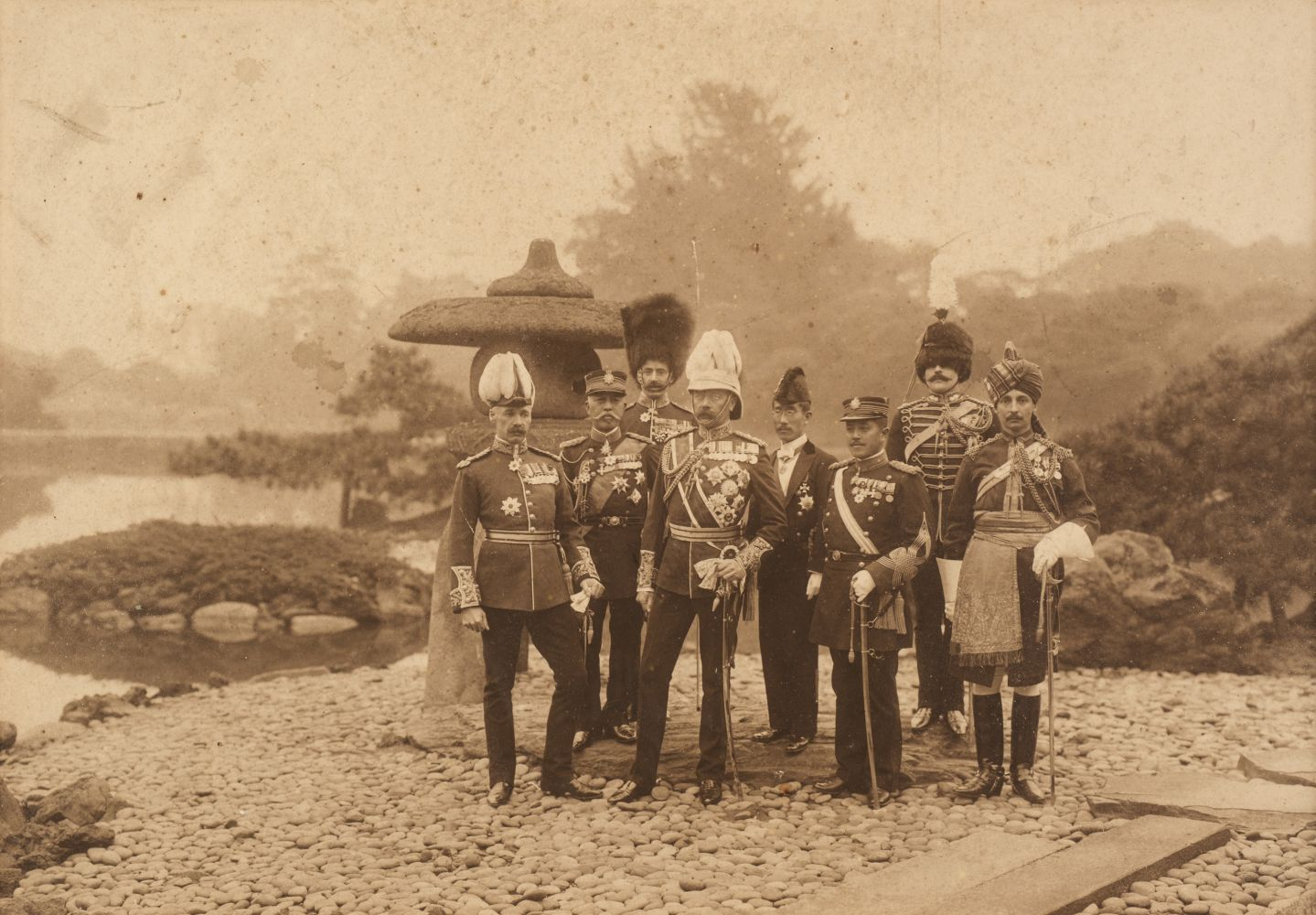
Group of Lord Kitchener's Mission to Japan to attend the Imperial Grand Japanese Manoeuvres. Taken in the grounds of the Shiba Palace, Tokyo, November 1909. Major General Sir Henry Rawlinson stands on the extreme left.

In the Army Manoeuvres of 1912, which took place in June, he showed an appreciation of the use of artillery, The Times correspondent noting approvingly:

An operation of altogether unusual character took place yesterday on Salisbury Plain when Major-general Sir Henry Rawlinson's 3rd Division practised combined field firing on a scale, which, so far as the writer can recall, has never been attempted before.

The historians Robin Prior and Trevor Wilson praise Rawlinson's foresight in considering combining infantry with the fire-power of machine-guns and artillery. After handing over the division to his successor, Major General Hubert Hamilton (who would later become the first British divisional commander killed in the war which had not yet been declared), in May 1914 Rawlinson went on leave, returning on the outbreak of war to briefly serve as director of recruiting at the War Office.

== First World War ==
=== Western Front ===
In September 1914, just weeks after the British entry into World War I, Rawlinson was appointed temporarily as GOC of the 4th Division of the British Expeditionary Force in France, in the place of Major General Thomas Snow, who had been injured when his horse fell on him. "This gave him a first, albeit brief, glimpse of stalemated trench warfare as it had developed on the Aisne. That appointment also proved short-lived".

Promoted to temporary lieutenant general on 4 October 1914, he then took command of the IV Corps.

In late September, the Belgian government formally requested British military assistance in defending Antwerp. IV Corps, acting under orders from the Cabinet, was chosen to reinforce the city. Rawlinson arrived in Antwerp on 6 October. It was soon obvious that the combined British, Belgian, and French forces were too weak to hold the city, and Kitchener decided on an evacuation two days later.

IV Corps and the remnants of the Belgian Army successfully re-joined Allied forces in Western Belgium, with the Cabinet returning Rawlinson's corps to the BEF, commanded by Field Marshal Sir John French.

IV Corps marched into Ypres on the night of 13–14 October, where the BEF, advancing northwards, was preparing to meet the German Army. Located at the centre of the British line, IV Corps met the main thrust of the German attacks between 18 and 27 October and suffered heavy casualties.

On 28 October, IV Corps was put under the temporary command of Lieutenant General Sir Douglas Haig, GOC I Corps, while Rawlinson went to England to oversee the preparation of the 8th Division, which would form part of his corps. When he returned in November the German attacks on Ypres had died down.

Rawlinson wrote to the Conservative politician Edward Stanley, 17th Earl of Derby (24 December 1914) forecasting that the Allies would win a war of attrition but it was unclear whether this would take one, two or three years.

In 1915, IV Corps formed part of the First Army of the BEF, commanded by Haig, now a full general. At the Battle of Neuve Chapelle (10–12 March 1915), he massed 340 guns. The weight of this bombardment on a comparatively narrow front enabled the attackers to secure the village and 1,600 yd (1,500 m) of the German front line. The arrival of German reinforcements prevented further advance. Rawlinson concluded that an enemy's line of trenches could be broken 'with suitable artillery preparation' combined with secrecy. He also drew a lesson, that trench warfare called for limited advances: 'What I want to do now is what I call "Bite & Hold" – bite off a piece of the enemy's line like Neuve Chapelle & hold it against all counter-attacks...there ought to be no difficulty in holding against the enemy's counterattacks & inflicting on him at least twice the loss that we have suffered in making the bite'.

At the end of 1915, Rawlinson was considered for command of the First Army, in succession to Haig, who succeeded French as commander-in-chief of the BEF, but the command was instead given to General Sir Charles Monro. He was promoted to temporary general on 22 December 1915.

Promoted to the substantive rank of lieutenant general "for distinguished service in the Field" on 1 January 1916, Rawlinson assumed command of the new Fourth Army on 24 January 1916. The Army would play a major role in the planned Allied offensive on the Somme. He wrote in his diary:

It is not the lot of many men to command an army of over half a million men.

The offensive was originally conceived as a joint Anglo-French offensive but owing to the demands of the Battle of Verdun, French participation was reduced from one half to one third of the total number of troops engaged, leaving the British, and especially Rawlinson's inexperienced army, to bear the brunt of the offensive. On the eve of the offensive, he "showed an attitude of absolute confidence". To his diary he confided some uncertainties: "What the actual results will be no one can say but I feel pretty confident of success myself though only after heavy fighting. That the bosh [sic] will break and that a debacle will supervene I do not believe..." He was not satisfied that the wire was well cut and enemy trenches sufficiently "knocked about".

=== Battle of the Somme ===
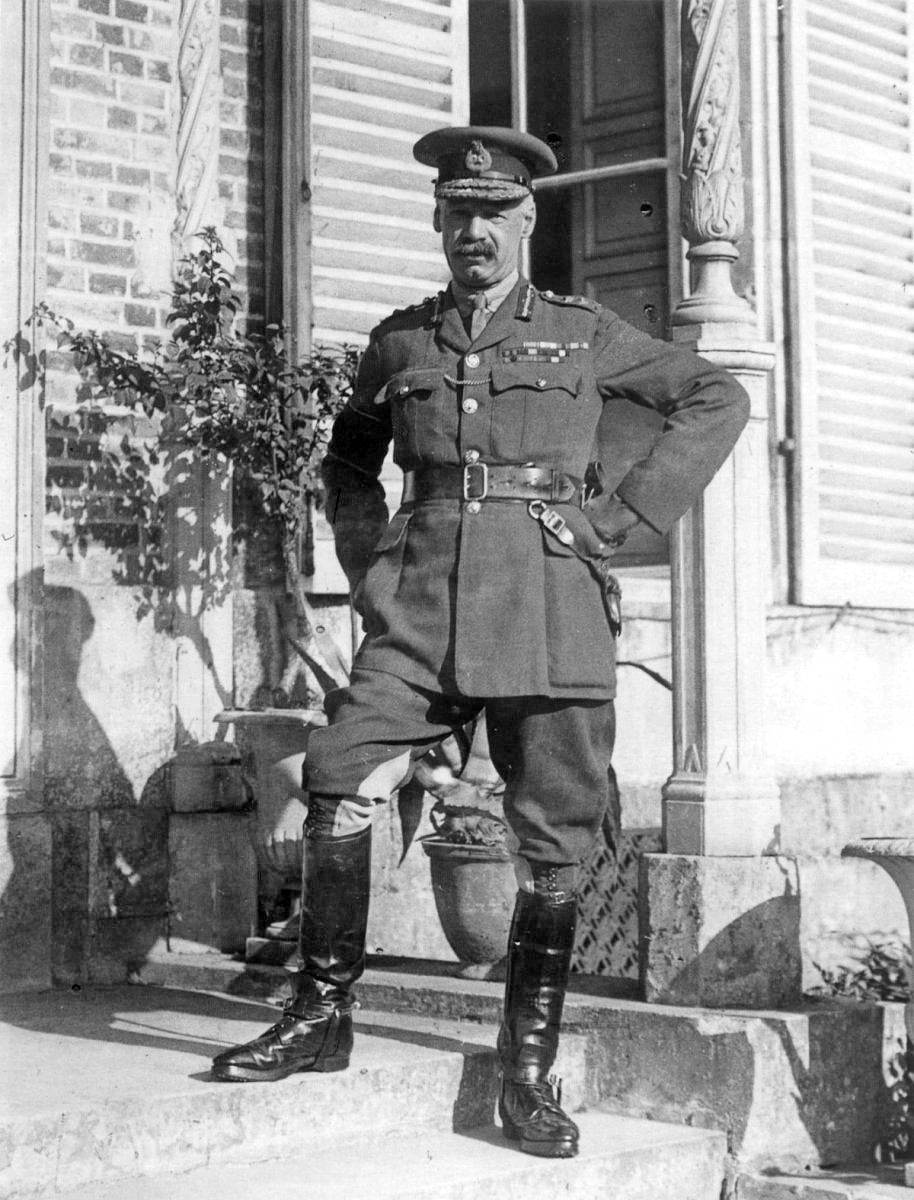
General Sir Henry Rawlinson, Bt, at Fourth Army HQ, Querrieu Château, July 1916.

The Somme offensive was launched on 1 July 1916. In English writing, attention has been paid to the first day, a British disaster for three of the five attacking corps, although the battle lasted 141 days against two German armies. On 1 July, British forces were repulsed by the Germans along most of the front north of the Albert–Bapaume road, suffering 57,000 casualties. The worst defeats were in front of Pozières and Thiepval. By the afternoon Rawlinson was aware of much of the disaster but not of the casualties. By 3 July he knew 8,000 prisoners had been taken. On the Allied right, the British and French had more success. Here they had a better fire plan but limited objectives as a flank guard to a main advance further north. This was more in keeping with Rawlinson's idea of "bite and hold". There is no documentary evidence that the corps commander on the right (southern) British flank, Lieutenant General Walter Congreve, commanding XIII Corps, telephoned Rawlinson to ask permission to advance beyond his set objectives or to send in cavalry.

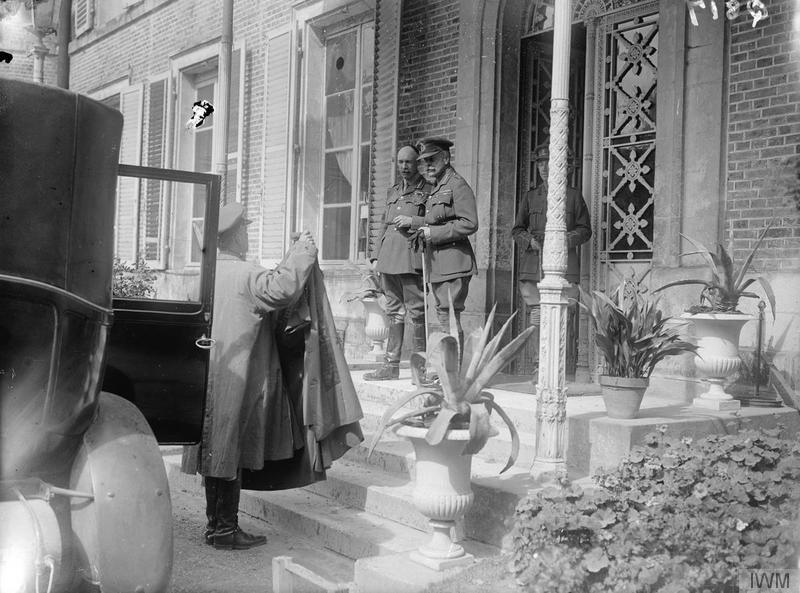
General Sir Douglas Haig, C-in-C of the BEF, with General Sir Henry Rawlinson, Bt, the GOC-in-C of the Fourth Army of the BEF, at the latter's army headquarters at Querrieu, France, July 1916.

The principal causes of the defeat in the north were the skill of German defenders, the siting of their defences and the failure of the long and heavy preliminary artillery bombardment to destroy the German barbed wire and trenches, except in the southern sector where French heavy artillery assisted. It is not true that heavily laden British infantry were required to advance at a slow walk. The researches of the historians Robin Prior and Trevor Wilson have shown that the majority of battalions were out in No Man's Land before whistles blew. This was of no avail, except in the south, against skilful placing of German machine guns in enfilade positions and German artillery fire falling on British trenches to prevent reinforcements reaching the 36th (Ulster) Division, who had penetrated the German position north of Thiepval. Rawlinson's 'Tactical Notes', initially drafted by his chief of staff Archie Montgomery, were not prescriptive, giving initiative to battalion commanders to choose their formations.

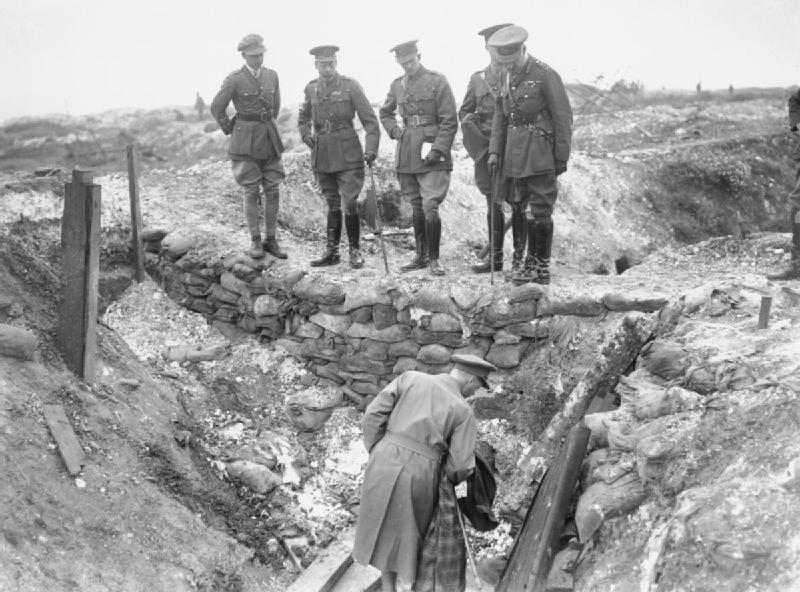
Lieutenant-general Walter Congreve inspecting captured German trenches near Fricourt along with King George V, the Prince of Wales, General Sir Henry Rawlinson and Lieutenant Harding of the Royal Engineers in 1916.

Haig told Rawlinson to exploit success in the south. Fourth Army fought its way forward towards the second German line atop the Bazentin Ridge. At first light on 14 July, following a night approach march, a two-day preparatory bombardment of over 375,000 shells and a five-minute intensive hurricane bombardment, the leading British attackers, some within 100 yd (91 m) of enemy lines attacked the German position. Nearly all first line objectives were taken. The Germans suffered 2,200 casualties and the British took 1,400 prisoners. The British were unable to exploit this success and a long period of difficult fighting followed. The Germans made excellent use of the woods on the battlefield, turning each into a strongpoint. Rawlinson mainly failed to intervene and coordinate attacks until late August and early September, when he massed guns and men, enabling brigades of the 16th (Irish) Division to capture Guillemont village. By late September, superior British artillery and better tactics enabled the British to achieve a striking success in the Battle of Morval. At the start of October, the rain and the temperature fell and the battlefield turned into a quagmire. The only late success was gained by the Fifth Army (formerly Reserve Army, commanded by Lieutenant General Hubert Gough) capturing Beaumont Hamel.

The results of the Somme remain in dispute; casualties on both sides were immense. There is evidence that the German Army suffered enormous damage from an increasingly effective British artillery aided by French and British air superiority over the battlefield. "The unprecedented English artillery fire on the Somme is filling the hospitals more than ever" wrote the wife of a German aristocrat. Rawlinson contributed to this in his awareness of guns and aircraft and his planning aided by his chief of staff for attacks on 14 July and 25 September. On and before 1 July and during most of August he has been criticised for giving insufficient direction and did not consistently assert control over subordinate commanders. There was cautious British optimism at the end of the Battle and General Sir Henry Wilson felt that Haig could defeat Germany in 1917 by fighting "two Sommes at once", but that he should be told how much manpower was available and told to plan accordingly.

In January 1917, Rawlinson was promoted to permanent general "for distinguished service in the field". For a period in 1917–18, he also commanded the Second Army. In February 1918 he was appointed British Permanent Military Representative to the inter-Allied Supreme War Council at Versailles.

=== Battles of 1918 ===
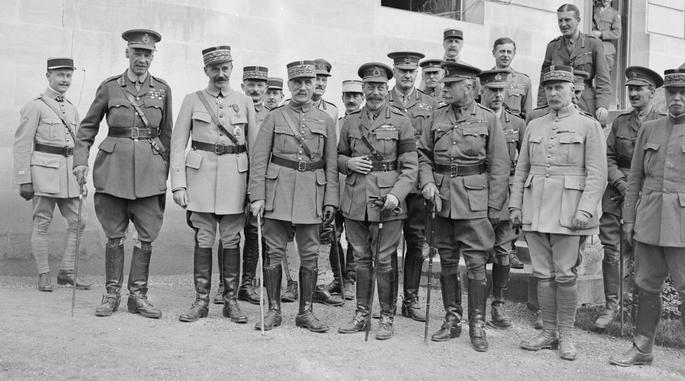
Group of senior British and French officers at Rawlinson's Fourth Army Headquarters at Flixecourt, France, during King George V's visit, 12 August 1918. Rawlinson is standing on the extreme left, next to Émile Fayolle.

On 28 March 1918, Rawlinson took over Fifth Army from Hubert Gough, sacked in the wake of the German March offensive, Operation Michael; his Fourth Army Staff joined him and Fifth Army became Fourth Army on 2 April. By this time the German Army's offensive had been checked, and the Allies were preparing a counter-offensive. Following the success of the Australian attack at Le Hamel on 4 July, Rawlinson proposed to Haig, now a field marshal, a larger attack, designed to force the Germans back from the city of Amiens and further to damage the German Army's weakening morale. At lunch on 16 July Haig agreed, saying he had already proposed such an operation. Rawlinson had learned from his experiences on the Somme:

The immeasurable superiority of the planning for 8 August 1918 over that for 1 July 1916 testified to the distance the BEF had travelled in the interim."

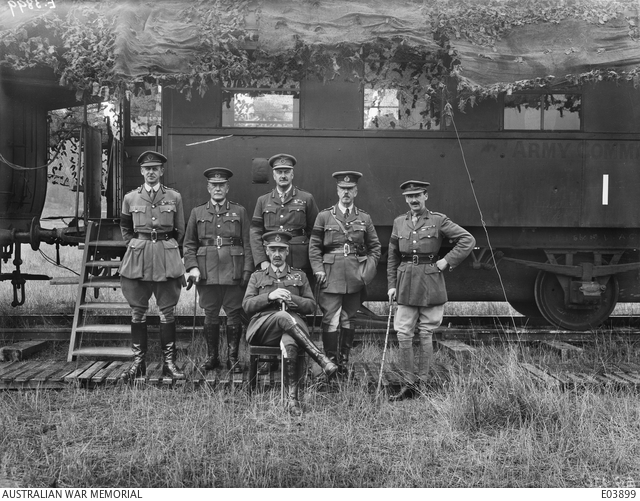
General Rawlinson with senior members of his staff in front of Fourth Army Advanced Headquarters, a camouflaged railway train, at Montigny Farm, near Peronne, France, October 1918.

The attack was to be on a relatively narrow front, with no prior bombardment and limited objectives. To ensure a breakthrough, Haig gave Rawlinson command of virtually the whole British armoured forces. By this stage of the war British manpower was severely depleted, and to achieve the breakthrough, the Fourth Army comprised four Canadian, five Australian, five British and two American divisions.

The Allies achieved surprise and the Battle of Amiens proved a striking success. On 8 August, described by General Erich Ludendorff as "the black day of the German Army", the Allies took 12,000 prisoners and captured 450 guns. The German and Allied commands were struck by the collapse in German morale and the high number of Germans surrendering without a fight. The Allies were still cautious about pressing their advantage too far and on 11 August Rawlinson advised Haig to halt the offensive.

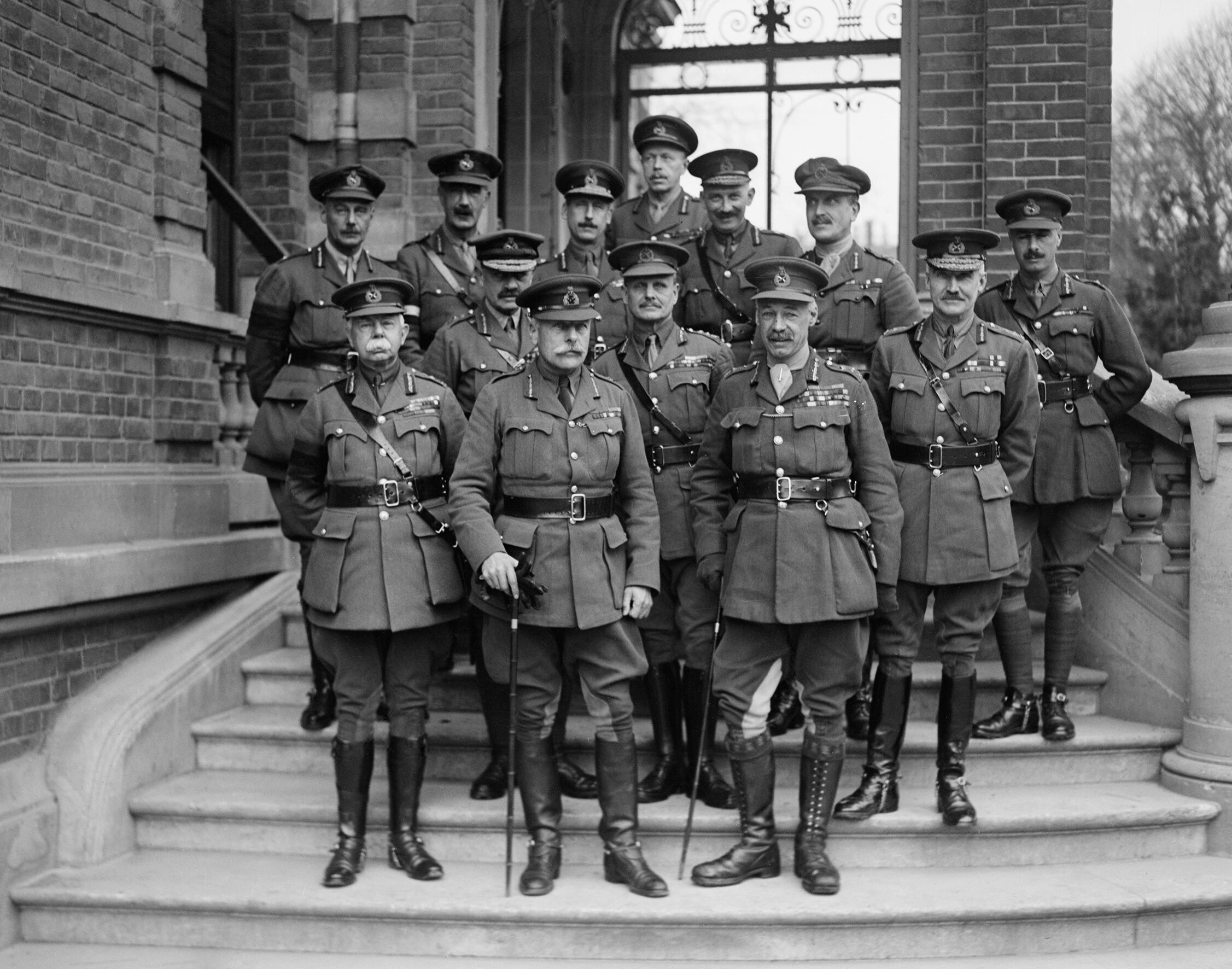
Field Marshal Sir Douglas Haig (centre front) with his senior commanders and staff officers at Cambrai, France, 11 November 1918. Stood in the front row, to Haig's left, is General Sir Henry Rawlinson.

In September, again commanding a mixed force of British, Australian and American divisions, Rawlinson participated in the breaking of the Hindenburg Line, a major part of the Hundred Days Offensive. Initial planning was by Lieutenant General Sir John Monash, the Australian Corps commander, but Rawlinson broadened the front and gave him more tanks. The Allied attack was preceded by a massive artillery bombardment. Allied success was most striking in the centre where the 46th (North Midland) Division, part of Rawlinson's IX Corps, crossed the St Quentin Canal and stormed trenches beyond, advancing up to 3 mi (4.8 km) and taking over 5,300 prisoners. The Fourth Army's advance continued in the Battles of the Selle and the Sambre and Oise Canal. In the Hundred Days, the Fourth Army had gained 85 mi (137 km), taking 80,000 prisoners and 1,100 guns.

The Allied advances continued until the Armistice of 11 November 1918, which brought an end to the fighting on the Western Front.

== Later life ==
=== Post-war activities ===
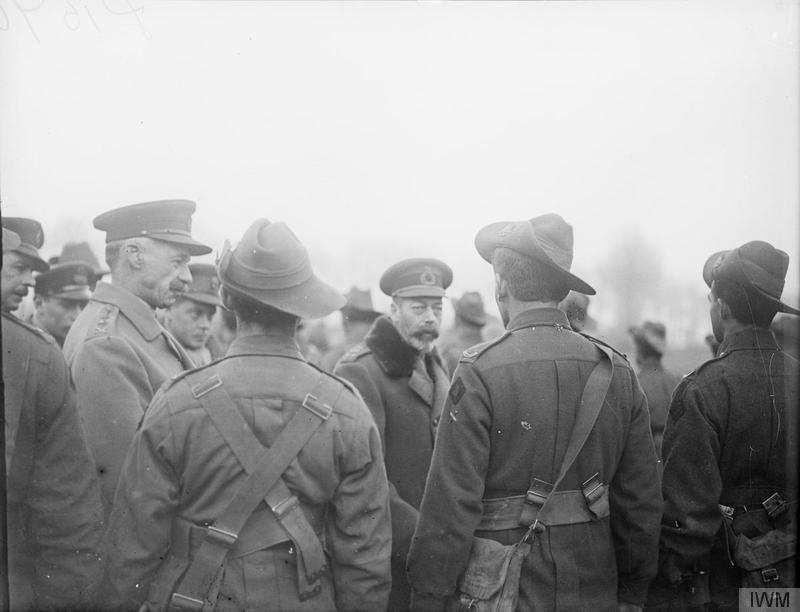
King George V (centre) with Edward, Prince of Wales and General Rawlinson inspecting the 2nd Australian Division, 1 December 1918.

Rawlinson was bestowed with many honours in reward for his role in the First World War. He was made a Knight Grand Cross of the Royal Victorian Order in 1917 and appointed a Knight Commander of the Order of St Michael and St George 1918. In August 1919 Parliament passed a vote of thanks to him for his military service, and awarded him the sum of £30,000 from the Exchequer. In 1919, he was raised to the peerage as Baron Rawlinson of Trent in the County of Dorset, and appointed a Knight Grand Cross of the Order of the Bath.

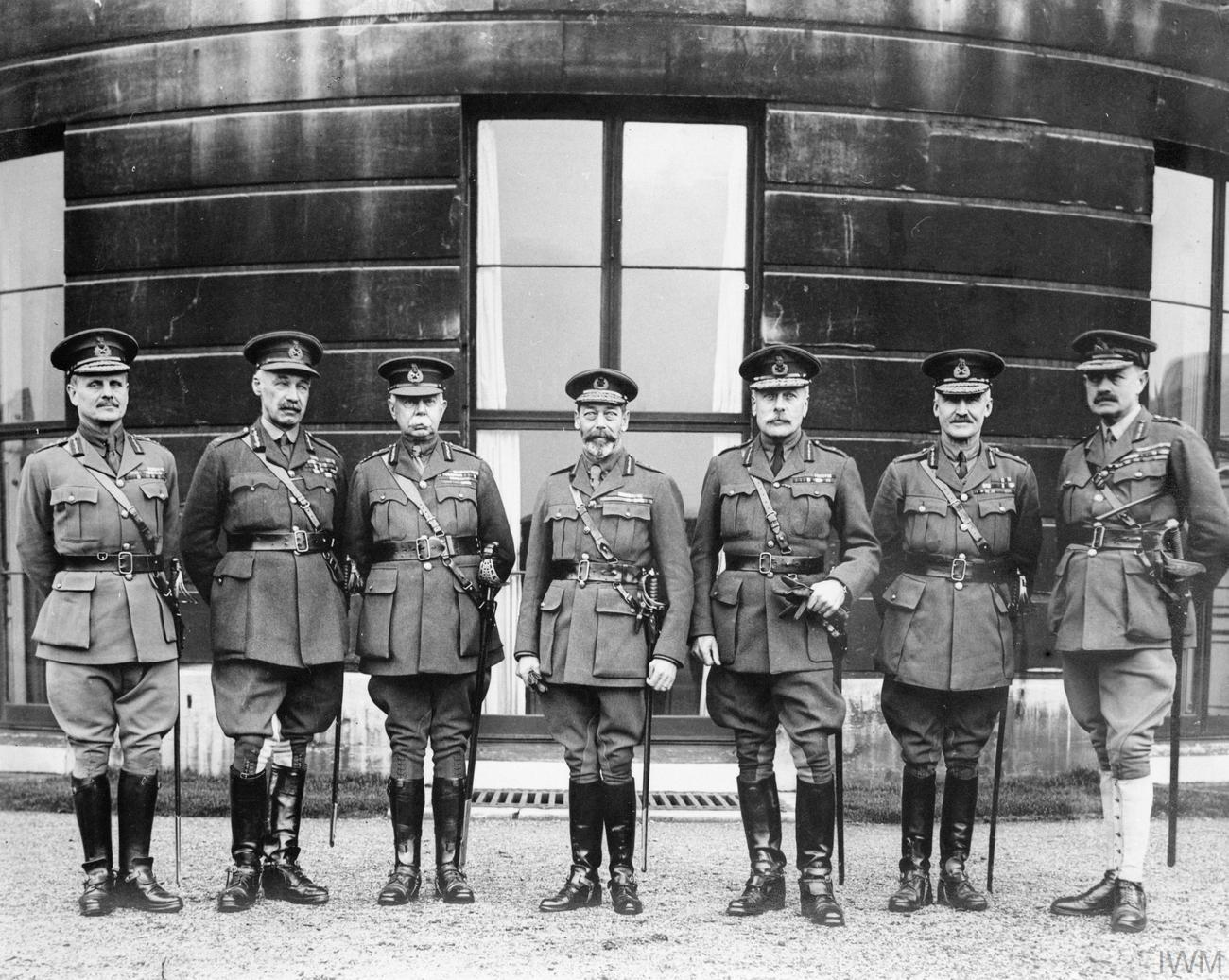
King George V (centre) with his senior commanders at Buckingham Palace, 19 December 1918. From left to right: William Birdwood, Henry Rawlinson, Herbert Plumer, George V, Douglas Haig, Henry Horne, Julian Byng.

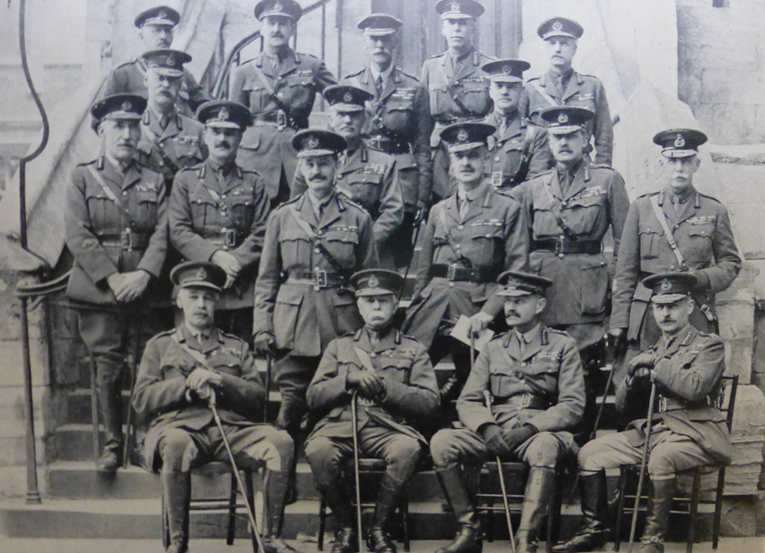
Eighteen Old Etonian generals revisit Eton, May 1919. General Rawlinson is sat in the front row on the extreme left.

Rawlinson was again called on to organise an evacuation, this time of the Allied forces that had been sent to Russia to intervene in the Russian Civil War. In November 1919, after returning to Britain, he succeeded General Sir Archibald Murray as general officer commanding-in-chief (GOC-in-C) of Aldershot Command.

=== Indian Command ===
In 1920, Rawlinson was made Commander-in-Chief, India. Winston Churchill as Secretary of State for War was instrumental in securing his appointment, over-riding a tradition that the post alternated between officers from the British and Indian Armies. He told Lloyd George that the post should go to the best qualified officer and that his military advisors "entirely supported my view that the best appointment we could make would be that of General Lord Rawlinson". He held the post until his death. He faced severe challenges. Brigadier Reginald Dyer's ordering his men to shoot at a crowd at Amritsar, killing 387 unarmed Indians, left a deep legacy of bitterness. The Third Anglo-Afghan War had ended, but there was continued fighting in Waziristan. A hugely expanded army faced postwar demobilisation and continued cost of modernisation. The new commander-in-chief was expected to introduce a measure of "Indianisation", giving commissions to Indians. Under the system of Diarchy, Indians, generally opposed to military expenditure, took a share in government and Rawlinson would have to justify army budgets. The Malabar rebellion of 1921 brought widespread disorder. When Gandhi launched the movement of non-cooperation with the British on 1 August 1920, he wished to avoid popular violence, but in 1922 the campaign degenerated: a crowd attacked a police station at Chauri Chaura, set fire to the building and 22 or 23 policemen were burnt to death or hacked down by the crowd. Gandhi cancelled the campaign, but he and other leaders of the resistance were arrested. Rawlinson certainly began his command believing that the Army would have to maintain order. On 15 July, he complained that:

Unless we, as a government, are prepared to act vigorously and take strong measures to combat the insidious propaganda of the extremists we are bound to have something very like rebellion in India before long... You say what you like about not holding India by the sword, but you have held it by the sword for 100 years and when you give up the sword you will be turned out. You must keep the sword ready to hand and in case of trouble or rebellion use it relentlessly. Montagu calls it terrorism, so it is and in dealing with natives of all classes you have to use terrorism whether you like it or not.

John Newsinger argues that "there is no doubt that the great majority of the British in India, soldiers, officials, civilians, agreed with Rawlinson on this. A few months later he noted in his journal that he "was determined to fight for the white community against any black sedition or rebellion", and, if necessary, "be the next Dyer". Nonetheless, with Gandhi temporarily behind bars and increasing economic stability as the 1920s advanced, Rawlinson had the scope to reduce the Army's strength, modernise its equipment and work closely with Viceroys Frederic Thesiger, 1st Viscount Chelmsford and Rufus Isaacs, 1st Marquess of Reading to try to make diarchy a success. In Waziristan, the British and Indian Field Force backed by aircraft put an end to the fighting, built roads and established a brigade base at Razmak. Rawlinson announced a scheme of "Indianisation" to the Central Legislative Assembly on 17 February 1923. Its aim, he said, was to "give Indians a fair opportunity of providing that units officered by Indians will be efficient in every way". The Prince of Wales' Royal Indian Military College was founded at Dehra Dun in 1922, run on English public school lines, to encourage potential officer candidates.

In January 1924, Rawlinson was appointed a Knight Grand Commander of the Order of the Star of India. By the end of his Indian command, he had reduced the Indian army in numbers and cost, but improved firepower, mobility and training. In financial matters he had been hugely helped by Sir Bhupendra Nath Mitra, who had financial details "at his finger's ends". He had been appointed to succeed Rudolph Lambart, 10th Earl of Cavan as Chief of the Imperial General Staff when he left India.

== Death ==
Rawlinson died on 28 March 1925 at the age of 61 at Delhi in India, after a medical operation for a stomach ailment, although not long before the operation he had played polo and cricket and seemed fit and well. His biographer, Rodney Atwood, describes it as follows:

Towards the end of March, he was taken ill. His surgeon diagnosed appendicitis, but other medical advice recommended against surgery in view of his fitness and age. Several days of increasing discomfort led him to agree to surgery at the Hindu Rao Hospital in New Delhi on 24 March. Surgeons repaired a strangulated intestine. Inexplicably, after a brief rally he weakened and died in the early hours of 28 March. He was sixty-one.

His body was carried back to England on the SS Assaye, which was met on reaching the English Channel by a Royal Navy destroyer, onto which the coffin was transferred, then carried into Portsmouth Harbour, being met at the South Jetty by a military ceremonial receiving party. Rawlinson was buried in the chapel of St Michael and St George in the north transept of St Andrew's Church, Trent, in the county of Dorset.

== Personal life ==
Rawlinson was a gifted watercolour artist. In March 1920, he and Winston Churchill enjoyed a painting holiday together on the French estate of Hugh Grosvenor, 2nd Duke of Westminster. "The General paints in water colours and does it very well," wrote Churchill. "With all my enormous paraphernalia, I have produced very indifferent results here."

He married Meredyth Sophia Frances Kennard (1861–1931) at St Paul's Church, Knightsbridge, London on 5 November 1890, the marriage producing no children. On Henry Rawlinson's death the baronetcy passed to his brother Alfred Rawlinson.

== Honours ==
=== British ===
- Knight Grand Cross of the Order of the Bath (GCB) – 1 January 1919 (KCB: 18 February 1915; CB: 19 April 1901)
- Knight Grand Commander of the Order of the Star of India (GCSI) – 1 January 1924
- Knight Grand Cross of the Royal Victorian Order (GCVO) - 14 July 1917 (KCVO: 15 August 1916; CVO: 30 June 1905)
- Knight Commander of the Order of St. Michael and St. George (KCMG) – 1 January 1918
- Baron Rawlinson, of Trent in the County of Dorset – 31 October 1919

=== Other ===
- Grand Officer of the Legion of Honour of France – 24 February 1916
- Order of Danilo, 1st Class of the Kingdom of Montenegro – 31 October 1916
- Obilitch Medal in Gold of the Kingdom of Montenegro – 21 April 1917
- Order of St. George, 4th Class of the Russian Empire – 1 June 1917
- Grand Officer of the Order of Leopold of Belgium – 26 July 1917
- Croix de Guerre of Belgium – 11 March 1918
- Croix de Guerre of France – 11 March 1919
- Army Distinguished Service Medal of the United States – 12 July 1919

== Bibliography ==
- Atwood, Rodney (2018). General Lord Rawlinson: From Tragedy to Triumph. Bloomsbury Academic. ISBN 978-1-4742-4698-9.
- Beckett, Ian F. W.; Corvi, Steven J. (2006). Haig's Generals. Barnsley: Pen & Sword Military. ISBN 978-1-84415-169-1.
- Jacobsen, Mark ed., (2002) Rawlinson in India. Publications of the Army Records Society Vol 19., Sutton Publishing, Stroud, Glos.
- Jeffery, Keith (2006). Field Marshal Sir Henry Wilson: A Political Soldier. Oxford University Press. ISBN 978-0-19-820358-2.
- Maurice, Major-general Sir Frederick (1928), The Life of General Lord Rawlinson of Trent G.C.B., G.C.V.O., G.C.S.I., K.C.M.G.: From His Journals and Letters Cassell, OCLC 924000844
- Middlebrook, Martin (1971). The First Day on the Somme. Allen Lane. ISBN 0-14-139071-9.
- Neillands, Robin (1999). The Great War Generals on the Western Front 1914–1918. Robinson, 1999. ISBN 1841190632.
- Persico, Joseph E. (2005). 11th Month, 11th Day, 11th Hour (illustrated, reprint ed.). London: Random House. ISBN 978-0-09-944539-5. OCLC 224671506.
- Prior, Robin; Wilson, Trevor (2004). Command on the Western Front: The Military Career of Sir Henry Rawlinson 1914–1918. ISBN 1-84415-103-4.
- Rawlinson, A. (1923) Adventures in the Near East, 1918–1922 Andrew Melrose, OCLC 369625881
- Stevenson, David (2011). With Our Backs to the Wall: Victory and Defeat in 1918. Allen Lane. ISBN 978-0141020792.
- Yockelson, Mitchell A. (2008). Borrowed Soldiers: Americans under British Command, 1918. Foreword by John S. D. Eisenhower. University of Oklahoma Press. ISBN 978-0-8061-3919-7.

Military offices
Preceded by Herbert Miles	Commandant of the Staff College, Camberley; 1903–1906	Succeeded by Henry Wilson
Preceded by William Franklyn	GOC 3rd Division; 1910–1914	Succeeded by Hubert Hamilton
Preceded by Thomas Snow	GOC 4th Division; September–October 1914	Succeeded by Henry Wilson
New post	GOC IV Corps; October 1914–December 1915	Succeeded by Sir Henry Wilson
Preceded by Sir Douglas Haig	GOC First Army; December 1915–February 1916	Succeeded by Sir Charles Monro
New post	GOC Fourth Army; February 1916–November 1917	Position abolished
Preceded by Sir Herbert Plumer	GOC Second Army (renamed Fourth Army, December 1917); November 1917–February 1918	Succeeded by Sir William Birdwood
Preceded by Sir Hubert Gough	GOC Fifth Army; March 1918–March 1919	Succeeded by Sir Henry Rawlinson as GOC Fourth Army
Preceded by Sir Archibald Murray	GOC-in-C Aldershot Command; 1919–1920	Succeeded by The Earl of Cavan
Preceded by Sir Charles Monro	C-in-C India; 1920–1925	Succeeded by Sir Claud Jacob
Baronetage of the United Kingdom
Preceded by Henry Rawlinson	Baronet (of North Walsham); 1895–1925	Succeeded by Alfred Rawlinson
Peerage of the United Kingdom
New creation	Baron Rawlinson; 1919–1925	Extinct
