= Rawlinson baronets =

Baronetcy in the Baronetage of the United Kingdom

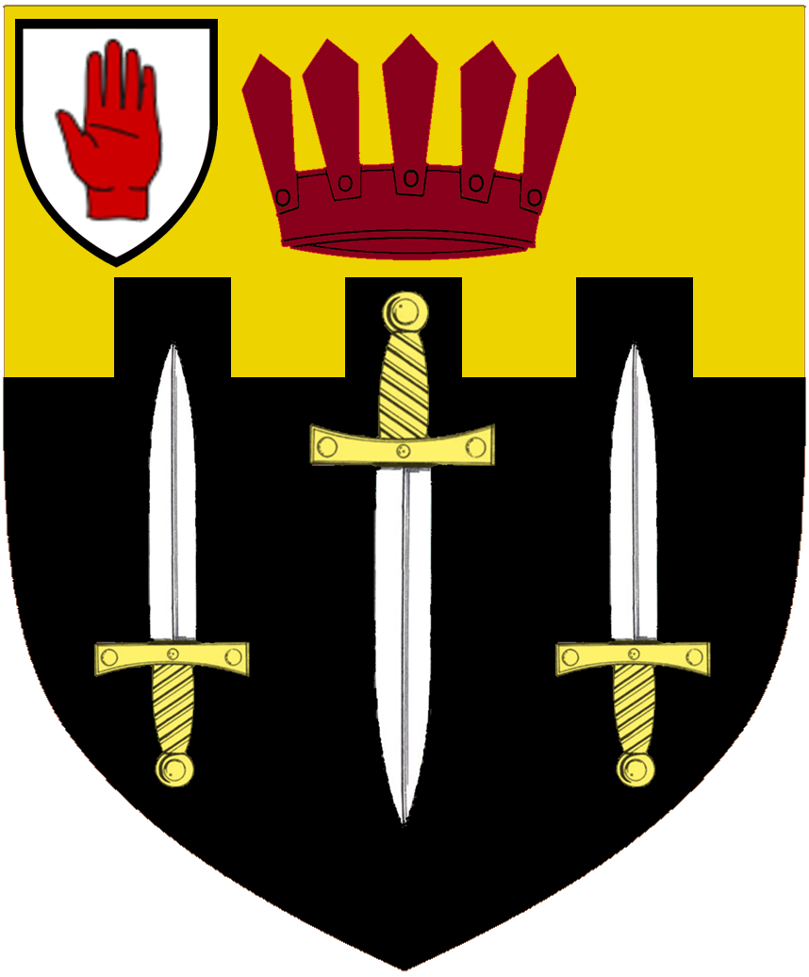
Arms of the Rawlinson baronets

The Rawlinson baronetcy, of North Walsham in the County of Norfolk, is a title in the Baronetage of the United Kingdom. It was created on 7 February 1891 for the orientalist, archaeologist and politician Henry Rawlinson. He was Member of Parliament for Reigate during 1858, and for Frome from 1865 to 1868.

His son the 2nd Baronet was a General in the British Army. On 6 October 1919 he was raised to the Peerage of the United Kingdom as Baron Rawlinson, of Trent in the County of Dorset. On his death on 26 March 1925 the barony became extinct, while the baronetcy passed to his younger brother, the 3rd Baronet.

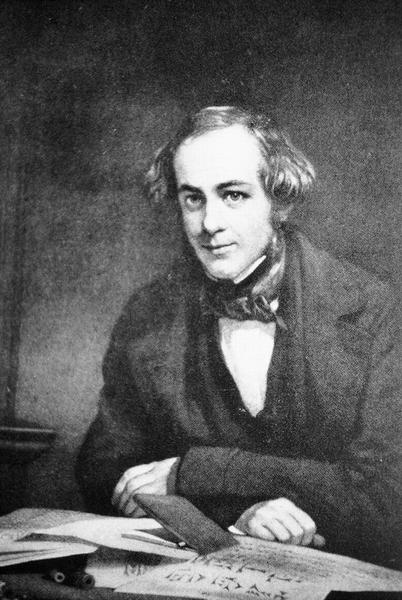
Sir Henry Rawlinson, 1st Baronet

== Rawlinson baronets, of North Walsham (1891) ==
- Sir Henry Creswicke Rawlinson, 1st Baronet (1810–1895)
- Sir Henry Seymour Rawlinson, 2nd Baronet (1864–1925) (created Baron Rawlinson in 1919)

== Barons Rawlinson (1919) ==
- Henry Seymour Rawlinson, 1st Baron Rawlinson (1864–1925)

== Rawlinson baronets, of North Walsham (1891; reverted) ==
- Sir Alfred Rawlinson, 3rd Baronet (1867–1934)
- Sir (Alfred) Frederick Rawlinson, 4th Baronet (1900–1969)
- Sir Anthony Henry John Rawlinson, 5th Baronet (1936–2023)
- Sir Alexander Noel Rawlinson, 6th Baronet (born 1964)

The heir presumptive is the present holder's half-brother Rupert Seymour Rawlinson (born 1970).

Baronetage of the United Kingdom
Preceded by Robinson baronets	Rawlinson baronets of North Walsham; 7 February 1891	Succeeded by Brooks baronets
