= Sir Alfred Rawlinson, 3rd Baronet =

British intelligence officer and sportsman

Sir Alfred Rawlinson, Bt
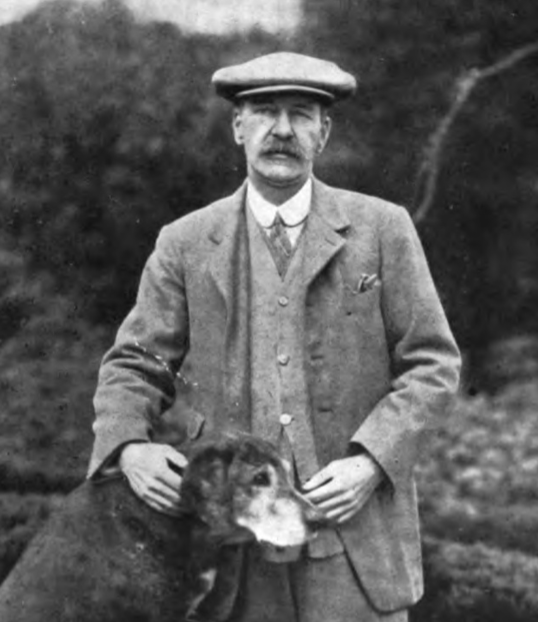
- Alfred Rawlinson with dog George in 1924.
- Born: 17 January 1867
- Died: 1 June 1934 (aged 67)
- Military career
- Branch: British army, Royal Naval Reserve
- Rank: Colonel
- Units: 17th Lancers, Royal Naval Air Service, Armoured Car Section, Royal Garrison Artillery, Intelligence Corps
- Conflicts: World War I; Western Front; Battle of Aubers Ridge; German strategic bombing; Mesopotamian campaign; Turkish War of Independence
- Awards: Companion of the Order of St Michael and St George, Commander of the Most Excellent Order of the British Empire, Distinguished Service Order

Medal record

Men's polo

Representing a Mixed team

Olympic Games
Gold medal – first place	1900 Paris	Team competition

Colonel Sir Alfred "Toby" Rawlinson, 3rd Baronet, CMG CBE DSO (17 January 1867 – 1 June 1934) was an English soldier and intelligence officer, sportsman, pioneer motorist and aviator.

== Early life ==
Rawlinson was the second son of Major-general Sir Henry Creswicke Rawlinson, 1st Baronet, a soldier, diplomat and expert in Persian antiquities. His mother was Louisa Caroline Harcourt, a daughter of Henry Seymour one of the Tory MPs for Taunton. Two of his uncles, Henry Danby Seymour and Alfred Seymour, were also MPs. His older brother became General Henry Rawlinson, 1st Baron Rawlinson, who masterminded the Battle of Amiens and the Hundred Days Offensive that brought the fighting of the First World War to a close.

Rawlinson, known to family and friends as "Toby", was born on 17 January 1867 at the family home in Charles Street, Mayfair, in the West End of London. He was educated at Eton College and the Royal Military College, Sandhurst, after which he was commissioned as a 2nd lieutenant into the 17th Lancers.

== Sportsman ==
Rawlinson was a top-level polo player; he was in the winning teams for the inter-regimental tournament in India in 1889, the Hurlingham Champion Cup in 1896 and 1902, also the Ranelagh Open Cup, the All Ireland Open Cup and others. In the 1900 Summer Olympics in Paris, he was a member of the Foxhunters Hurlingham polo team which won the Olympic gold medal. He retired from the sport in 1911. Rawlinson was also a keen motor racing driver, resigning from the army to concentrate on the sport. He took part in the 1908 Isle of Man RAC Tourist Trophy ("TT") race, driving his Darracq into 7th place. (Note: Two other pioneer aviators, John Moore-Brabazon (Royal Aero Club Aviator's Certificate No. 1) and Arthur Edward George (Aviator's Certificate No. 19), took part in the 1908 I.O.M. TT, the former, driving a Métallurgique, having to retire after 6 laps due to a problem with an exhaust valve, the latter, driving a Darracq, taking third place and also recording the fastest lap time.)

Rawlinson learned to fly in France in a Farman aircraft, essentially teaching himself after he was unable to enrol for formal lessons. He surprised everyone by getting into the air at his first attempt and was considered a natural if reckless aviator. In 1909 he acquired the rights for constructing Farman aircraft in the UK and subsequently resigned as managing director of the Darracq Motor Company to concentrate on this new passion. On 5 April 1910 Rawlinson became only the third person in the United Kingdom to hold a Royal Aero Club aviator's certificate.

== France, 1914–15 ==
At the outbreak of the First World War in August 1914, Rawlinson was 47 and too old to be called up as a reservist. He therefore offered himself and his Hudson sports car to the Royal Automobile Club, who were assembling an "RAC Corps of Volunteer Motor Drivers". Rawlinson was one of twenty-five motorists selected to accompany the British Expeditionary Force to the continent to act as chauffeurs and dispatch carriers for the General Staff. He and the other drivers worked with the British Army in the first battles of the war, his car being adapted by the addition of a machine gun and flying a Union Jack. By October, he had been transferred to a staff position with IV Corps (which was commanded by his brother) and had been given the rank of colonel by Sir John French, despite having left the cavalry as a subaltern. His driving exploits were described in his Adventures on the Western Front, August, 1914 – June, 1915 (1925).

In the trench warfare that had developed, it became apparent that the British had nothing to match the German Minenwerfer. While an effective British weapon was in development, Rawlinson acquired 40 obsolete Coehorn mortars from the French army which became known as "Toby mortars" after him; they were first used in action at the Battle of Neuve Chapelle in March 1915. On 9 May 1915, Rawlinson was injured by a German heavy shell at the Battle of Aubers Ridge and returned to England. While recovering at home on 20 June, he was visited by a staff officer from the War Office with a message stating that commissions could not be issued in the field and that he could not consider himself a serving officer. Despite being "hurt to the very soul" by the manner of his dismissal, Rawlinson went straight to the Admiralty and volunteered his services.

== Air defence of London, 1915–17 ==
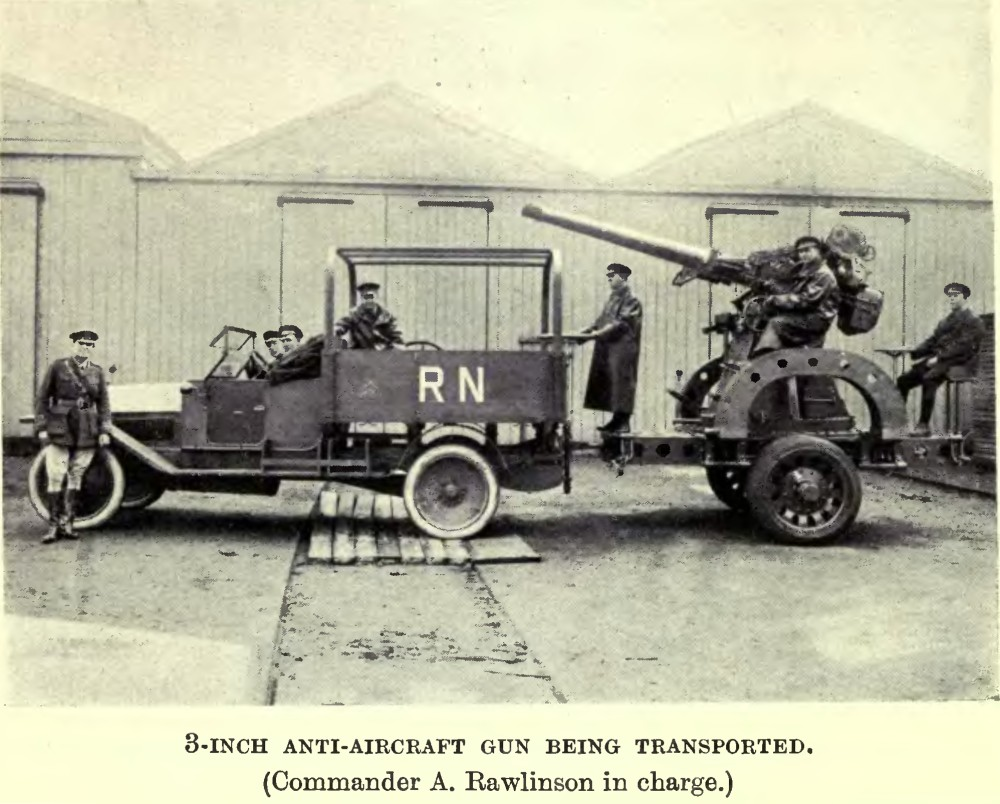
Rawlinson (extreme left) with one of the anti-aircraft guns of the Royal Naval Anti-Aircraft Mobile Brigade, a towed QF 3-inch 20 cwt.

On 20 June 1915, Rawlinson was appointed a lieutenant-commander in the Royal Naval Volunteer Reserve and tasked with raising a new squadron of the RNAS Armoured Car Section. However, in August, he was interviewed by Commodore Murray Sueter RN, who was the commander of London's anti-aircraft defences. Owing to previous experience in the air defence of Paris, Rawlinson was "invited", in his spare time, to suggest improvements to the weapons and ammunition in use, as they had proved ineffective in the first Zeppelin attacks on London in the previous weeks. In September, he was placed under the direct command of Admiral Sir Percy Scott, who had been ordered to establish the London Air Defence Area. Rawlinson was tasked with forming a mobile anti-aircraft battery, using picked men from his armoured car squadron. He set off at once for France, in the hope of obtaining an example of the lorry-mounted Autocanon de 75 mm 1913 anti-aircraft gun and returned to London with one within 72 hours. This weapon became the nucleus of the Royal Naval Anti-Aircraft Mobile Brigade, under Rawlinson's personal command; it was first used in action against a Zeppelin on 13 October at Moorgate in the City of London. Eventually, the brigade was armed with four French 75mms, two QF 3-inch 20 cwts, and eight QF 3 pounder Vickers with four powerful searchlights, all mounted on lorries. Operating from the stables at Kenwood House, the guns could be rushed to prepared positions around the capital at very short notice. When the army took over the air defence of London in February 1916, the RNVR continued to operate the mobile guns under Army command. In August 1916, the brigade relocated to Norfolk, with the intention of intercepting the Zeppelins as they crossed the coast. Throughout this time, Rawlinson was continually refining the techniques of anti-aircraft gunnery, and claimed to have pioneered the use of acoustic location in detecting aircraft hidden by cloud. In January 1917, the brigade moved to the coast of Essex to counter the threat from German aeroplanes. In May 1917, Rawlinson was offered command of the newly created Western Sub-Command of the London defences, which required a transfer back to the army, with the rank of lieutenant-colonel. His new command consisted of 19 gun and 36 searchlight positions. He commanded these assets during the heavy air raids of late 1917.

== Intelligence Corps ==
In January 1918, Rawlinson tendered his resignation and sought a post in pursuance of "an ardent desire to once more get a little closer to the enemy". In February, he obtained a transfer to the Intelligence Corps with the rank of colonel. Assignments include tours of duty in the Caucasus and Eastern Anatolia during 1918–1922. His mission was to guard the Tiflis-Baku railway, and to oversee the demobilizing of Turkish forces. Under Lionel Dunsterville, he was sent on a mission to the Mountainous Republic of the Northern Caucasus.

On his last assignment, to establish whether Turkey was obeying the armistice conditions, Rawlinson and his party were held prisoner in Erzurum by the Turkish authorities, placing the British Government in an awkward position, because his elder brother was a high-ranking military officer. He was eventually released in a prisoner exchange which included the so-called Malta Exiles, who were prosecuted for war crimes during World War I.

His book Adventures in the Near East (1923), chronicles the state of affairs during the armistice days at the end of World War I. In particular, he gives accounts of the landscape after the Russian withdrawal and the beginnings of the Turkish nationalist movement.

== Private life ==
On 25 June 1890, Alfred Rawlinson married Margarette Kennard, the 6th daughter of William Bunce Greenfield DL. They had four children; twins Alfred Frederick and Honour Louisa were born on 23 August 1900. Honour died aged 12. They had a second daughter, Irene Margarette (died 1974) and a third, Mary, who also died in infancy. Margarette Rawlinson died on 18 September 1907 aged about 49.

On 13 December 1913, Rawlinson married his second wife Jean Isabella Griffin Aitkin, an actress also known by her stage name of Jean Aylwin. They were divorced in 1924; the composer Hubert Bath was named as co-respondent in the case. The court heard that while she had been appearing in Polly, she had asked her husband to rent a flat for her opposite the theatre. When he went to visit her there, he encountered Mr Bath. On learning that his wife was too ill to come out, Rawlinson invited Bath out to lunch, who declined, claiming a prior engagement. Rawlinson returned to the flat later, where he again met Bath. When Bath went to ask Aylwin if she was well enough to receive her husband, Rawlinson heard her ask "Has he gone?" which aroused his suspicions about Bath's presence. Aylwin wrote to her husband afterwards, saying he was "quite wrong", and that Bath had been "a good friend". However, the housekeeper testified that Aylwin and Bath had often been alone together at the flat. The court found for Colonel Rawlinson and granted the divorce.

When Rawlinson's older brother died on 28 March 1925, he became the 3rd baronet, but did not inherit the peerage created for his brother, which became extinct.

Alfred Rawlinson died suddenly of natural causes at his flat in Clapham on 1 June 1934.

Baronetage of the United Kingdom
Preceded by Henry Rawlinson	Baronet (of North Walsham, Norfolk); 1925–1934	Succeeded by Alfred Rawlinson
