= Tillage Live =

British annual agricultural show

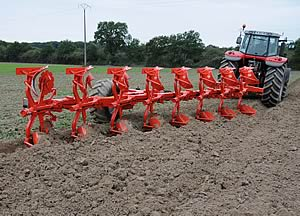
Kuhn Multi Leader at Tillage Live 2012

Tillage Live is the United Kingdom's largest national cultivations event (agricultural show). The show focuses on all aspects of crop establishment. It is organised each year by the Agricultural Engineers Association (AEA) on behalf of the industry. In 2012 the event attracted thousands of visitors to see around 55 exhibitors, including leading farm machinery manufacturers such as Claas, Pottinger, Lite-Trac, Opico and Kuhn, with 24 working demonstrations.

The event features agricultural equipment at work with the chance for operators to test machinery and learn about the new technologies developed by the manufacturers. It enables industry professionals to study options for cultivation and crop establishment techniques, soil management and gain CPD points for both BASIS and NRoSO (National Register of Sprayer Operators).

== History and Dates ==
Tillage Live show takes place annually in different locations around the UK. In 2011 it took place on Wednesday 14 September near Abingdon, Oxfordshire. In 2012 it took place on Wednesday 3 October 2012 in Westfield, Haddington, East Lothian.

== Show layout and structure ==
- Sprayer arena – where sprayer manufacturers showcase crop sprayers, which the attendees are allowed to drive;
- Central presentation area;
- Demonstration plots – where various agricultural machinery is demonstrated in action;
- "Knowledge trail":
  - Effective and economical weed control
  - Best practice on sprayer and contain cleaning
  - Best practice on pelleting
  - Focus on soil structure
  - Controlled traffic farming
  - Autosteer and guidance systems in practice

== See also ==
- Tillage
- Grassland & Muck
- LAMMA Show
- Cereals Event
- Royal Highland Show
