= Clarkson's Farm =

British television documentary series with Jeremy Clarkson

- Genre: Documentary; Reality television
- Directed by: Gavin Whitehead; Will Yapp; Kit Lynch-Robinson
- Starring: Jeremy Clarkson; Kaleb Cooper; Lisa Hogan; Charlie Ireland; Gerald Cooper; Kevin Harrison; Ellen Helliwell; Alan Townsend; Dilwyn Evans; Andy Cato; Annie Gray; Harriet Cowan; Hannah Bourne-Taylor
- Narrated by: Jeremy Clarkson
- Country of origin: United Kingdom
- Original language: English
- No. of series: 5
- No. of episodes: 40

Production
- Running time: 39–71 minutes
- Production companies: Expectation Entertainment; Con Dao Productions; Amazon MGM Studios

Original release
- Network: Amazon Prime Video
- Release: 11 June 2021 – present

Clarkson's Farm is a British television documentary series about Jeremy Clarkson and his farm in the Cotswolds. The series documents Clarkson's attempts at running a 1,000-acre (400 ha) farm near Chipping Norton in West Oxfordshire. Described by Clarkson as "genuine reality television", the series has received positive reviews and has been praised for raising public awareness of the British farming industry on the international stage.

The first series premiered on Amazon Prime Video on 11 June 2021. The second series, which premiered on 10 February 2023, became the most-watched Prime Video original series in the UK when it released. The third, fourth, and fifth series premiered on 3 May 2024, 23 May 2025, and 3 June 2026, respectively. In January 2026, it was renewed for a sixth series.

== Diddly Squat Farm ==
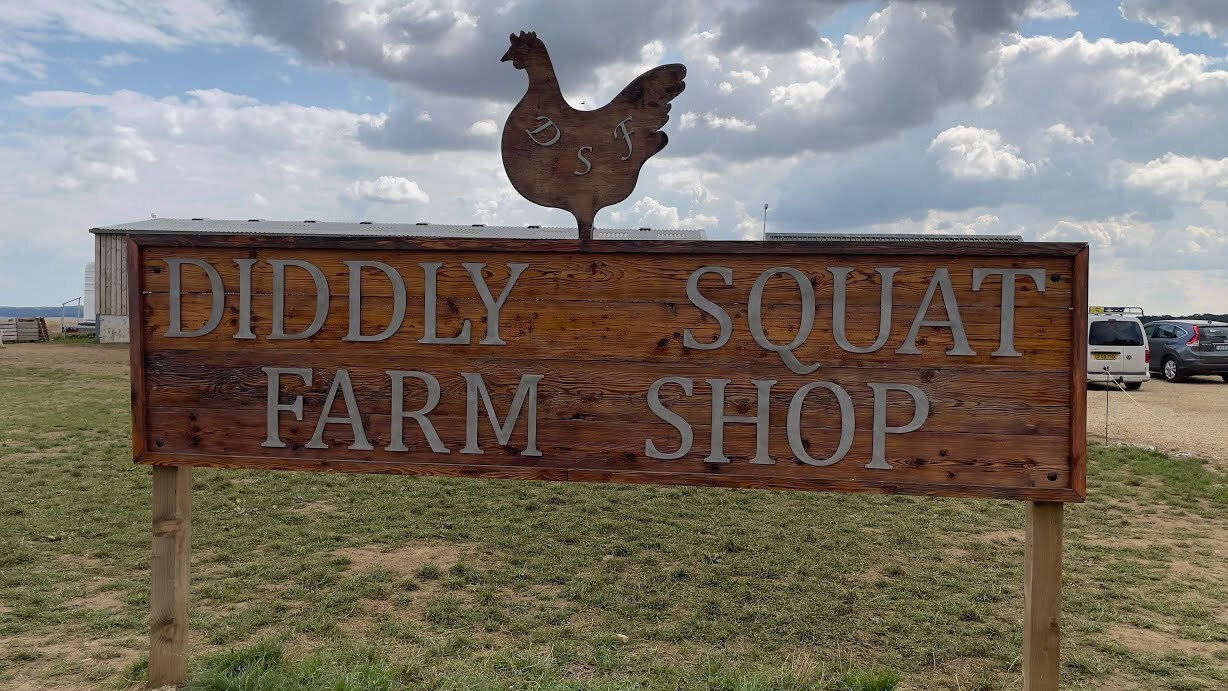
Sign for Diddly Squat Farm

The farm was formerly part of the Sarsden estate in Oxfordshire. Jeremy Clarkson bought about a thousand acres (400 ha) in 2008, including Curdle Hill Farm. The fields were mostly arable, growing a rotation of barley, rapeseed and wheat. These were farmed on a contract basis by a local villager until his retirement in 2019. Clarkson then decided to attempt the challenge of farming the land himself.

The farm was renamed Diddly Squat by Clarkson to indicate its lack of productivity.

== Cast ==
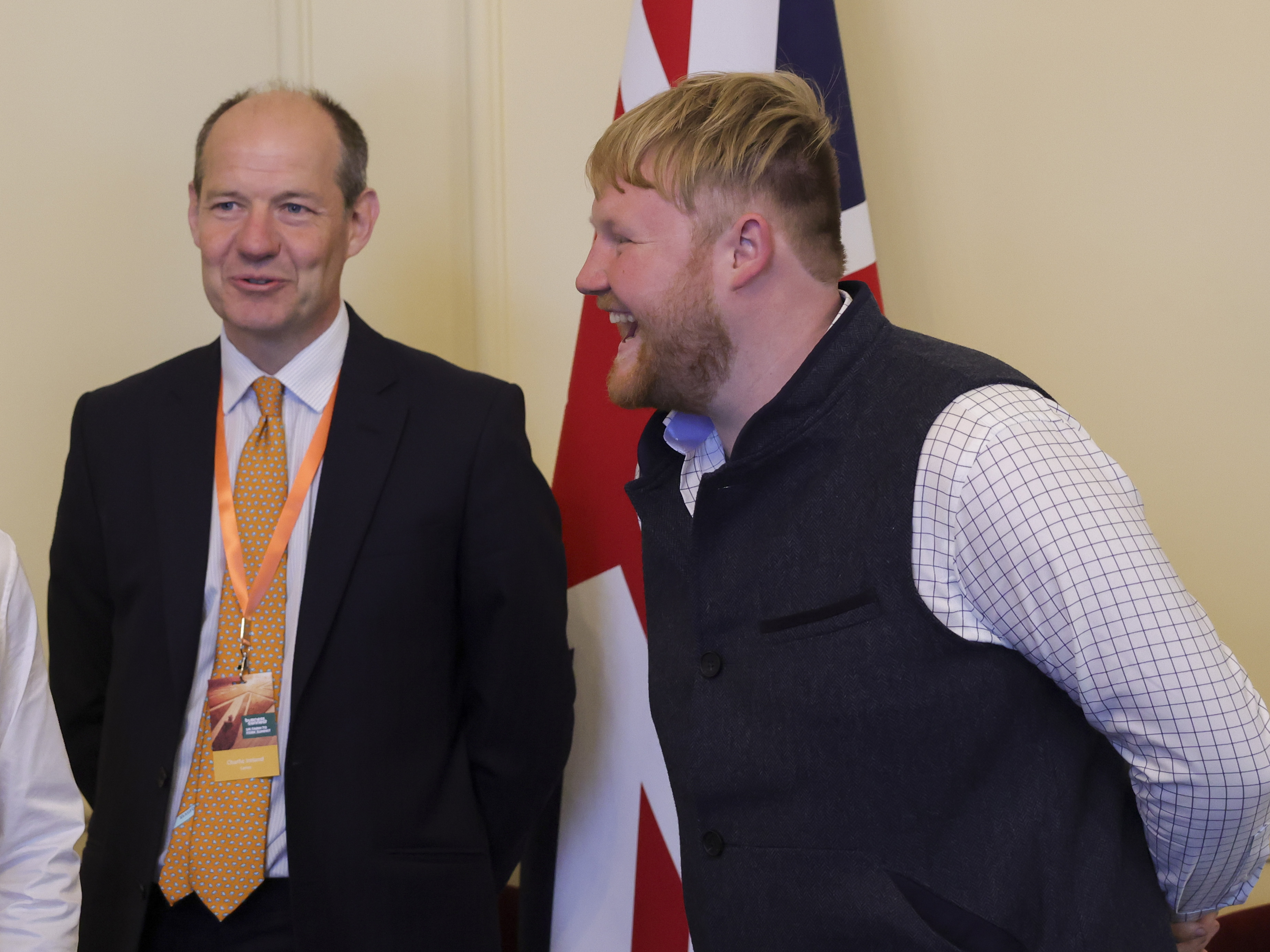
Charlie Ireland (left) and Kaleb Cooper (right) have appeared in every series.

=== Main cast ===
- Jeremy Clarkson: a motoring journalist, television presenter, and author who became famous on Top Gear, its 2002 revival, and The Grand Tour. He is the owner of Diddly Squat Farm and also acts as the narrator of the series.
- Kaleb Cooper: a young farm worker born in Chipping Norton in 1998. Cooper farms on his own account in Heythrop, but was engaged by Clarkson to assist him and become the farm's manager. He has previous experience working on Clarkson's farm before Clarkson took over as the owner. He mainly advises Clarkson on the technical details of using farming equipment and helps with numerous general tasks; his amusement and frustration with Clarkson's incompetence is a running theme in the series. He has rarely left the village of Chadlington and its surrounding areas, with the furthest place he regularly travels to being Banbury. He has three children with his wife Taya. During the fourth series, he takes a leave of absence from the farm to tour around the country and present his one-man show, The World According to Kaleb.
- Lisa Hogan: a former actress and Clarkson's girlfriend who assists with the farm and runs the farm shop.
- Charles "Charlie" Ireland: sarcastically referred to by Clarkson as "Cheerful Charlie", Ireland is a professional agronomist and land agent who advises Clarkson on farm management. Originally working for Strutt & Parker, he understands the agricultural aspects of the crops, the complex details of government regulation, and the financial consequences. Rachael Sigee, writing for the i newspaper, described him as "chronically sensible … a stickler for the rules who delivers increasingly bad news with the politely firm manners of a parish vicar."
- Gerald Cooper: the farm's "head of security" and a specialist in the construction and maintenance of dry stone walls, which form 14 miles of boundaries on the farm. His conversations with Clarkson are amiable but often incomprehensible due to his strong West Country accent. He helps Clarkson harvest the farm's grain, which he has been doing for over fifty years. He is not closely related to Kaleb Cooper. During the third series, he was diagnosed with prostate cancer and took a leave of absence from working on the farm.
- Kevin Harrison (series 1; supporting series 5): the chairman of the National Sheep Association and a veteran sheep farmer who advises Clarkson on purchasing and later tending to his flock of North Country Mule sheep.
- Ellen Helliwell (series 1; supporting series 5): a shepherdess who Clarkson hires to tend his flock of sheep, which he acquired to graze his set-aside meadows. Her duties also include lambing and shearing.
- Alan Townsend (series 2–4; supporting series 1, 5): the head builder for various projects, including the farm shop, barns for the farm animals, the farm restaurant, and The Farmer's Dog pub.
- Dilwyn Evans (series 2, 5; supporting series 1, 3–4): a veterinarian who helps care for the farm's flock of sheep and later its cows and pigs. He performs various tasks, including checking the animals for diseases and assisting with their births.
- Andy Cato (series 3; supporting series 5): one-half of the electronic music duo Groove Armada and an organic crop farmer who convinces Clarkson to convert one of his fields for regenerative farming.
- Annie Gray (series 4–5; supporting series 3): the owner and head chef of a catering van that replaces the farm restaurant. She later relocates to outside Clarkson's pub.
- Harriet Cowan (series 4; supporting series 5): a full-time nurse and farmer from Derbyshire who Clarkson temporarily hires to replace Kaleb while the latter is on tour.
- Hannah Bourne-Taylor (series 5): a bird conservationist who helps Clarkson learn about the wild birds on his farmland.

=== Supporting cast ===
- Georgia Craig (series 1–2): a policy advisor from the National Farmers' Union who advises Clarkson.
- Jenny Ryan (series 1, 3): a veterinarian who inspects Clarkson's sheep for potential breeding and later helps care for his pregnant pigs.
- Thomas Haynes (series 1–3, 5): an environmental compliance inspector who investigates the farm's woodland areas and advises Clarkson to prevent him from breaking environmental laws.
- Kieron Cooper (series 1–3): Kaleb's brother, who assists him on occasion.
- Viktor Zaichenko (series 1–3): a Ukrainian beekeeper who sells honey bees to Clarkson and helps manage the farm's apiary.
- Simon Strong (series 1–4): a neighbouring grain farmer who rents a combine harvester to Clarkson every year for harvesting grain.
- Tim and Katy Coles (series 2–4): cow breeders who sell heifers and beef cattle to Clarkson and later rent him a bull. They later join Clarkson's farming co-operative.
- Paddy and Steph Bourn (series 2, 4): egg farmers who go by the nickname "Mr and Mrs Cacklebean", and sell chickens and chicken coops to Clarkson. They later join Clarkson's farming co-operative.
- Emma Ledbury (series 2, 4): a dairy farmer who provides the farm shop with milk products and lost half her herd of dairy cattle to bovine tuberculosis. She later joins Clarkson's farming co-operative.
- Vanessa and Andy Hartley (series 2–4): pig farmers who initially provide the farm shop with pork products and later advise Clarkson on caring for his pigs. They later join Clarkson's farming co-operative.
- Imogen Stanley (series 2, 4): a vegetable farmer who provides the farm shop with a range of produce. She later joins Clarkson's farming co-operative.
- Tomasz Bagienski (series 2, 5): a chilli farmer who helps Clarkson create chilli jam.
- Richard "Rick" Keene (series 2–3): the owner of Hawkstone Brewery who creates Clarkson's Hawkstone Lager and Kaleb's Hawkstone Cider.
- Henry Lawrence (series 2–3): a butcher who runs an abattoir where Clarkson sends his cows and pigs.
- Jeremy Sealy (series 3, 5): a neighbouring sheep farmer who owns a sheep dog.
- Scott Watson (series 3–4): a chef who works with Annie in her catering van.
- Lucca Allen (series 3, 5): an Irish racing driver and cook who works at the farm shop and helps Clarkson with the production of nettle soup.
- Lizzie Dyer (series 3–5): a goat farmer who sells baby goats ("kids") to Clarkson.
- Mark Davies (series 4–5): a brewer at Hawkstone Brewery who helps Clarkson set up and manage his pub's bar.
- Nick Rowberry (series 4–5): an experienced chef who helps Clarkson set up and manage his pub's kitchen.
- David Hawes (series 4–5): a butcher who provides meat for the butcher's shop, Hops & Chops, located outside The Farmer's Dog.

== Episodes ==
Series	Episodes	Originally released	
Series	Episodes	First released	Last released
1	8	11 June 2021	
2	8	10 February 2023	
3	8	3 May 2024	10 May 2024
4	8	23 May 2025	6 June 2025
5	8	3 June 2026	17 June 2026

=== Series 1 (2021) ===
No. overall	No. in series	Title	Original release date
1	1	"Tractoring"	11 June 2021
Clarkson buys the equipment needed for arable farming – a tractor, cultivator, seed drill and other attachments – resulting in the total sum of £82,000. He spurns a traditional Massey Ferguson to buy a mighty Lamborghini R8.270 costing £40,000 (second hand), but finds that this is too large and complex for him to master easily. He tries to innovate but Kaleb (who he hires to help run the farm) scolds him about the results – irregular tramlines. Meanwhile, their cultivation and planting schedule is interrupted by torrential rain.
2	2	"Sheeping"	11 June 2021
The farm has 300 acres which are set aside from crop farming. The DEFRA subsidy scheme requires these meadows to be mown annually, so Clarkson decides to get a herd of sheep. He buys 78 North Country Mules at auction and finds that they are difficult to control, even with an electric fence and barking drone. After trouble with lameness and the complexity of breeding with his rams (which he names Leonardo and Wayne) he recruits Ellen to be the farm's shepherd.
3	3	"Shopping"	11 June 2021
Clarkson sets up a farm shop to sell farm produce. This constitutes potatoes, which need to be sold quickly, because otherwise they would rot. Clarkson uses social media to advertise the shop, resulting in a large number of customers.
4	4	"Wilding"	11 June 2021
Clarkson decides to leave portions of his farm for nature, a process called wilding. He uses an excavator to dig a pond and form a wetland area. He builds a dam on a nearby stream for water for the pond and adds 250 brown trout. He installs bird boxes for owls. He obtains four beehives for honey for the farm shop and to pollinate his crops.
5	5	"Pan (dem) icking"	11 June 2021
The COVID-19 pandemic hits the country. Farm workers are key workers and are able to keep working. The lambing season starts and Clarkson assists in the births, in which most of the births were successful; one died after being abandoned by its mother and the rest were stillbirths. Clarkson decides to plant vegetables in a field instead of barley as pubs are shut and he believes that beer, which barley is used to produce, will not be sold in the same quantities. He re-opens the farm shop to sell the remaining potatoes, but customers are scarce.
6	6	"Melting"	11 June 2021
A dry spell in April–May 2020 affects Clarkson's crops. He obtains water from a nearby stream, filling a bowser towed by the Lamborghini tractor, but this proves inadequate for his vegetables. He gives a virtual tour of his farm for an inspection for Red Tractor accreditation by Assured Food Standards. The 20 mature trees he had planted shed their leaves in dry conditions. The sheep are sheared, but each fleece is worth less than £1.
7	7	"Fluffing"	11 June 2021
Lisa stocks the farm shop, selling locally sourced produce. Initially, nothing in the shop originates on the farm, so Clarkson extracts honey from the beehives. He harvests his wasabi plants and tasks Kaleb with selling them in London restaurants; Kaleb is unsuccessful in this endeavour as well as receiving a parking ticket. The wasabi is placed in the farm shop where it does not sell and eventually rots.
8	8	"Harvesting"	11 June 2021
Clarkson has logistical problems as the barley and rape are both ready for harvest at the same time. He manages to hire a combine but then has trouble storing the barley. The wheat, however, is good quality and fetches a good price from the local mill. Because the crops brought in £90,000 less than the previous year, due to the poor weather, Clarkson's profit on the year's arable farming is a meagre £144.

=== Series 2 (2023) ===
No. overall	No. in series	Title	Original release date
9	1	"Surviving"	10 February 2023
Clarkson attempts to diversify his farm's revenue sources (having made only £144 in the previous year) in an effort to increase his profits. In particular, he decides to start a cow herd and promptly buys several of the animals. However, the timing of when they will bring in money and the necessity of building an enclosure for them causes problems for Jeremy and Charlie. Meanwhile, inspired by the success of the farm shop, Clarkson has the idea to open a restaurant in the abandoned lambing barn to sell his beef and lamb, but he must deal with the cost of converting the barn and getting approval from the local council.
10	2	"Cowering"	10 February 2023
Clarkson's herd of cows begins to settle in on the farm, but things immediately begin to go awry. The cows aren't keen on the idea of a fence and quickly escape, and when Clarkson attempts to wean the calves, they too break out and cause chaos. In addition, the new chickens brought in to help fertilise the soil also prove to be difficult to handle as he also had some roosters, who somehow were able to break out of their coop and into the hens.
11	3	"Schmoozing"	10 February 2023
Clarkson is ready to submit his application for his farm restaurant; he must use gentle navigation and respect for bureaucracy in order to keep his interests afloat. This, of course, is not easy for Jeremy, so he has to be careful.
12	4	"Badgering"	10 February 2023
Clarkson is informed by Charlie that his cows are in danger of contracting Bovine Tuberculosis from the badgers on the farm. He decides to resolve the issue by killing the latter but is informed that this is illegal in most cases. Faced with a danger to his herd, Clarkson must hope for the best. With Winter coming, Clarkson decides to build a new barn for his cows. Clarkson manages to find a dead badger, and send it off for testing. The results come back, it's positive for Tuberculosis, is this the end of the cows? Time to test them..
13	5	"Council-ing"	10 February 2023
The results of the Tuberculosis test come back, but a fresh danger presents itself to the farm called Bird Flu. Kaleb triggers the new security system and wipes out a shed. It's birthing day for the new cows, and somehow Clarkson misses a few of them. Determined to see one, he makes a purchase of an early warning system. After weeks of waiting, the day of judgement for Clarkson's restaurant at last arrives.
14	6	"Counselling"	10 February 2023
Following the council's rejection of his restaurant in the previous episode, Clarkson must pick up the pieces and get back on track if he hopes to ever make a profit on his farm. Bureaucracy takes hold in this one, with the farm-shop needing a new roof, some cows needing to be registered, and some potential crisp solutions being found to be carcinogenic with his oil. Tired of the seeming vendetta against him, Clarkson heads to the government to appeal the recent decisions. Kaleb buys a new tractor, and the typical Clarkson "vehicle spec comparison" takes place with his. Clarkson hosts a hedge-making contest.
15	7	"Scheming"	10 February 2023
Clarkson, determined to open his restaurant, decides to approach things from a different angle. Figuring that obtaining legitimate permission will be too costly and time-consuming, he and Charlie decide that secrecy and speed is their best option. After learning from Alan that an old barn on his property could be converted without prior planning permission, Jeremy decides to set up shop there. However, the plan's success is hinging on the council not objecting to anything about the site, meaning that nearly all the work must be completed in just 48 hours in order to prevent a formal complaint from being lodged. Elsewhere, a last-ditch effort to get Pepper, Clarkson's favourite heifer, pregnant may force a difficult decision.
16	8	"Climaxing"	10 February 2023
Clarkson and his team must work harder than ever on secret preparations and last-minute arrangements in order to ensure the success of his restaurant. However, the inevitable delays and various problems threaten to allow the council to shut them down for good. In the end the attempt was successful and the restaurant was opened. Afterwards, after finding out Pepper wasn't pregnant again, Clarkson adopts her as a pet to keep her from being chopped up.

=== Series 3 (2024) ===
No. overall	No. in series	Title	Original release date	UK viewers (millions)
17	1	"Unfarming"	3 May 2024	7.68
Diddly Squat is experiencing tough times as Jeremy is forced to close his restaurant by the local council and the 2022 European drought has made getting anything to grow extremely difficult. In an attempt to boost productivity and diversify, Jeremy appoints Kaleb as Farm Manager and begins a competition with Kaleb managing the arable and Clarkson running the non-arable areas of the farm. Clarkson sets off to harvest blackberries and purchase pigs for his side, but soon runs into trouble when the blackberry harvesting machine destroys a wall. Meanwhile, Gerald is diagnosed with cancer.
18	2	"Porking"	3 May 2024	7.30
Neighbouring farmers Andy Cato — of the band Groove Armada — and George Lamb introduce Jeremy to the concepts of regenerative agriculture and dual-planting, convincing him to try the methods on his half of the farm. Elsewhere, Clarkson's litter of Oxford Sandy and Black pigs arrives, although efforts to get them to breed are slow to bear fruit. Faced with increasingly challenging standards to keep the farm shop open, Charlie and Jeremy debate moving the farm shop outside of the local council's jurisdiction before deciding to launch an appeal to the Planning Inspectorate.
19	3	"Jobbing"	3 May 2024	7.19
Jeremy returns from holiday to find the farm in desperate need of him. One of the sows has unexpectedly had piglets, who all need to be moved to the woods. The farm's dam is also in dire need of repair as the rainy season approaches, but efforts to fix it falter when Kaleb and Jeremy bicker about the best approach. Elsewhere, Charlie attempts to persuade Lisa to comply with the council's ruling on the farm shop's products.
20	4	"Harrowing"	3 May 2024	6.72
More of Clarkson's pigs have piglets; however, over a quarter of them die soon afterwards due to overlaying, while one of the sows has to be euthanised, deeply affecting Jeremy and Lisa.
21	5	"Healing"	10 May 2024	N/A
Jeremy attempts to produce nettle soup for the farm shop; however, he abandons it as it isn't profitable. Furthermore, he converts an underground bunker into a mushroom growing facility. A sap test shows Cato's regenerative agriculture yielding results, while the dam repair is still not moving along. To make more land arable, Jeremy buys goats to have them eat down his brambles. Jeremy attempts to breed more pigs and Gerald returns to work on the farm having recovered from his cancer.
22	6	"Mushrooming"	10 May 2024	N/A
Jeremy has won the appeal against the local council, with virtually all of their restrictions being overturned. Jeremy harvests his mushrooms, producing more than he can sell. Meanwhile, Kaleb and Charlie meet UK Prime Minister Rishi Sunak to discuss getting young people into farming. The pigs attempt to get pregnant again, while Jeremy finally gets onto the dam. Another intra-battle update sees Kaleb crack the 100k loss barrier, can he turn it around?
23	7	"Parking"	10 May 2024	N/A
Freed from the local council's restrictions, Jeremy sets to build a bigger parking area, but can't prevent people parking on it before construction is finalised. To manage the overpopulation of deer on his property, Jeremy decides to go hunting. Furthermore, Jeremy and Kaleb have to recall a batch of their cider due to a manufacturing issue where it blows up. Meanwhile, the pig-rings are finally ready before the new pigs can be born. While disinfectant of the old mushroom area went mostly well, the exhaust fan wasn't cleaned, which resulted in most of his new batch of mushrooms being destroyed by mould. A chance encounter with a customer enables the farm to deal with their flooding issues in low-lying areas. Jeremy rents out his goats to another farmer, and is shocked when Charlie is representing the renter. Charlie vs Charlie? Who wins
24	8	"Calculating"	10 May 2024	N/A
It's go time for harvest, and combining issues mean that Jeremy ends up destroying a fence. Due to the weather, the Durum Wheat BARELY makes it pasta-eligible, the barley can't be used for beer. Poor crop performance means Jeremy offers to buy Kaleb a beer, will this one explode? Back to the "easy" dam fix, and a third attempt means it's still not fixed. Pepper, who was going to be put down last year being adopted as a pet, has had a child, to the delight of both Jeremy and Lisa. Back to the competition, and Jeremy has turned £27,000 profit on his half (or about 50%), while Kaleb has made a profit of £45,000 (or about 25%). No time for celebration, they have to reinvest all their money to buy seeds and fertiliser for the next cycle, meaning they have essentially not made any money for two years straight.

=== Series 4 (2025) ===
No. overall	No. in series	Title	Original release date	UK viewers (millions)
25	1	"Solo-ing"	23 May 2025	6.51
After previous financial failures, Clarkson is resolved to turn a profit. With Kaleb Cooper away on tour, and Clarkson struggling, farmer Harriet Cowen is recruited from Derbyshire to run the farm. Clarkson searches for a pub outside of West Oxfordshire as a replacement for the on-site farm shop. Increasing problems with the Lamborghini tractor hold up planting.
26	2	"Pubbing"	23 May 2025	7.53
Clarkson's plan to re-open the Coach and Horses pub in Bourton-on-the-Water before the August Bank Holiday is set back by planning permission and renovation costs. Jeremy invites tractor manufacturers Case IH, Claas, Fendt, JCB Fastrac, John Deere, Massey Ferguson, McCormick Tractors, New Holland Agriculture and Valtra for a nine-way test at the farm.
27	3	"Crawling"	23 May 2025	7.35
Wary of more planning paperwork delaying his plans, the offer on the pub is withdrawn. Flooding and rain make ploughing impossible, so Clarkson plants willow trees for cricket bat production. Kaleb Cooper returns in time for new piglets being born. Clarkson and Lisa view even more pubs; and with a short list of the three fastest tractors in hand, Clarkson arranges delivery.
28	4	"Cottaging"	23 May 2025	6.97
Clarkson's new tractor breaks down after ploughing. The pigs destroy their woodland enclosure. Clarkson takes Lisa and the team to visit The Windmill pub, on the A40 road next to Asthall barrow, and its adjacent picnic site, which turns out to be a well-known dogging and cottaging location.
29	5	"Endgaming"	30 May 2025	6.88
The goats get Nofence GPS collars. The new driverless tractor gets repaired. West Oxfordshire District Council have some news regarding The Windmill pub's picnic site, so Clarkson proposes to put in a purchase offer after seeking advice from pub owners Piers Morgan from The Hansom Cab, James Blunt from the Fox and Pheasant, Guy Ritchie of The Lore of the Land, and James May from The Royal Oak, Swallowcliffe. New bull "Endgame" arrives to join the cows.
30	6	"Splurging"	30 May 2025	7.15
Clarkson meets Harriet at Rugby Farmers Mart to learn auction chant and buy some cattle. Renovation work starts at the pub, starting with the septic tank. Surplus Brewer's spent grain is collected from the Hawkstone Brewery to fatten up the cows. More piglets arrive and the GPS-trained goats start clearing the blackberry bushes. Ergot fungus is found in the wheat field. Clarkson takes an old Massey Ferguson tractor to classic car restoration provider Richard Hammond for repainting and calls Andy Wilman to ask what happened to The Grand Tour tent.
31	7	"Hurrying"	6 June 2025	6.86
Clarkson learns via Kaleb's Instagram account that the barley harvest has begun and returns to the farm. Electricians, joiners, and decorators are still busy, holding up kitchen preparation. During tree and stump work around the pub, Clarkson tries the Dipperfox stump grinder, titling it his new favourite machine in the world. Kaleb cracks the "Farmer's Clubhouse" neon sign. Local farming cooperative members arrive with produce and some British-grown black pepper is sourced from Cornwall, costing £100 per kilogram. Richard Hammond gets a call from Clarkson asking if the restored tractor is ready.
32	8	"Landlording"	6 June 2025	6.88
On opening day, Kaleb creates The Farmer's Dog signs, before playing Aunt Sally with Gerald in the garden. Electrical power and gas keep going off, and despite endless rain the potable drinking water supply runs out too. Pub consultants Sue and Rachel give Clarkson a dressing down. Chef Nick Rowberry tries to source more British meat for the carvery without wholesaling. There's trouble at mill when the durum wheat harvest fails its Hagberg-Perten Falling Number test. Richard Ham gets a new role as pig fluffer. All of the Clarkson's Farm team meet for an annual recap—at another pub.

=== Series 5 (2026) ===
No. overall	No. in series	Title	Original release date	UK viewers (millions)
33	1	"Operating"	3 June 2026	7.08
After running on zero sleep at the end of season 4, Clarkson ends up with a medical emergency, ultimately getting a stent put in. A prescribed recovery of "no manual labour" has Kaleb openly celebrating. More animals are on their way, with the purchase of so-called 'Easy-care' sheep, and 5 cows becoming expectant, although one of the new sheep is mauled by a wild dog. Oscar Piastri turns up and gets a driving lesson, including reversing, before attempting himself. Despite it being an active source of stress, Clarkson attempts to fix the numerous issues that have plagued the pub - food supply, electrical, theft, water pressure, carparking, tent leakage and staffing problems. Building a bonfire causes some minor dramas, as it immediately gets burnt down by disillusioned staff and needs a rebuild. Charlie returns from holiday, bringing news about tax reforms affecting most farmers. The celebrations otherwise go off without a hitch, delighting the staff and guests.
34	2	"Storming"	3 June 2026	6.80
Jeremy and the farm staff attend a protest march following the news of tax-reforms from the previous episode, with him ultimately being one of the guest speakers. The Corrs turn up to perform live-music at the pub. Rams are introduced to the sheep, Lisa takes up snail farming intending to use it to make beauty-creams, and rearing geese also arrive. Storm Darragh causes widespread destruction to both the pub and the farm, and the sheep get vaccinated for bluetongue. Christmas plans take over, with Jeremy getting a Christmas Tree, Lisa's geese being served for a few days (or the reality of a night), and Jeremy looking to implement a nativity scene using some of his goats, with predictable mayhem.
35	3	"Tripping"	3 June 2026	6.42
Kaleb and Jeremy head to an agricultural machinery show, completely bewildering Jeremy, who is seduced by the futuristic-looking machinery. Influenced by this, they decide to head to the Netherlands to explore their farming methods. Kaleb goes overseas for the first time via the Channel Tunnel, which causes him some minor distress, but largely enjoys the experience. They meet a Dutch potato "farmer" to learn about modernisation - who ultimately got his success via precision farming. They also meet a dairy farmer, who rears 30 cows (and processes their milk into cheese) on a 1-acre floating farm in the middle of Rotterdam, with their ultimate motive being reducing food loss and sustainability.
36	4	"Updating"	3 June 2026	6.02
The pub closes for renovations, trying to get on top of the constant power problems. It has also lost £8.5k over the first few months, prompting a discussion about increasing prices. A new episode means some new animals, with fowl arriving, and a lamb from one of the sheep, baffling the staff. A purchase from Episode 3 finally arrives, a driverless tractor originating from Holland. A group of youths take over the pub for a few hours, with them ultimately wanting to race horses down the A40. The precision farming methods are used for both cultivating and muck-spreading, using imported rhino poop from a local tourist park. The driverless tractor has technical issues for its first job, delighting Kaleb. A trip to the butcher reveals that the pigs are only relevant for sausages, leading to heartbreak to Jeremy as they all depart, concluding the pig-experiment.
37	5	"Decapitating"	10 June 2026	5.93
The driverless tractor issues are resolved, which allows for 24x7 working. This leads to a bunch of farm-admin work, including picking up an abandoned coolbox and the trees felled by Storm Darragh. The fowl care comes to an end, with a fox visiting for some free meals. Kaleb continues his crusade against the AgBot, which isn't road-legal and causes a dilemma when being transported between fields. More animals, with the birth of cows and snails. Jeremy has to provide manual assistance for the 3rd cow, which delights both him and Kaleb. Another purchase from episode 3 arrives, a solar-powered onion planter. Not all pigs have departed, Richard Ham gets a new friend, James "May" Boar.
38	6	"Frazzling"	10 June 2026	5.95
The sheep start giving birth, and thousands of new baby snails have also been born. Jeremy's micro-managing of Kaleb causes annoyance, with the new robots replacing old machinery and allowing for real-time monitoring. Jeremy decides to sell the original tractor, ultimately fetching £70k at auction. The robot's first seeding of Onions and Beetroots are showing promising signs. Bored... Jeremy discovers that the government introduced a scheme to pay £750 to "slow down the pace of water" for each dam, which he and Kaleb immediately get onto, but run into a roadblock as they needed to get approval first (maybe that Season 3 dam might finally be finished). Jeremy wants to host a "dare night" at the pub, containing the likes of sheep brains, tripe, squirrel, snail caviar, and a palate-cleanser hot sauce measuring 15 million on the scoville scale. Despite some minor concerns [and some scolded tongues], dare-night goes well. More climate issues see the crops start withering due to dehydration, at least it's not the floods of last year.
39	7	"Sickening"	17 June 2026	5.69
A neighbouring sheep farmer helps with sheep moving, using a sheepdog and taking a matter of minutes. Kaleb makes a reversing faux-pas and backs into a producer's car, providing ammunition to Jeremy. Jeremy then meets with a local bird-watcher at 4am, understanding that 13/20 farmyard birds are massively endangered, but manages to see a Corn Bunting, delighting them both. This causes an issue as farm-practices essentially kill the baby chicks (while mowing crops and producing cow food) - the solution of using a "heat seeking drone" potentially enables this dilemma to be resolved. More animals, with a herd of geese and donkeys arriving - Charlie compares it to a petting zoo. A pre-harvest crop-walk indicates grim results, with Mustard / Onions / Wheat / Beetroot / Barley all affected. Jeremy drops the news of his cancer treatment, which ultimately clashes with the harvest schedule, and sobers the staff. The bad news keeps dropping, with a cow potentially testing positive for TB, and putting the herd under quarantine.
40	8	"Reaping"	17 June 2026	5.36
The affected cow is immediately isolated, which devastates the staff. Simon has retired, so Kaleb has bought a combine for himself, allowing him to live a childhood dream. Despite wanting it for 5 months, the rain finally arrives in great quantities, except they now want it to be dry because it's harvest time. Desperate to get harvest completed, Jeremy breaks his tractor and seals himself in, causing more delays. With Jeremy departing for his treatment, Lisa gets trained to replace him, arguably doing better than Jeremy does, delighting both herself and Kaleb - who then ONLY picks Lisa when both are available. The results of precision farming are in, with the highest yield coming from the "plant only in the good areas". Jeremy runs into a stroke of luck when Kaleb's partner goes into labour, but he chooses to finalise the harvest first. Hannah the bird watcher returns with a survey, indicating that there are 45 different bird species, with Jeremy's farm containing 19 different Corn Bunting, causing jubilation. A pre-harvest prediction of £38k profit is immediately sobered with the reality of a £5k loss, influenced by a poor yield due to the lack of rain. Jeremy critiques the accuracy of the TB test, with the quarantined cow being deemed inconclusive and deemed a carrier - it means an immediate culling, despite being pregnant with 2 calves. A different calf with pneumonia is euthanised with a sedative. A post-mortem of "inconclusive cow" found that it did NOT have TB, infuriating Jeremy as the farm is still under lockdown due to the original test. The post-year "celebration" sees a struggle to find things to celebrate - but there are the 10 new puppies, the precision farming and the success of the robots. In a weird full-circle moment, the season starts and ends with Jeremy in a hospital bed, teasing season 6.

== Reception ==
On Farming Today, Clarkson said that he listens to the BBC programme's podcast. The opinions of the active farmers interviewed were favourable.

I thought it was remarkably good and entertaining. … Many farmers will think that this is putting them and their experience over in a positive way … There were some proper laugh-out-loud moments … I am so inspired by the way that Jeremy Clarkson has talked about the industry and the people who have helped him …

Other farmers were also reported to have shown an "overwhelmingly favourable" reaction to Clarkson's Farm. The sheep farmer James Rebanks said that the farming community "all loved that programme", and that Clarkson had done more for farming in one series than 30 years of the BBC's long-running farming programme Countryfile. Viewers have found the programme educational and entertaining, and that "they now feel much better informed about farming". The National Farmers' Union awarded Clarkson 2021 Farming Champion of the Year as "a vocal champion for the British farming industry", and producing that year a show that showcased the realities of farming and one that "has really resonated with the public". Clarkson and his farm assistant Kaleb Cooper won the Flying the Flag for British Agriculture award at the British Farming Awards.

Joel Golby, reviewing for The Guardian, found Clarkson's verbal signalling of his jokes by lowering his voice tiring, but the format, in which his blunders are corrected by no-nonsense country folk, works well, "It's simply, just … really good TV". Lucy Mangan wrote a different review for The Guardian a week later, but only gave it one star out of five. She was tired by Clarkson's role as an ignorant buffoon and called the show "wearisome, meretricious rubbish … The series amounts to less and less as time goes on."

Anita Singh reviewed the show for The Daily Telegraph. She liked the apparent authenticity of Clarkson's involvement in the farming, "…when you see Clarkson despairing at his crop failures, or yelping with delight when he helps to deliver a lamb, it feels genuine." She liked the supporting players, such as Kaleb and Charlie, and that "Clarkson’s gone soft, and it makes for surprisingly good viewing."

Suzi Feay gave the show five stars in the Financial Times. She especially liked "…some of rural England’s more surprising characters … Clarkson’s Farm features some unique types that are rarely spotted on screen."

Hugo Rifkind, reviewing for The Times, likes Clarkson's "honesty of self" and appreciated both the good fun and the increasingly earnest engagement, "…you get to watch a familiar face grow smitten with his new life, coming to understand the responsibility of feeding Britain … a quite lovely documentary series about life on a farm…"

Marty Meany reviewed Clarkson's Farm for Goosed.ie, describing Jeremy as a "grown man playing Farming Simulator in real life", but whether you "love him or hate him, Clarkson's Farm sees Jeremy return to his very best" after years of creating "blatantly scripted" television. Meany gave the show four and a half stars in his review.

Following the release of the show on Amazon, the show received widespread acclaim from viewers and was a popular success online, being rated five stars on Google. The show was also well-received on the Chinese website Douban from nearly 80,000 Chinese people, who awarded it a rating 9.6 out of 10 for the first series.

In 2025 Clarkson's Farm won the Factual Entertainment category at the National Television Awards. In 2026 it won the Reality Docuseries category at the same awards.

== Impact ==
The popularity of Clarkson's Farm led to large number of visitors to the farm shop opened by Clarkson, which resulted in a 3-mile-long (5 km) traffic jam and necessitated the attendance of the police to handle the disruption in traffic. As a result, Clarkson faced a strong backlash from the people of Chadlington. Later that day he took to Twitter, writing: "People of Chadlington. I’m truly sorry about the traffic around our farm shop last weekend. We are doing everything we can to improve the situation".

The West Oxfordshire District Council blocked attempts by Clarkson to build a car park, a restaurant and the building of a road to another restaurant he opened. The restaurant in a converted barn was forced to close and the planting of trees to screen a car park was denied. The dispute between Clarkson and West Oxfordshire District Council was said to have led to a change in planning regulation, which is dubbed "Clarkson's clause" and it allows farmers to convert disused agricultural buildings for commercial and residential use without planning permission.

To address the concerns about capacity, Clarkson bought a nearby pub/restaurant on the A40 trunk road and opened this as The Farmer's Dog in 2024.

The popularity of the show has increased public awareness of the challenges faced by farmers, and this is said to have led to an increase in the willingness of the public to buy homegrown farm produce and support local producers in the UK.

== Ratings ==
According to Barb, the first episode of the second series of Clarkson's Farm broke viewing record on Amazon in the UK and became the most watched original series on Amazon. It was watched by 4.3 million viewers on TV in seven days, with more UK viewers watching the episode than The Lord of the Rings: The Rings of Power, which had 3.2 million viewers for its first episode in 2022. The first episode was ranked No. 16 across all channels. 3.8 million watched the second episode (ranked No. 27 the same week), and 3.3 million watched the third (ranked No. 40). A total of 7.6 million individuals had watched the show across its eight episodes over 28 days, which made it the most-watched show on Amazon Prime in the UK.

The ratings for the first series were not available since Barb only started measuring viewership for on-demand video platforms such as Amazon in November 2021. In China, the first episode of the first series received over 5 million views on the Chinese streaming service Bilibili.

The viewing figures of the third series improved on those of the second series the UK when the first four episodes were released on 3 May 2024. Overnight viewing figures showed 3.7 million watched the first episode, 3.1 million the second, 2.5 million the third and 2.1 million the fourth. Viewing figures over 7 days showed that the first episode was streamed by 5.1 million television viewers (5.2 million including mobile devices), which made it the most-streamed show on Amazon Prime in the UK, and the second most-streamed show of 2024 on any streaming service in the UK after Fool Me Once on Netflix. The second episode was watched by 4.7 million viewers, the third 4.3 million and the fourth 3.9 million, making the first four episodes the 4th, 6th, 11th and 14th most-watched TV shows of the week in the UK. Over 28 days, the first episode was watched by 7.68 million viewers, making it the No.1 show released that week. The last four episodes were released the following week, and they were watched by 4.1 million (episode 5), 3.7 million (episode 6), and 3.5 (episode 8). The first four episodes released previous week also gained further views of 2.7 million (episodes 3 and 4), 2.4 million (episode 2) and 2.3 (episode 1).

Seven days viewing figures for the first six episodes of the fourth series showed a slight increase compared to the third. The first four episodes released in the first week were watched by 5 million for episode 2, 4.6 million for episode 3, 4.4 million for episode 1, and 3.9 million for episode 4, and the weekly ranking improved with the episodes ranking 2nd, 4th, 6th and 13th respectively. 28 days viewing figures showed all four episode in the top 5, with episode 2 receiving 7.53 million viewers and episode 3 7.35 million. Two episodes were released the second week, with 4.4 million having watched episode 6 and 4.3 million episode 5, while the episodes released in the first week received further views of 2.6 million (episode 4), 2.5 (episode 3) and 2.3 million (episode 2). These episodes were ranked 3rd, 4th, 34th, 37th, and 45th for the week. 28 days viewing figures give episode 5 and 6 as the 2nd and 3rd most-watched episode, with 6.88 and 7.15 million viewers respectively. The final two episodes released in the third week were watched by 4.9 (episode 7) and 4.6 (episode 8) and were the 2nd and 3rd most-watched show for the week. They were the 3rd and 2nd most-watched episode with 6.86 and 6.88 million respectively on the 28 days chart. Clarkson's Farm was the most-watched Amazon Prime show of the year in the UK.

== Future ==
In November 2024, Clarkson's Farm was renewed for a fifth series. In May 2025, after transmission of the fourth series, Jeremy stated that the show would be taking a break after completion of the fifth series, acknowledging the crew's fatigue from five consecutive years of filming. However, he also affirmed that he remains open to further series if a compelling story emerges. In January 2026, the show was renewed for a sixth series, with Clarkson hinting at having ideas for a possible seventh. The sixth series was confirmed to be in production by June 2026.
