= Lite-Trac =

UK agricultural machinery manufacturer

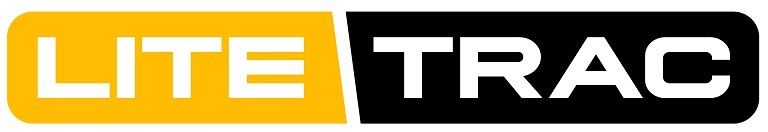
- Type: Private
- Industry: Agricultural machinery, Agriculture
- Headquarters: Peterborough, UK
- Area served: Europe
- Key people: Paul McAvoy, Andrew McAvoy, Jason Robinson
- Products: Agricultural machinery
- Services: NSTS sprayer testing, bespoke machinery, spare parts, servicing
- Website: www.lite-trac.com

Lite-Trac is a trading name of Holme Farm Supplies Ltd, a manufacturer of agricultural machinery registered in England and based in Peterborough. The Lite-Trac name comes from "lite tractor", due to the patented chassis design enabling the inherently very heavy machines manufactured by the company to have a light footprint for minimum soil compaction.

Holme Farm Supplies Ltd agricultural products, sold under the Lite-Trac name, include tool carriers, self-propelled lime and fertiliser spreaders, sprayers, granular applicators and tank masters. Lite-Trac is currently the manufacturer of Europe's largest four-wheeled self-propelled crop sprayers. The company's products are identifiable by the combination of unpainted stainless steel tanks and booms with bright yellow cabs and detailing.

== History ==
Lite-Trac had existed as a name since before 2006, with first prototypes built in 2004. Following the success of initial testing, Lite-Trac was incorporated in 2008 to develop and manufacture the SS2400 Tool Carrier with its patented chassis layout. Since then Lite-Trac has gone on to develop its own crop sprayers which exploit the potential of the SS2400 chassis and has branched out into spreading and granular application.

== Products ==
Lite-Trac manufactures a range of agricultural machinery.

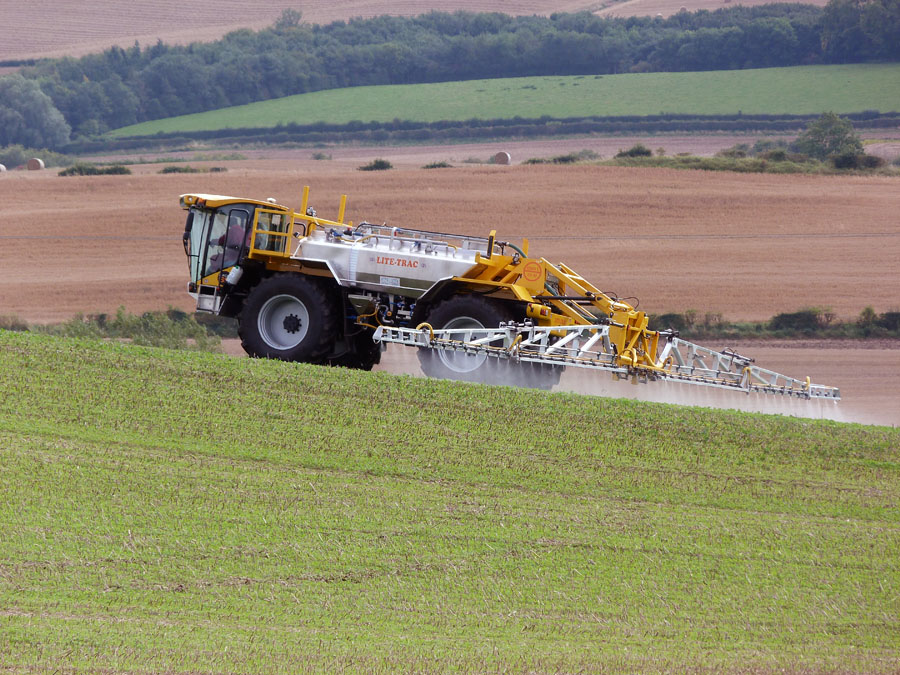
A smaller Lite-Trac crop sprayer mounted onto the SS2400 Tool Carrier.

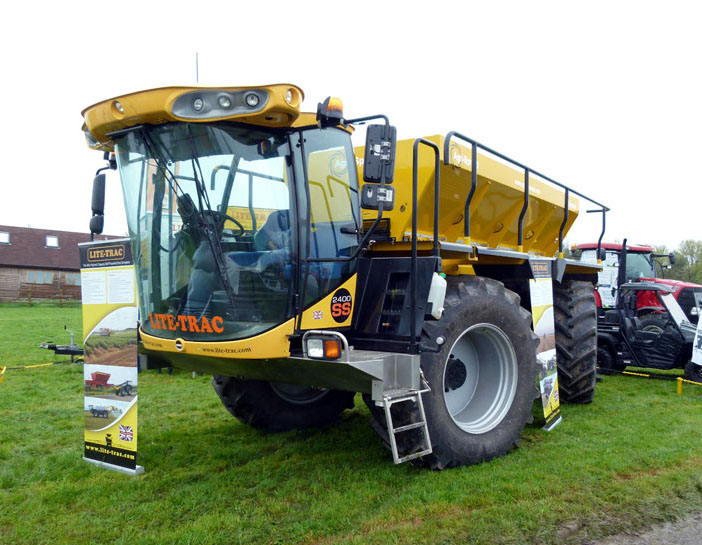
A Lite-Trac Agri-Spread lime and fertilizer spreader at Grassland & Muck 2011

=== SS2400 Tool Carrier ===
The Lite-Trac SS2400 is a tool carrier with a 14 tonne payload capacity. The patented chassis layout with its mid-mounted driveline gives equal weight distribution on all four wheels. The fully mechanical driveline is particularly suited to heavy work in hilly conditions and includes a 6 speed automatic power shift gearbox with locking torque converter which is capable of 50 km/h. It also features a 260 horse power (194 kW) engine, air suspension, anti-roll bars and a forward mounted cab.

=== Sprayers ===
When it comes to self-propelled sprayers, there is big and bigger. Then we come to the Lite Trac.

— Arable Focus, Farmers Guardian

A Lite-Trac crop sprayer, or liquid fertiliser applicator, mounts onto the SS2400 Tool Carrier centrally between both axles to maintain equal weight distribution on all four wheels and a low centre of gravity whether empty or full. The stainless steel tanks are manufactured in capacities of up to 8,000 litres, whilst Pommier aluminium booms of up to 48 meters can be fitted, making these Europe's largest four-wheeled self-propelled sprayers.

Lite-Trac also manufacture bespoke sprayers.

=== Spreaders ===
Agri-Spread high capacity demountable spreader mounts onto the SS2400 Tool Carrier and is specifically designed to take full advantage of its 50/50 weight distribution. The spreader is capable of spreading a wide range of materials including fertiliser, fibre foss, lime and poultry waste.

The standard hopper can hold up to 12t lime, or 5.6t fertiliser, and extension sides are available for lighter materials. Spreading widths of 24m and above are achievable at rates of 20 kg/Ha to 4t/Ha, subject to the product.

=== Granular applicators ===
Lite-Trac pneumatic applicators for precision application of slug pellets and Avadex are manufactured in widths of up to 36 metres.

== Events ==
Lite-Trac showcases its machinery at the following shows and events:

- Grassland & Muck
- LAMMA
- Cereals Event
- Tillage Live
- Grassland UK

== Articles ==
- Is this the new ultimate multi function tractor - Agriland June 2018
- cereals 2018 - lite-trac becomes more tractor Profi
- Lamma '10: Covering the miles as well as the crops is crucial for contractor Farmers Guardian. 5 January 2010.
- Harvest Highlights Photos 2010 Farmers Weekly ispace. 2010.
- View from the H-edge Farmers Weekly ispace. 2010.
- Extending sprayer capabilities Farmers Weekly. 2 June 2011.
