= Guild of Agricultural Journalists =

The British Guild of Agricultural Journalists is a membership organisation representing editors and journalists, broadcasters, photographers, public relations and marketing specialists working in agriculture, commercial horticulture and other rural industries in the United Kingdom.

== History ==
The idea of an agricultural reporters' organisation was first mooted by Sir Reginald Dorman-Smith, Minister of Agriculture from 1939-40. He approached Richard Haddon, managing editor of the Farmer and Stockbreeder magazine and senior voluntary press adviser to the Ministry of Agriculture, who in turn sought the backing of NFU Secretary Sir Cleveland Fyfe. Between 1941 and 1943, Haddon gathered a nucleus of senior journalists and was elected the Guild's first chairman in 1944.

Founder members included:

- Kenneth Pipe (first Honorary Treasurer; Chairman 1948-9; President 1967-8)
- Percy Izzard
- Anthony Hurd (agricultural correspondent of The Times, father of Douglas Hurd)
- Sidney Maycock (editor of The Smallholder, then selling some 250,000 copies weekly)
- Laurence Easterbrook (agricultural correspondent of the News Chronicle)
- William Adair (editor of Scotland's Farming News)
- Jock Robertson Coupar (agricultural correspondent for the Press Association)
- Wilfrid Hill (public relations officer for the Milk Marketing Board, and seconded to the Minister during the war emergency)

In his history of the Guild, Peter Bell reports that the early constitution of the Guild was lifted en bloc from another organisation and set out only the bread-and-butter running of the Guild. It was not until much later - 1959 - that the aims and objects familiar to today's members became part of the constitution. Despite Dorman-Smith's backing, Haddon did not wish the Guild to become a convenience for the Minister and the early members fashioned it in the form of a 'brotherhood'; the social side was important from the start.

Initially, membership was open to agricultural journalists who gained three-quarters of their income from their writing. Annual subscription amounted to one guinea; half that for probationers. The earliest recorded meetings took place at the Milk Board's offices, presumably because of Wilfrid Hill's connections, but the venue soon switched to the Farmers Club in Whitehall Court, which has become the de facto London base of the Guild. By July 1948, membership had reached more than 100.

Although the Guild started life as the GAJ of Great Britain and Northern Ireland, the last three words were dropped after the Irish Republic formed a Guild to which the Northern Ireland members linked in 1962-3. In 2012, the name was further simplified to the British Guild of Agricultural Journalists.

== Aims and Objectives ==
1. To promote the highest professional standard among journalists, communicators, photographers and others who specialise in communications in agriculture, horticulture, rural affairs and related subjects
2. To represent members' interests and maintain relations with appropriate representative bodies
3. To provide a forum, through business meetings and social activities for members to meet eminent people in these industries
4. To maintain contact with similar associations overseas
5. To promote schemes for the continuing professional development of members of the Guild and for the provision and training of suitable entrants into agricultural and related journalism
6. To contribute towards a better understanding of agriculture's social, economic and environmental importance

== Membership ==
Membership is open to anyone who earns their livelihood wholly or mainly through journalism or communication in the agricultural, horticultural and related industries. A 'Friend' category exists for those who do not meet the full membership criteria, but who nevertheless support the aims and objectives of the Guild, and who can make a contribution to its well-being and/or members.

== Events ==
The Guild hosts a number of events each year. Chief amongst these is the annual Harvest Service held in St Brides' Church on Fleet Street, followed by luncheon. Others include receptions at the Cereals Event, LAMMA and the Royal Highland Show. The Guild hosted a reception at the Royal Welsh Show for the first time in 2012.

== Awards ==
Several awards are run by the Guild, often supported by sponsors. While some are restricted only to members, others are open to all.

== Affiliations ==
The Guild is a member of:

1. The International Federation of Agricultural Journalists (IFAJ)
2. The European Network of Agricultural Journalists (ENAJ)
