= 29th National Television Awards =

British awards ceremony in 2024

- Date: 11 September 2024
- Location: The O2 Arena, London
- Country: United Kingdom
- Presented by: Various
- Hosted by: Joel Dommett
- Most awards: Mr Bates vs The Post Office (3)
- Most nominations: Coronation Street; EastEnders (both 3)
- Website: www.nationaltvawards.com

Television/radio coverage
- Network: ITV1
- Runtime: 155 minutes

The 29th National Television Awards were held on 11 September 2024 at the O2 Arena and were hosted by Joel Dommett for the fourth year running. The longlist nominations were released on 21 May 2024 and the shortlist was announced on 20 August 2024.

== Performances ==
- Olly Murs - "Dance with Me Tonight", "Heart Skips a Beat" and "Troublemaker"

== Awards ==
Category and presenter(s)	Winner	Shortlisted
"Factual"; Presented by Graham Norton	Sort Your Life Out (BBC One)	Clarkson's Farm (Amazon Prime Video); Gogglebox (Channel 4); The Martin Lewis Money Show Live (ITV1); The Yorkshire Vet (Channel 5)
"Drama Performance"; Presented by Keely Hodgkinson	Toby Jones (as Alan Bates, Mr Bates vs The Post Office – ITV1)	Brenda Blethyn (as DCI Vera Stanhope, Vera – ITV1); Jessica Gunning (as Martha, Baby Reindeer – Netflix); Michelle Keegan (as Maya Stern, Fool Me Once – Netflix); Vicky McClure (as EXPO Lana Washington, Trigger Point – ITV1)
"The Bruce Forsyth Entertainment Award"; Presented by Holly Willoughby	I'm a Celebrity...Get Me Out of Here! (ITV1)	Ant & Dec's Saturday Night Takeaway (ITV1); The Graham Norton Show (BBC One); The Masked Singer (ITV1); Michael McIntyre's Big Show (BBC One)
"Reality Competition"; Presented by Mary Bonnet and Chelsea Lazkani	The Traitors (BBC One)	The Apprentice (BBC One); Celebrity Big Brother (ITV1); Love Island (ITV2); Race Across the World (BBC One)
"Serial Drama Performance"; Presented by Bobby Brazier	Peter Ash (as Paul Foreman, Coronation Street – ITV1)	Angela Wynter (as Yolande Trueman, EastEnders – BBC One); David Neilson (as Roy Cropper, Coronation Street – ITV1); Diane Parish (as Denise Fox, EastEnders – BBC One); Eden Taylor-Draper (as Belle King, Emmerdale – ITV1)
"Impact"; Presented by Clive Myrie	Mr Bates vs The Post Office	
"TV Presenter"; Presented by Kaleb Cooper	Ant & Dec (I'm a Celebrity...Get Me Out of Here! – ITV1)	Alison Hammond (This Morning – ITV1); Bradley Walsh (The Chase – ITV1); Claudia Winkleman (Strictly Come Dancing and The Traitors – BBC One); Stacey Solomon (Sort Your Life Out – BBC One)
"Authored Documentary"; Presented by Lindsey Burrow	Kate Garraway: Derek's Story (ITV1)	Beckham (Netflix); Rhod Gilbert: A Pain in the Neck for SU2C (Channel 4); Robbie Williams (Netflix); Rose Ayling-Ellis: Signs for Change (BBC One)
"Quiz Game Show"; Presented by Ben Shephard & Cat Deeley	The 1% Club (ITV1)	Ant & Dec's Limitless Win (ITV1); Beat the Chasers (ITV1); Michael McIntyre's The Wheel (BBC One); Richard Osman's House of Games (BBC Two)
"Returning Drama"; Presented by Richard Armitage	Bridgerton (Netflix)	Call the Midwife (BBC One); The Crown (Netflix); Trigger Point (ITV1); Vera (ITV1)
"Comedy"; Presented by Daniel Roche, Ramona Marquez & Tyger Drew-Honey	Mrs. Brown's Boys (BBC One/RTÉ One)	Brassic (Sky Max); The Gentlemen (Netflix); Ghosts (BBC One); Not Going Out (BBC One)
"Special Recognition"; Presented by Hannah Waddingham	Davina McCall	
"Expert"; Presented by Mary Berry	David Attenborough (Mammals – BBC One)	Anton Du Beke (Strictly Come Dancing – BBC One); Kaleb Cooper (Clarkson's Farm – Amazon Prime Video); Martin Lewis (The Martin Lewis Money Show – ITV1); Torvill and Dean (Dancing on Ice – ITV1)
"New Drama"; Presented by Danny Dyer & Katherine Parkinson	Mr Bates vs The Post Office (ITV)	Baby Reindeer (Netflix); Fool Me Once (Netflix); One Day (Netflix); Red Eye (ITV)
"Daytime"; Presented by AJ Odudu and Vernon Kay	The Chase (ITV1)	Deal or No Deal (ITV1); Loose Women (ITV1); This Morning (ITV1); The Repair Shop (BBC One)
"Talent Show"; Presented by Sam Thompson and Pete Wicks	Strictly Come Dancing (BBC One)	Britain's Got Talent (ITV1); The Great British Bake Off (Channel 4); MasterChef (BBC One); The Voice UK (ITV1)
"Serial Drama"; Presented by Kadeena Cox and Sarah Storey	Emmerdale (ITV1)	Casualty (BBC One); Coronation Street (ITV1); EastEnders (BBC One); Hollyoaks (Channel 4)

== Multiple wins ==
Programmes with multiple wins
Wins	Programme
3	Mr Bates vs The Post Office
2	I'm a Celebrity...Get Me Out of Here!

Networks with multiple wins
Wins	Network
10	ITV1
5	BBC One

== Multiple nominations ==
Programmes with multiple nominations
Nominations	Programme
3	Coronation Street
3	EastEnders
3	Strictly Come Dancing
2	Ant & Dec's Saturday Night Takeaway
2	Baby Reindeer
2	Britain's Got Talent
2	Clarkson's Farm
2	Emmerdale
2	Fool Me Once
2	I'm a Celebrity...Get Me Out of Here!
2	Limitless Win
2	The Martin Lewis Money Show
2	Mr Bates vs The Post Office
2	Sort Your Life Out
2	The Chase
2	The Traitors
2	This Morning
2	Trigger Point
2	Vera

Networks with multiple nominations
Nominations	Network
33	ITV1
22	BBC One
10	Netflix
4	Channel 4
3	BBC Two
2	Amazon Prime Video

== See also ==
- 2024 in British television
