= The Farmer's Dog =

Pub-restaurant and shop

- The parking lot and entrance to the Farmer's Dog, photographeed in 2025

- Location within Oxfordshire

General information
- Coordinates: 51°47′23″N 1°35′2″W
- Opened: 2024
- Owner: Jeremy Clarkson

Website
- https://thefarmersdogpub.com/

The Farmer's Dog is a pub and restaurant next to the Asthall barrow roundabout on the A40 road in West Oxfordshire near Burford, owned by television presenter Jeremy Clarkson and featured in the Amazon series Clarkson's Farm.

The pub exclusively uses produce made in Britain, completely banning any foreign ingredients. Also on the pub grounds sits The Grand Tour tent, where ancillary services are provided, including an outdoor kitchen, a butchers shop, and a Diddly Squat farm shop merchandising outlet.

== History ==
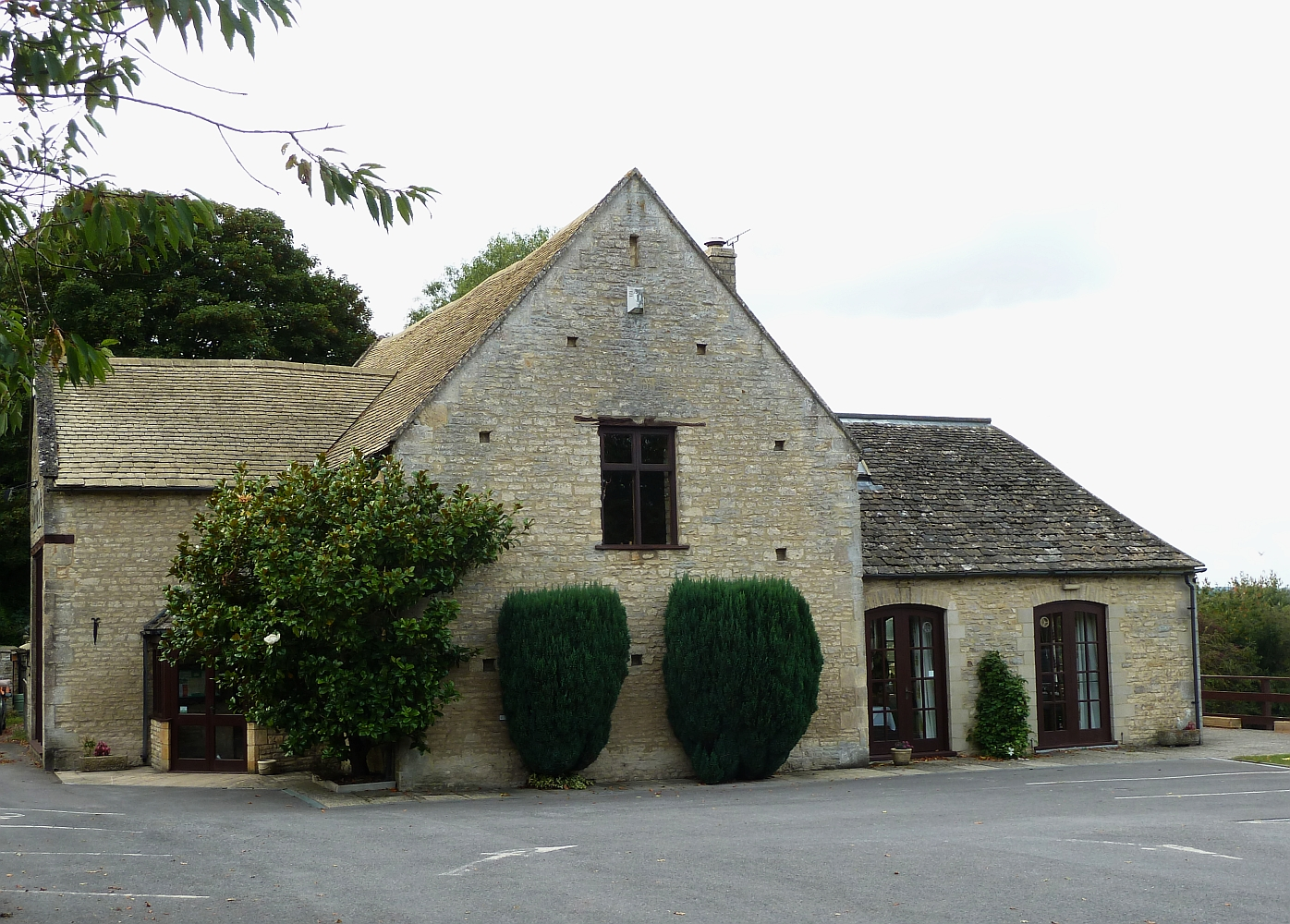
In 2014 when it was The Windmill

The building was originally built as a barn for a large farm. It was used as a soup kitchen by the Mitford sisters during the Second World War. In 1983, the barn was converted to a pub and restaurant by Alan and Jackie Walker, who named it The Windmill. The business was leased to tenants when Alan Walker died in 2013, and the property was subsequently abandoned. In 2024, it was sold to Jeremy Clarkson, reportedly for less than one million pounds, and renamed the Farmer's Dog.

Clarkson renovated and expanded the business, adding more catering, outdoor seating and some ancillary services using the marquee from The Grand Tour situated in the pub grounds. The unique selling point of the pub is that in order to fully back the efforts of British farming, it exclusively relies on produce made in Britain, not featuring anything including foreign ingredients, meaning that popular items such as Coca-Cola and coffee are unavailable as they cannot be produced locally. Service additions to the pub include an outdoor kitchen named the Farmer's Puppy, a butcher shop named Hops & Chops, and a farm shop named after the original situated on Clarkson's Diddly Squat Farm. The process was filmed for Clarkson's Farm series 4 and the re-opening on 23 August 2024 was attended by hundreds of customers who queued for hours.

Upon the pub's opening, Clarkson banned Prime Minister Keir Starmer, his Top Gear and Grand Tour colleague James May and later a local named Maddy Hornby. In December 2024, Leader of the Opposition and Conservative leader Kemi Badenoch was invited to the pub. He then banned all Labour MPs from his pub except Markus Campbell-Savours.

== See also ==
- Clarkson's Farm
