= Coach and Horses =

Coach and Horses may refer to:

- Coach and Horses, Bourton-on-the-Water, a pub in Gloucestershire, England
- Coach and Horses, Hill Street, a pub in Mayfair, London
- Coach and Horses, Isleworth, a pub in the London Borough of Hounslow
- Coach and Horses, Soho, a pub in the City of Westminster, London
- Coach and Horses, Weaste, a former pub in Salford, England
