= 2017–18 Brighton & Hove Albion W.F.C. season =

Brighton & Hove Albion
2017–18 season
- Chairman: Tony Bloom
- Manager: Hope Powell
- Stadium: Culver Road
- WSL 2: 2nd
- FA Cup: Fourth round
- League Cup: Group stage
Home colours	Away colours	Third colours

The 2017–18 Brighton & Hove Albion W.F.C season was the club's 27th season and first full season in the FA WSL 2. The club also completed in two domestic cup competitions, the women's FA Cup and FA WSL Cup. This was their final season to be playing matches at Culver Road in Lancing.

== Season overview ==
- Former England boss Hope Powell was appointed to manage the team in July 2017
- Brighton finished in second place in the WSL 2, winning 12 out of 18 matches.
- Doncaster Rovers Belles won the league but gave up their licence, Brighton were promoted instead to the fully professional FA WSL for the 2018–19 season.
