= Lisa Hogan =

Irish actress and model (born 1971)

Lisa Hogan (born 1971) is an Irish actress, former model, entrepreneur and television personality. She is best known for her appearances in the Amazon Prime Video series Clarkson's Farm (2021–present), where she co-manages the Diddly Squat Farm Shop with her partner, Jeremy Clarkson. She previously appeared in the comedy film Fierce Creatures (1997).

== Early life ==
Hogan was born in Dublin, Ireland, to Maurice Hogan (an architect who died when she was 14) and Arlene Underwood (a former model; later remarried to Raymond Keaveney, former director of the National Gallery of Ireland).

== Career ==
Hogan began her career as a model in the 1990s. In the early part of the decade she worked as a researcher and production assistant for John Cleese's company Fish Productions. This connection led to her first screen role as a sea lion keeper (credited as Sky in some contemporary reports) in the 1997 comedy film Fierce Creatures, which co-starred Cleese, Jamie Lee Curtis, Kevin Kline and Michael Palin.

In 2020 Hogan co-founded the Diddly Squat Farm Shop in Chadlington, Oxfordshire, with her partner Jeremy Clarkson. She has managed the shop and been involved in product development, including branded merchandise. Since the 2021 premiere of the Amazon Prime Video series Clarkson's Farm she has appeared regularly on screen as herself, contributing to farm operations and the running of the shop. She has also made guest appearances as herself on programmes including Loose Women in 2021 and Prue Leith's Cotswold Kitchen. In October 2025 she published her first book, My Animals and Other Eejits: Farming the Year at Diddly Squat. The book recounts a year on the farm, incorporating anecdotes from her earlier career as a model, actress and sculptor, as well as stories about the farm's animals. Hogan has additionally undertaken public roles such as lead fashion judge for the Best Dressed competition at the Dubai Duty Free Irish Derby.

== Personal life ==
Hogan was previously married to Dutch aristocrat and art collector Baron Steven Bentinck, a nephew of Baron Heini Thyssen. They married in the late 1990s, separated around 2005, and divorced in 2011.

In August 1996 she was the sole passenger on a private Learjet that crashed near RAF Northolt after a flight from Palma, Majorca; she and the pilots survived.

Since 2017, Hogan has been in a relationship with television presenter Jeremy Clarkson.
