= Hawkstone Lager =

English lager made by Jeremy Clarkson

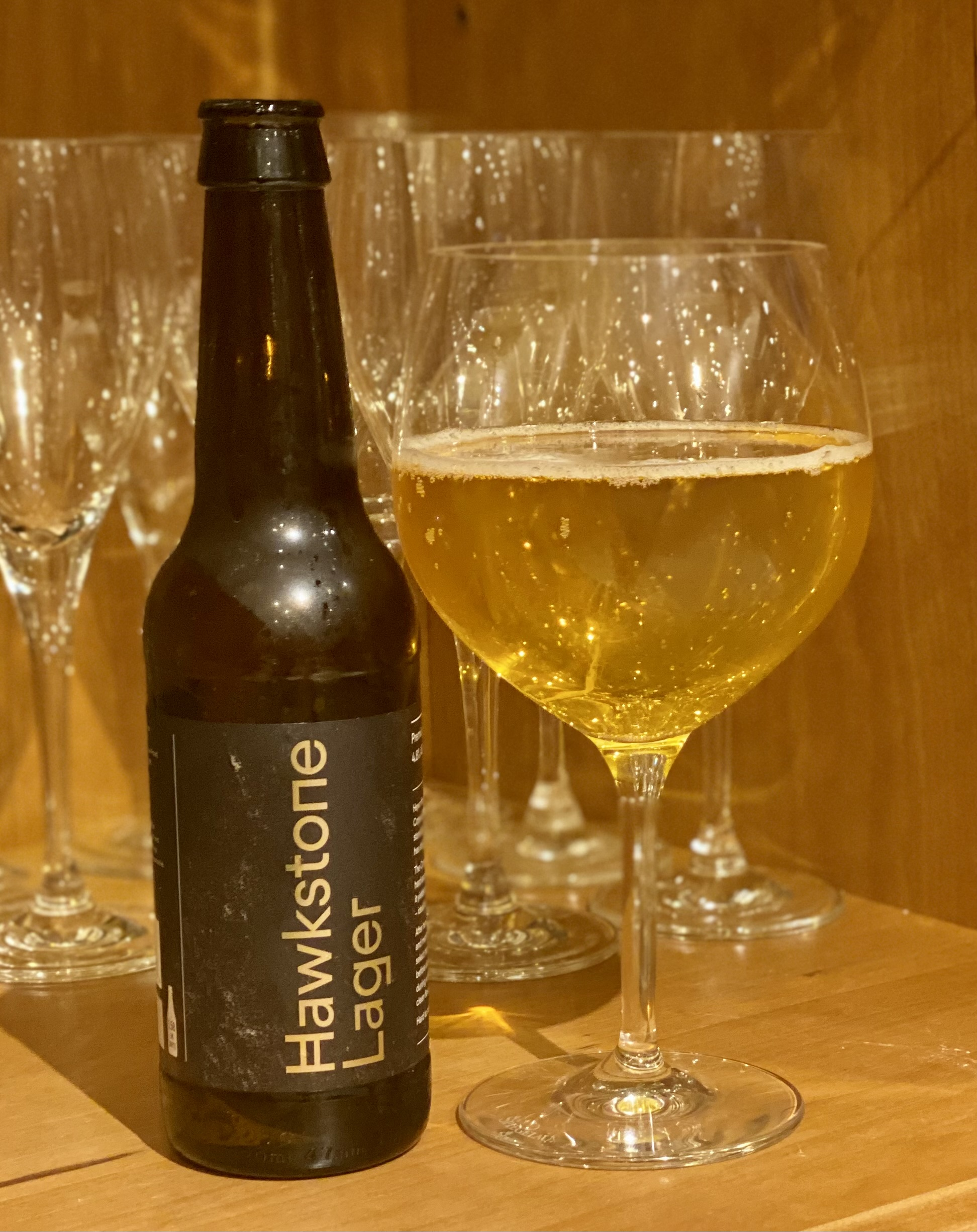
- Bottle and glass of Hawkstone Lager
- Type: Beer
- Manufacturer: Hawkstone Brewery
- Distributor: Craft Drink Company
- Origin: England, Oxfordshire
- Introduced: 2021
- Alcohol by volume: 4.8
- Style: Lager
- Ingredients: Barley

Hawkstone Lager is a lager created by television presenter and farmer Jeremy Clarkson using barley grown at his Diddly Squat Farm in Chipping Norton, Oxfordshire, England. It is brewed by Hawkstone Brewery near Bourton-on-the-Water, Gloucestershire.

== History ==
Jeremy Clarkson is a British television presenter and owner of Diddly Squat Farm in Oxfordshire featured in the Amazon Prime Video documentary Clarkson's Farm. Due to a lowering of government farm subsidies, in 2021 he decided to make a lager beer using barley grown on his farm. After consulting with his farm workers, he decided it should have a 4.8 ABV. Clarkson had to have the beer rebrewed after an initial attempt due to it failing a blind taste test against a nearby local brand of beer. It was originally planned to only be sold at Clarkson's Farm Shop, but was later sold online as well. The beer was criticised for competing with local brewers and potentially drawing business away from them.

Hawkstone Lager is distributed by the Craft Drink Co.

== Advertising ==
Clarkson claimed that he intended to call the beer "Lager McLagerface", but this was vetoed by the advertising agency for not conveying a premium image. It was named Hawkstone Lager after a prehistoric stone near Diddly Squat Farm. He produced a number of adverts for the beer to be advertised on television in the United Kingdom, but these were banned by the Advertising Standards Authority, reportedly on the grounds that the first contained Clarkson saying the phrase "fuck me, that's good", the second for Clarkson saying the beer was better than Birmingham, and the third because it promoted alcohol being served irresponsibly as it featured Clarkson drinking the lager in the morning before going to work. When Hawkstone Lager was released, it became the top-selling beer on Amazon. In January 2022, Clarkson announced that the beer would be sold on draught in pubs in Oxfordshire.

In 2024, Waitrose became the first supermarket chain to sell Hawkstone.
