= Agricultural Engineers Association =

UK trade association

The Agricultural Engineers Association
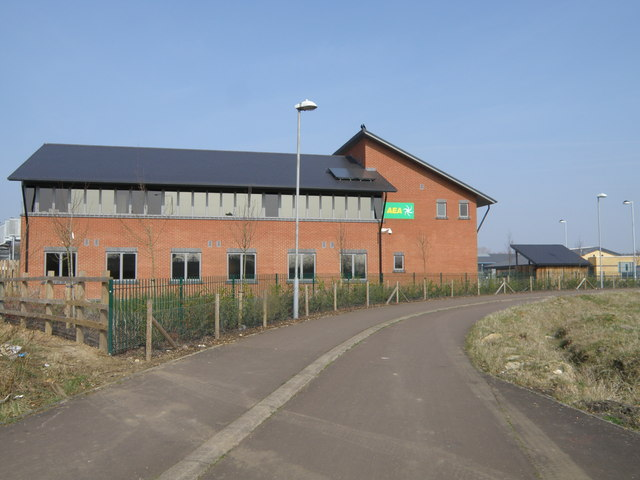
- Type: Private
- Industry: Agriculture
- Headquarters: Peterborough, Cambridgeshire, England PE7 8JB, Peterborough, United Kingdom
- Area served: Europe
- Services: commercial, export, legal, statistics and technical support, shows
- Website: www.aea.uk.com

Agricultural Engineers Association (AEA) is a trade association in the United Kingdom which represents manufacturers and importers of agricultural machinery and outdoor equipment to Government, Parliament, and the media.

== History ==
The AEA was established in 1875 to promote the commercial, technical and trade interests of British manufacturers and suppliers of agricultural machinery and celebrated its 125th anniversary in London on 18 April 2000. It was incorporated in 1955 as private company limited by guarantee without share capital. It now also champions the cause of manufacturers of outdoor power equipment and its current members cover a broad spectrum of manufacturers of land based equipment.

The AEA issues trade statistics and commentary for the national media and organises large events for the industry such as Tillage Live, an annual UK cultivations event focusing on all aspects of crop establishment, and ScotGrass, a triennial grassland event.

The AEA became a member of the Engineering and Machinery Alliance, UK, in 2010.

== Objectives ==
- To safeguard and promote the interests of manufacturers and wholesale distributors
- To promote, support or oppose legislation or other measures affecting the interests of the industry
- To co-operate and negotiate with Government and other bodies interested or concerned in export and import trade
- To promote, maintain and assist scientific research, invention and technical development
- To promote, conduct, manage and co-operate with Associations, Clubs, Societies and other bodies in promoting, conducting or managing shows, exhibitions and demonstrations
