= 2017–18 FA WSL 2 =

FA WSL 2
- Season: 2017–18
- Champions: Doncaster Rovers Belles
- Matches: 90
- Goals: 325 (3.61 per match)
- Top goalscorer: Jessica Sigsworth (15 goals)
- Biggest home win: Doncaster Rovers Belles 6–0 Aston Villa (29 October 2017); Tottenham Hotspur 6–0 Watford (22 February 2018)
- Biggest away win: Watford 0–5 Sheffield (16 May 2018)
- Highest scoring: Tottenham Hotspur 6–3 Durham (29 April 2018)

The 2017–18 FA WSL 2 was the fifth edition of the FA WSL 2 since it was formed in 2014. It was the first season of FA WSL 2 which ran as a winter league. It started in September 2017 and ended in May 2018, with ten teams competing in the league.

There was no promotion or relegation based on results at the end of the season due to the league's restructure.

== Teams ==
Locations of the 2017–18 WSL 2 teams

Team	Location	Ground	Capacity	2016 season	Spring Series
Aston Villa	Tamworth	The Lamb Ground	4,000	7th	4th
Brighton & Hove Albion	Lancing	Culver Road	2,000	1st, 2015–16 WPL	6th
Doncaster Rovers Belles	Doncaster	Keepmoat Stadium	15,231	9th, FA WSL 1	2nd
Durham	Durham	New Ferens Park	3,000	4th	5th
London Bees	Canons Park	The Hive Stadium	5,176	6th	7th
Millwall Lionesses	Bermondsey	St. Paul's Sports Ground	2,500	8th	3rd
Oxford United	Marston	Court Place Farm	3,200	9th	10th
Sheffield	Dronfield	Coach and Horses	2,000	5th	9th
Tottenham Hotspur	Cheshunt	The Stadium	3,000	1st, 2016–17 WPL	n/a
Watford	Kings Langley	Global Metcorp Stadium	1,000	10th	8th

=== Table ===
Pos	Team	Pld	W	D	L	GF	GA	GD	Pts	Promotion or relegation
1	Doncaster Rovers Belles (C, R)	18	15	2	1	52	15	+37	47	Obtained then gave up Tier 2 licence. Relegation to the Northern Premier Division
2	Brighton & Hove Albion (P)	18	12	1	5	35	26	+9	37	Awarded a Tier 1 licence
3	Millwall Lionesses (Note: Millwall Lionesses had three points deducted for fielding an ineligible player in their first game of the season against Watford.)	18	12	3	3	40	23	+17	36	
4	Durham	18	11	2	5	44	26	+18	35	
5	Sheffield (R)	18	9	1	8	40	31	+9	28	Obtained then gave up Tier 2 licence. Relegation to the Northern Premier Division
6	London Bees	18	6	5	7	29	32	−3	23	
7	Tottenham Hotspur	18	6	4	8	32	34	−2	22	
8	Oxford United (R)	18	3	3	12	24	41	−17	12	Failed to obtain a Tier 2 licence. Relegation to the Southern Premier Division
9	Aston Villa	18	3	2	13	21	40	−19	11	
10	Watford (R)	18	1	1	16	8	57	−49	4	Failed to obtain a Tier 2 licence. Relegation to the Southern Premier Division

Source: FA WSL
Rules for classification: 1) Points; 2) Goal difference; 3) Number of goals scored
(C) Champions; (P) Promoted; (R) Relegated

=== Results ===
Home \ Away	AST	BRI	DON	DUR	LON	MIL	OXF	SHE	TOT	WAT
Aston Villa	—	0–1	0–4	1–3	3–3	0–2	1–0	3–4	1–1	4–0
Brighton & Hove Albion	2–1	—	1–0	3–2	3–1	0–3	5–1	1–0	2–0	4–1
Doncaster Rovers Belles	6–0	4–1	—	3–1	3–1	2–2	4–0	3–2	3–0	3–1
Durham	3–0	4–0	1–2	—	0–0	2–1	1–1	3–2	2–1	4–0
London Bees	2–1	2–1	1–4	1–3	—	2–3	2–1	0–0	1–2	3–1
Millwall Lionesses	2–1	4–3	0–1	3–2	1–1	—	1–0	2–1	4–1	3–1
Oxford United	3–1	2–2	2–2	2–4	2–3	2–4	—	1–0	1–2	1–2
Sheffield	2–1	1–4	1–2	0–4	3–1	3–0	4–1	—	4–3	4–0
Tottenham Hotspur	2–0	0–1	1–4	6–3	1–1	1–1	2–1	2–4	—	6–0
Watford	0–3	0–1	0–2	0–2	0–4	0–4	1–3	0–5	1–1	—

Updated to match(es) played on 20 May 2018. Source: FA WSL
Legend: Blue = home team win; Yellow = draw; Red = away team win.

=== Top goalscorers ===
As of 20 May 2018.

Rank	Player	Team	Goals
1	(England) Jessica Sigsworth	Doncaster Rovers Belles	15
2	(Jamaica) Melissa Johnson	Sheffield F.C. Ladies	12
3	(Scotland) Kirsty Hanson	Doncaster Rovers Belles	11
3	(England) Beth Hepple	Durham W.F.C.	11
5	(England) Charlie Devlin	Millwall Lionesses	9

== See also ==
- 2017–18 FA WSL Cup
