= Coach and Horses, Bourton-on-the-Water =

Public house in Gloucestershre, England

Coach and Horses
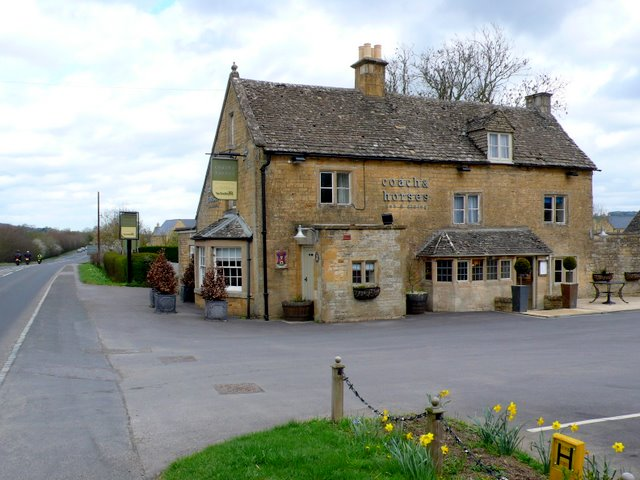
- The pub in 2011

- Location within Gloucestershire

General information
- Location: Fosse Way, Bourton-on-the-Water, Gloucestershire, England
- Coordinates: 51°53′39″N 1°45′29″W
- Year built: 18th century

Listed Building – Grade II
- Official name: Coach and Horses public house
- Designated: 12 August 1983
- Reference no.: 1341629

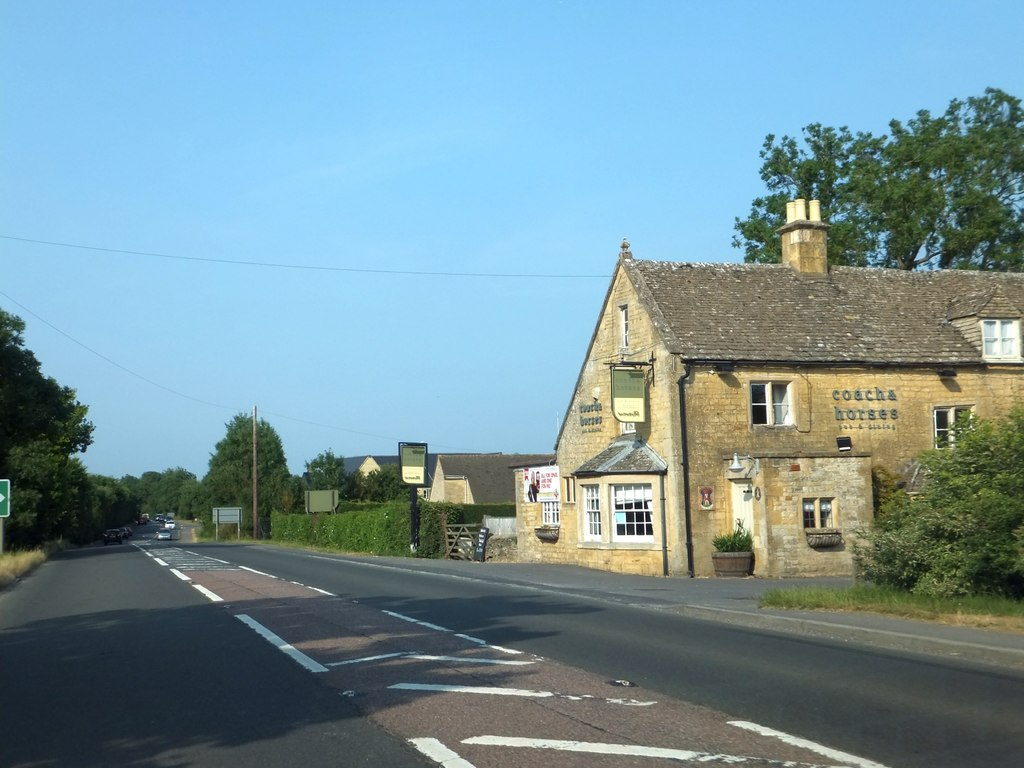
The pub in 2013.

The Coach and Horses is a public house on the A429 Stow Road (Fosse Way) near Bourton-on-the-Water, a village in Gloucestershire, England. It stands on a plot of 1.25 acres (0.51 ha) and has a floorspace of 3,652 square feet (339.3 m^{2}). Built in the 18th century, it has been listed at Grade II on the National Heritage List for England since 1983. The building is constructed from coursed rubble with a roof of Cotswold stone.

In 1891 it was owned by the Cheltenham Original Brewery. The stables to the rear were converted into rooms to let in 2001. The property was marketed by Savills in 2025 for offers around £895,000 + VAT.

In 2024 the Oxford Mail reported that Jeremy Clarkson was interested in buying the pub, which stands opposite Hawkstone Brewery, a business in which he holds a partial ownership stake. Clarkson later claimed in an episode of Clarkson's Farm that Cotswold District councillors "didn't have a single positive thing to say" about his plans after a pre-planning application meeting and were concerned he might be successful with the pub. Cotswold District Council told BBC News that it "absolutely refut[ed]" Clarkson's claims and said it had held "several positive meetings" regarding his proposals.
