= Gerald Cooper =

British farmhand (born 1947)

Gerald R Cooper
- Born: February 1947 (age 79); Chipping Norton, Oxfordshire, England
- Occupation: Farmhand
- Years active: 2021-
- Television: Clarkson's Farm

Gerald Cooper is a British farmhand who became famous after appearing on Clarkson's Farm. He is an expert in dry stone walling and maintains the walls on Diddly Squat Farm. His other tasks include combine harvesting, which he has done for over fifty years.

He has a strong West Country English accent and, as a running gag, the show portrays this as incomprehensible to Jeremy Clarkson. Farming broadcaster Adam Henson has met Cooper several times and said that the show exaggerates his speech by overlaying Cooper's conversation with a double track.

Cooper was diagnosed with prostate cancer but underwent treatment and was declared cancer-free in 2024. He then started a horse racing syndicate to raise money for Prostate Cancer UK. Shares in a gelding called "The Mullet", after Cooper's mullet hairstyle, were sold for £28,500. The horse is being trained in National Hunt racing by Charlie Longsdon and any winnings will also be donated to charity.
