= Fierce Creatures =

1997 film by Robert Young and Fred Schepisi

- Theatrical release poster
- Directed by: Robert Young; Fred Schepisi
- Written by: John Cleese; Iain Johnstone
- Produced by: Michael Shamberg; John Cleese
- Starring: John Cleese; Jamie Lee Curtis; Kevin Kline; Michael Palin; Ronnie Corbett; Carey Lowell; Robert Lindsay
- Cinematography: Ian Baker; Adrian Biddle
- Edited by: Robert Gibson
- Music by: Jerry Goldsmith
- Production company: Jersey Films
- Distributed by: Universal Pictures
- Release dates: January 24, 1997 (United States); February 14, 1997 (United Kingdom)
- Running time: 89 minutes
- Countries: United Kingdom; United States
- Language: English
- Budget: $25 million
- Box office: $40 million

Fierce Creatures is a 1997 farcical comedy film. While not literally a sequel, Fierce Creatures is a spiritual successor to the 1988 film A Fish Called Wanda. Both films star John Cleese, Jamie Lee Curtis, Kevin Kline and Michael Palin. Fierce Creatures was written by John Cleese and directed by Robert Young and Fred Schepisi. The film was dedicated to Gerald Durrell and Peter Cook. Some scenes were filmed at Jersey Zoo, a zoological park founded by Durrell.

== Plot ==
Willa Weston arrives in Atlanta to take a high-ranking position in a company recently acquired by Octopus Inc.'s owner, Rod McCain. When he informs her he has already sold the company, she then agrees to run another recent acquisition, Marwood Zoo. She is to create a business model that can be used for multiple zoos in the future. Rod McCain's son Vincent, who is attracted to Willa, announces that he will join her at the zoo. The zoo's newly appointed director is a retired Hong Kong Police Force officer and former Octopus Television employee, Rollo Lee. To meet Octopus's revenue target of 20% from all assets, he institutes a "fierce creatures" theme. Believing dangerous and violent animals will attract more visitors, all animals not meeting those requirements must go.

All the animal keepers, including spider-handler Bugsy, try to change Rollo's mind. One such attempt involves getting him to kill some of the cutest animals himself, but Rollo sees through their prank and fakes the animals' extermination. He keeps the animals in his bedroom which later causes Willa and Vincent to believe he is having an orgy with female staff. Rollo discovers that several staff members are faking animal attack injuries. He fires several warning shots at those responsible and Reggie rushes in, believing that one of them is shot. Rollo then finds a visitor who has had a genuine accident but, not believing it is real, tastes her blood whilst loudly proclaiming that it is fake. Willa and Vincent, upon seeing this fiasco, demote Rollo to middle management. Vince even threatens to fire him if he does not cease his apparent activities with the female staff.

Vince covers both the zoo and animals alike with advertisements after garnering sponsors, dresses the staff in ridiculous outfits, and installs an artificial panda in one of the enclosures. His continued attempts to seduce Willa fail, while she comes to enjoy working at the zoo after connecting with a silverback gorilla. Willa finds herself attracted to Rollo after becoming fascinated by his apparent ability to attract multiple women. When he tries to discuss Vince's marketing plan, she suggests dinner, but she postpones when she remembers Rod is coming from Atlanta to discuss the running of the zoo.

Worried that the visit might be part of a plan to close the zoo, Rollo and the zookeepers bug Rod's hotel room to find out. Although the plan goes awry, they discover he wants to sell it to Japanese investors who'll turn it into a golf course. Also, he plans to have himself cryogenically frozen whenever he gets ill so Vince would never inherit anything. Discovering Vince has stolen sponsorship money he raised, Willa warns him to return it, or she will tell Rod. As Rollo attempts to work out how the theft can be traced, he and Willa finally kiss, just as Vince arrives to return the money. A confrontation then ensues as Willa, Rollo, Bugsy, and several others attempt to stop Vince from running off with the money.

Rod arrives just as Vince, who is holding a gun, is being subdued and announces the police are on their way to arrest him for stealing. Vince tries and fails to shoot his father, but then Bugsy takes the pistol and accidentally shoots Rod between the eyes. In the panic that follows, a plan emerges to fool Neville, Rod's business associate, and the arriving police. The keepers work together to dress Vince up as Rod, as he can imitate his father's accent fairly well. When they arrive, Vince (as Rod) tells them that he has rewritten the will, specifying that the zoo will become a trust for the caretakers while Vince will inherit everything else, and he asks all of them to be witnesses.

After signing the new will, Vince locks himself in a caretaker hut where they fake Rod's suicide. Although Neville becomes suspicious, he is left dumbstruck when he finds his boss's dead body in the hut. Now free, the zookeepers destroy the evidence of McCain's ownership. Vince becomes the new CEO of Octopus, while Willa and Rollo happily begin a new life together while continuing to run the zoo.

== Cast ==
- John Cleese as Rollo Lee (né Leach), the twin brother of Archie Leach, Cleese's character from A Fish Called Wanda.
- Jamie Lee Curtis as Willa Weston
- Kevin Kline as Rod McCain/Vince McCain
- Michael Palin as Adrian 'Bugsy' Malone
- Robert Lindsay as Sydney Lotterby
- Ronnie Corbett as Reggie Sea Lions
- Carey Lowell as Cub Felines
- Bille Brown as Neville
- Derek Griffiths as Gerry Ungulates
- Maria Aitken as Di Harding
- Cynthia Cleese as Pip Small Mammals
- Richard Ridings as Hugh Primates
- Gareth Hunt as Inspector Masefield
- Tom Georgeson as Sealion Spectator
- John Bardon as Sealion Spectator
- Jack Davenport as Student Zoo Keeper
- Lisa Hogan as a Sea lion keeper

== Production ==
The movie was based on a sketch written by Palin and Terry Jones in 1967 for Comedy Playhouse about a zoo that is taken over by a man who just wants to stock it with dangerous animals. Cleese began writing the script in 1992 and shooting began on 15 May 1995. The first director was Robert Young who had previously made commercials with Cleese. Ronnie Corbett later recalled in his memoir that the shoot "was a struggle from the start. There is always a sort of gloom and a feeling of unease on a film set when the words are not quite right, and, in this case, there were too many good people in the film with not enough for them to do. It was difficult for the director Robert Young because everyone was coming up with new ideas all the time and trying to give him guidance."

The film was completed in August 1995 and previewed in November of that year. Palin recorded in his diary:

No shortage of laughter, and it was good and consistent too, right through the first 50 minutes of the movie. Then it began to sag as the plot became more convoluted and just about everything to do with Kevin’s Vince McCain character failed — especially exposing himself to the tiger. But there were good moments, well received, right up to the end.

=== Reshoots ===
Preview audiences expressed dissatisfaction with the ending, and in February 1996 the decision was made to reshoot this, along with some other sequences. These additional scenes could not be filmed until August 1996 because of the availability of the cast, in particular Palin who was making Full Circle with Michael Palin. Cleese and Johnstone worked on a new ending with William Goldman. The delay meant that director Robert Young was busy on pre-production for Jane Eyre, so Cleese hired Fred Schepisi, with whom he had been discussing making a version of Don Quixote, to direct the new scenes. The reshoots took five weeks and cost $7 million. Schepisi claims he tried to get the producers to take out the opening 15 minutes, which was done for a test screening, but then some of this footage was put back in, which the director thought killed the movie.

Robert Lindsay wrote in his memoirs: "Jamie Lee Curtis and Kevin Kline, who are both fantastic people, had tough American lawyers and agents around them throughout the shoot and were able to dictate changes to their benefit and to our detriment." Corbett recalled that Schepisi "was full of confidence and imagination, but even then it didn’t really turn out right — which confirmed my theory that there is a limit to the amount of tweaking you can do on these occasions."

In November, Palin wrote: "Word is that the Monday screening and 'focus group' out on Long Island didn't go well. Only 58% returned the good to very good. Fred [Schepisi] then edited out ten minutes that weren't working and scores went up by 15% on the Wednesday screening. So, after all these years of time, energy, money and hard graft, FC looks likely to be a 90-minute quickie, its shape and content decided eventually by 20 people in Long Island. JC's 'message' scenes — all his indignation at the system, his invective against the modem management style — have virtually disappeared." When Palin saw the film in December he wrote "It's a short film now — 93 minutes — stripped of all pretensions, and generally honed to comedy scenes that deliver good farce and well-hit one-liners. It's a solid, aggressive piece of work. Kevin and Jamie attack; John defends well; and I'm quite sidelined, stuck amongst the keepers. The keepers collective in Fierce Creatures fulfils the same sort of role as Ken Pile in Wanda."

== Reception ==
=== Critical ===
On Rotten Tomatoes, the film has a score of 53% based on 32 reviews with an average rating of 5.58/10. The site's critical consensus reads "Fierce Creatures reunites A Fish Called Wanda's talented ensemble for a comedy that, while not without its moments, suffers from diminishing returns". Metacritic, which uses a weighted average, assigned the film a score of 62 out of 100, based on 20 critics, indicating "generally favorable" reviews.

Roger Ebert awarded the film two and a half out of four stars, and compared it unfavourably to A Fish Called Wanda, stating: "It lacks the hair-trigger timing, the headlong rush into comic illogic, that made Wanda so special."

According to Palin, Kline told him "the problem was that John is at his best when creating awful people (Fawlty, Otto, etc.) and least convincing when trying to write warm, friendly, decent ones (his own character as Archie in Wanda an exception). I think he’s right. John is happiest when he’s on the attack. And funniest too."

=== Box office ===
The film grossed $9 million in the United States and Canada, £4 million ($7 million) in the United Kingdom and $24 million in the rest of the world, for a worldwide total of $40 million.

Cleese has since stated that following up A Fish Called Wanda with a second film had been a mistake. When asked in 2008 by his friend, director and restaurant critic Michael Winner what he would do differently if he could live his life again, Cleese responded: "I wouldn't have married Alyce Faye Eichelberger and I wouldn't have made Fierce Creatures."

== Notes ==
- Palin, Michael (2014). Travelling to Work: Diaries 1988–1998.
