= Granular applicator =

Machine that applies grain fertilizers or pesticides to crops

Granular applicator is a machine that applies granular fertiliser, pesticide, such as slug pellets or Avadex, or insecticide.

Granular applicators are used for precision application of solids to improve crop yields and quality. Application rates are often controlled electronically to improve accuracy.

== Types of granular applicators ==
- Demountable
- Self-propelled

== Granular applicator manufacturers ==
=== UK ===
- Lite-Trac
- Horstine
- Opico

=== America ===
- Sutton Agricultural Enterprises Inc
- Gandy

=== Canada ===
- Valmar
