= Coach and Horses, Isleworth =

Pub in Isleworth, London

Coordinates: 51°28′46″N 0°19′13″W

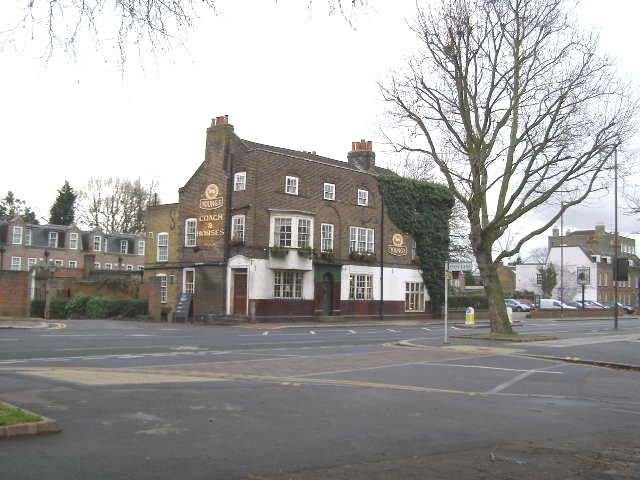
The Coach and Horses

The Coach and Horses is a Grade II listed public house at London Road, Isleworth, London.

It was built in the 18th century, with later alterations. Charles Dickens mentions the pub in his novel Oliver Twist.
