= Grassland & Muck =

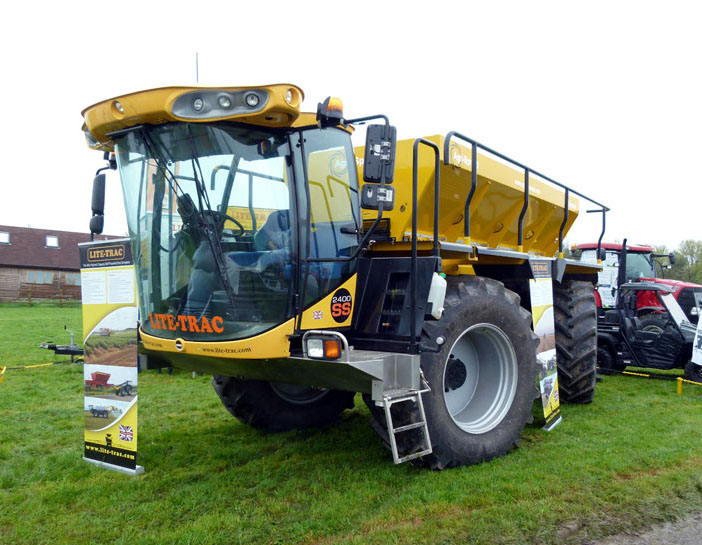
A Lite-Trac Agri-Spread lime and fertilizer spreader at Grassland & Muck 2011

Grassland & Muck is a triennial event for the industry which takes place in the United Kingdom. It showcases the latest technology and business information on forage production, harvesting and utilisation as well as the latest in muck management and application, attracting over 12,000 livestock farmers and contractors.

The event hosts over 250 exhibitors on 190 acres of land. Machinery demonstrations are the highlight of the event with all the leading manufacturers bringing and showcasing the latest grassland and muck handling machinery in action. The event also provides technical advice on grassland management and all aspects of muck and slurry. In 2014, technical forms were run at the event, featuring a range of expert speakers, on various livestock production issues.

== Event dates ==
The next Grassland and Muck event is scheduled to take place 19–20 May 2021. The COVID-19 pandemic caused 2020's cancellation.
