= Kaleb Cooper =

English farmer and TV personality (born 1998)

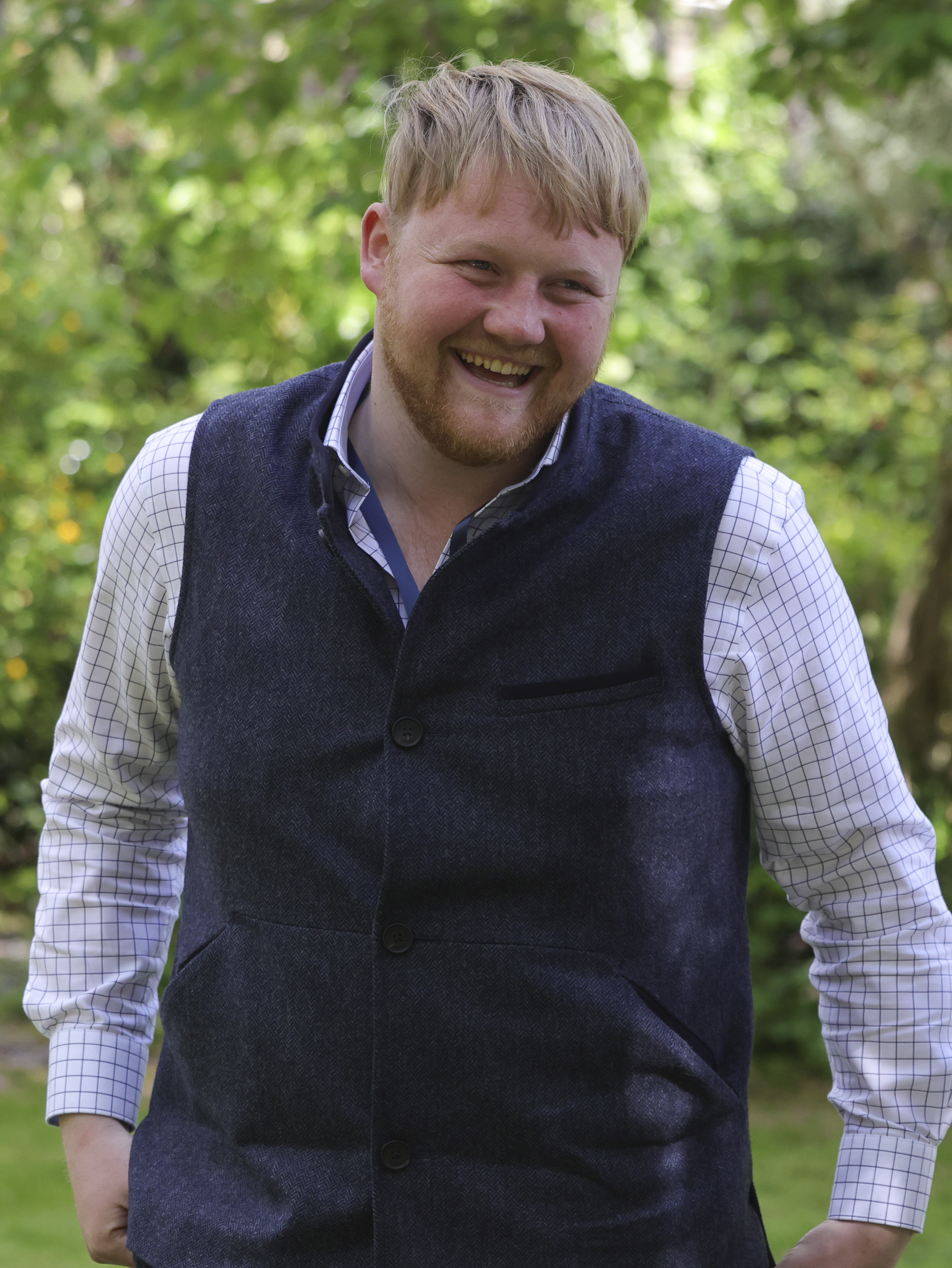
- Cooper in 2023
- Born: Kaleb Wayne Cooper; 2 July 1998 (age 28); Chipping Norton, Oxfordshire, England
- Occupations: Farmer; media personality; author
- Years active: 2021–present
- Employer: Jeremy Clarkson
- Television: Clarkson's Farm
- Children: 3

Kaleb Wayne Cooper (born 2 July 1998) is an English farmer, media personality and author. He is best known for appearing on farming documentary show Clarkson's Farm (2021–present), assisting Jeremy Clarkson. He also has written books such as The World According to Kaleb, and has toured with a live show.

== Early life ==
Kaleb Wayne Cooper was born in Chipping Norton, Oxfordshire, England. He does not come from a farming background. His parents divorced when he was 12. He began farming when he was 13, rearing hens and selling their eggs, and by helping out at a dairy farm.

== Career ==
He rose to public prominence in 2021, when he appeared in Clarkson's Farm on Amazon Prime Video as an experienced farm hand helping novice farmer Jeremy Clarkson. He had previously worked on the farm when it was managed by Howard Pauling.

The British Farming Awards have established the "Kaleb Cooper New Entrant of the Year Award" for candidates aged 6–17 who are new to farming. They showcase the dedication and hard work of children and teens starting a farming endeavour.

In 2025 Prime Video commissioned a four-part show called Kaleb: Down Under that will see Cooper go to Australia as he embarks on his first solo trip to one of the world's biggest farming markets.

=== Television ===
Year	Channel	Title	Role	Notes
2021–present	Amazon Prime Video	Clarkson's Farm	Himself	
2024	Amazon Prime Video	The World According to Kaleb – On Tour	Himself	
TBC	Amazon Prime Video	Kaleb: Down Under	Himself	

== Personal life ==
Cooper married his wife Taya in 2026, the couple have three children.

== Tour ==
- The World According To Kaleb: Kaleb Goes On Tour (2024)

== Books ==
- Cooper, Kaleb (13 October 2022). The World According to Kaleb. Quercus. ISBN 978-1529424775.
- Cooper, Kaleb (12 October 2023). Britain According to Kaleb: The Wonderful World of Country Life. Quercus. ISBN 978-1529424812.
- Cooper, Kaleb (17 October 2024). Life According to Kaleb. Quercus. ISBN 978-1529437881.
- Cooper, Kaleb (11 September 2025). Kaleb's Farmyard Tales. Hachette Children's Group. ISBN 978-1526367761.
