= Fox and Pheasant =

Pub in London, England

The Fox and Pheasant
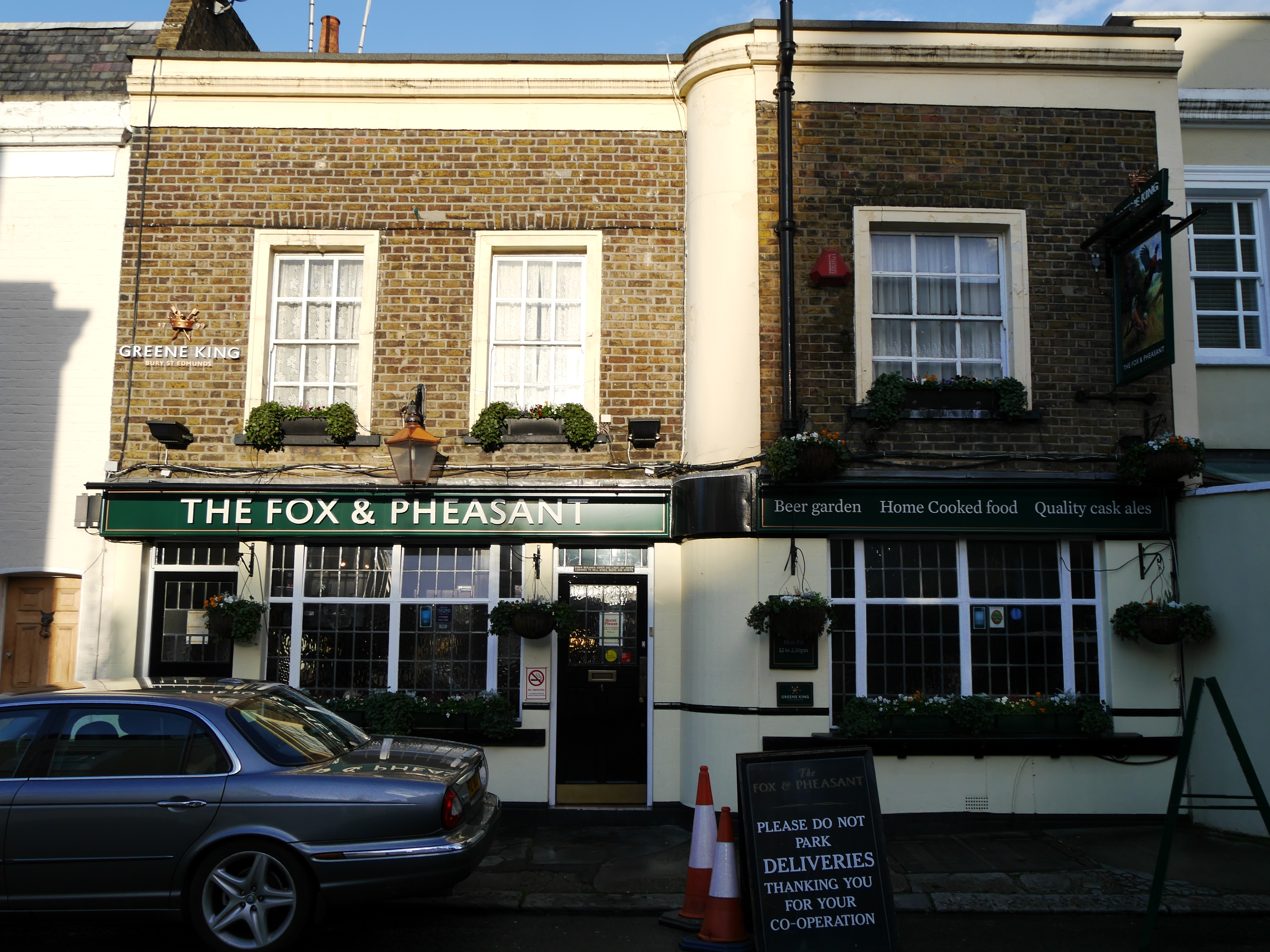
- The Fox and Pheasant

- Location within Royal Borough of Kensington and Chelsea Location within Greater London

General information
- Location: 1 Billing Road, Chelsea, London, England
- Coordinates: 51.4821°N 0.1880°W

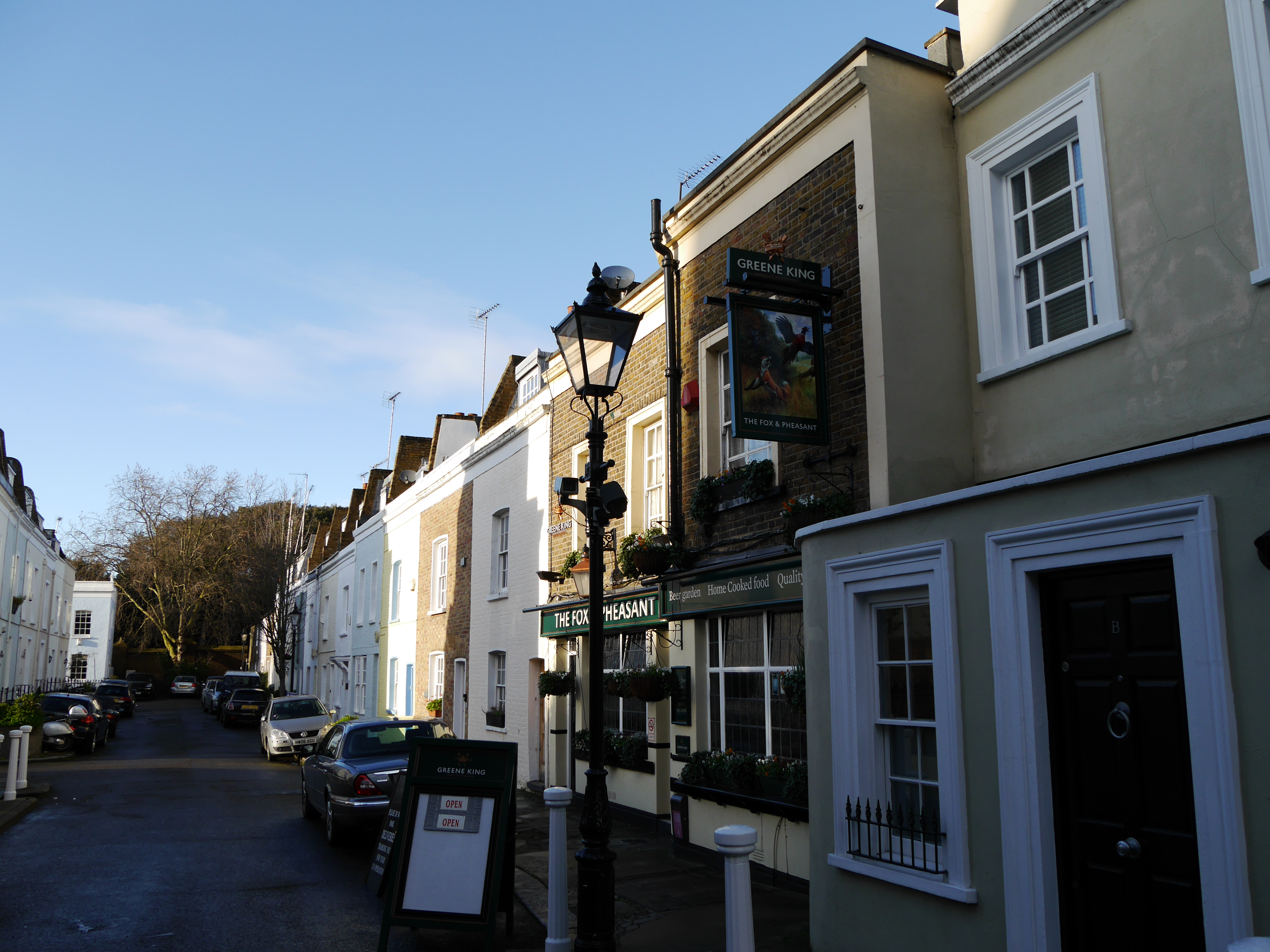
Billing Street

The Fox and Pheasant is a pub at 1 Billing Road, Chelsea, London SW10 9UJ.

The Fox and Pheasant Public House was built c.1846-8 on land acquired by Edward Gingell from William Allen. Allen was said to have been an unreasonable and litigious man and the odd curved section dividing the frontage of the pub could derive from his wrangling over the sale of the land or the line of the buildings.

It was originally called the Bedford Arms, then the Prince of Wales ten years later, and in 1965 it was renamed the Fox & Pheasant. It was fully refitted in about 1930, and that interior remains largely unchanged today.

It is on Campaign for Real Ale's National Inventory of Historic Pub Interiors and is part of the Billings conservation area.

In 2017, The Fox and Pheasant was sold by Greene King and bought by singer James Blunt. It went through major restoration, and re-opened on 27 June 2018.
