= Hawkstone Brewery =

Brewery in Cheltenham, Gloucestershire, England

- Industry: Microbrewery
- Headquarters: Bourton-on-the-Water, England, UK
- Website: www.hawkstone.com

Hawkstone Brewery is a microbrewery based in Bourton-on-the-Water, England. As well as beer, they also produce cider, vodka and gin.

Cotswolds Brewing Co. was founded in 2005 by Emma and Rick Keene. The couple started the brewery to focus on lager rather than ale. The first beer they released was a German-style lager called Cotswold Premium. In 2021, the brewery began to collaborate with Jeremy Clarkson to produce Hawkstone Lager and later the brewery was rebranded to Hawkstone. Clarkson bought a stake in the brewery from Emma Keene. In 2024, Hawkstone Brewery was named by The Sunday Times as being one of the top 100 fastest growing British companies. The company was listed in the 2025 list at number 23.

Hawkstone Brewery also sell gin. For legal reasons, they distill their gin at Thames Distillers Ltd. in London. The gin is made with hawthorn berries, verbena and lime. In 2023, the Hawkstone Brewery recalled a batch of Hawkstone Cider due to overfermentation, leading to them having the potential to spontaneously explode. In 2025, cans of their Hawkstone Spa Lager and Hawkstone Black were recalled because the containers failed to mention that they contained gluten.
