= Cereals Event =

Annual arable farming event in the UK

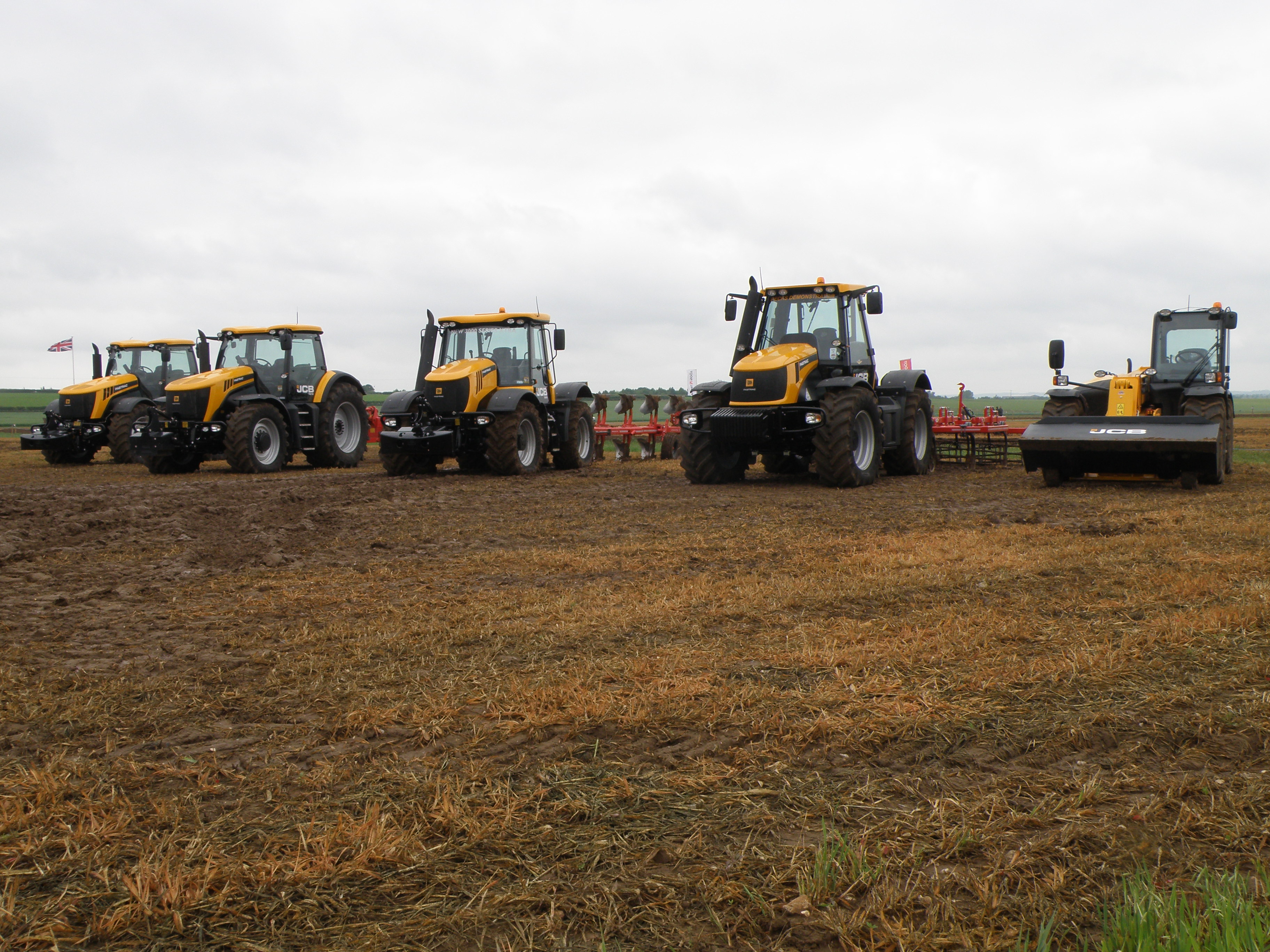

Cereals Event is the UK's largest arable farming event which takes place each year. The event attracts around 350 exhibitors and around 20,000 visitors and features 60ha of working demonstrations of agricultural equipment, stands, business advice and specialist services covering the entire arable industry.

== History ==
Cereals was launched in 1979.

== Event dates ==
- Cereals 2022 took place at Chrishall Grange Cambridgeshire and was hosted by Law Farming on 8–9 June 2022.
- Cereals 2023 tool place at a new venue, Thoresby Estate Nottinghamshire UK on 13–14 June 2023.
- Cereals 2026 took place at Diddly Squat Farm Shop in the Cotswolds on 10-11 June 2026 Address - Diddly Squat Farm, 5-12 Chipping Norton Road

Chadlington, Chipping Norton, Oxfordshire OX7 3PE United Kingdom

- Cereals 2027 will take place at a new venue, Heath Farm, Leadenham in Lincolnshire on 9-10 June 2027.
