= Farm shop =

Retail outlet for a farm

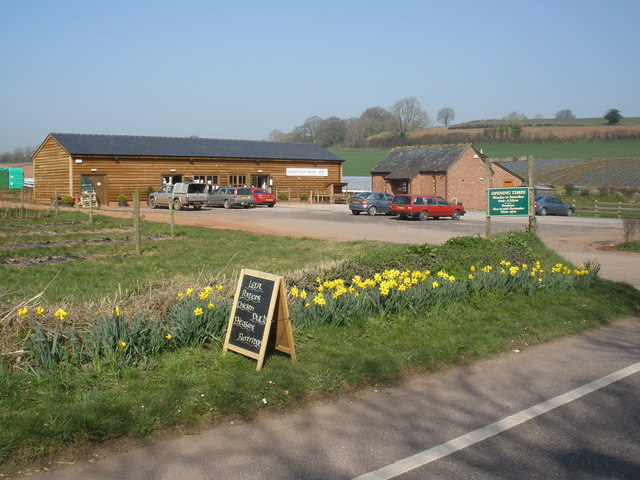
Halberton Court farm shop

A farm shop, or "farm stand" in the United States, is a type of retail outlet which usually sells produce directly from a farm. Some farm shops also resell related goods such as locally produced groceries, foods, drinks and delicatessen products.

In developed countries the number of farm shops is increasing as farms seek to diversify their sources of income in the face of financial pressures. Direct sales to the consumer allow farmers to retain a larger portion of the resulting profit than they can obtain by selling to a wholesaler or larger reseller. Many farm shops sell higher-margin premium goods such as organic produce of known local provenance in order to differentiate their offerings from those in supermarkets. Larger farm shops may target the leisure-shopping market, offering tea-rooms, gift shops and rural lifestyle products.

In recent years, especially in strongly agrarian regions and countries such as the United Kingdom, farm shops are commonly associated with garden centres and nurseries. Often, these garden centres provide a significant amount of support for the farm shop by attracting customers, and vice versa.

== See also ==
- Agritourism
- Farmers' market
- Pick-your-own
- Garden centres
