= LAMMA show =

Agricultural show in England

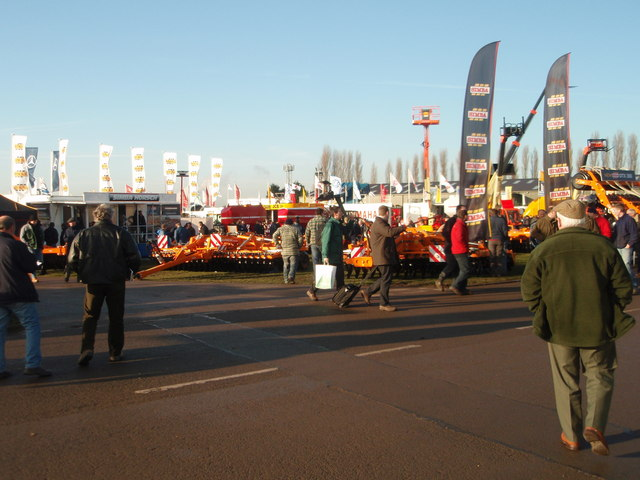
The 2009 show at the Newark and Notts Showground

LAMMA Show is the United Kingdom's leading agricultural machinery equipment and service show. Since 1982 the LAMMA show (which stands for the Lincolnshire Agricultural Machinery Manufacturers Association) has grown to over 900 exhibitors, with in excess of 40,000 attendees. Since 2012 the show has been owned by Briefing Media Ltd, the owners of the Farmer's Guardian.

== History ==
The show started in 1982 as a major showcase for the latest agricultural machinery for the local farms, established by small group of local agricultural equipment manufacturers from Lincolnshire, United Kingdom. The show has grown beyond recognition to become Britain's largest machinery show.

== Show dates ==
The show is traditionally held over 2 days in January each year. For 2026 the show will be held on Wednesday and Thursday 14 and 15 January.
