= Nissan Navara =

Pickup truck line

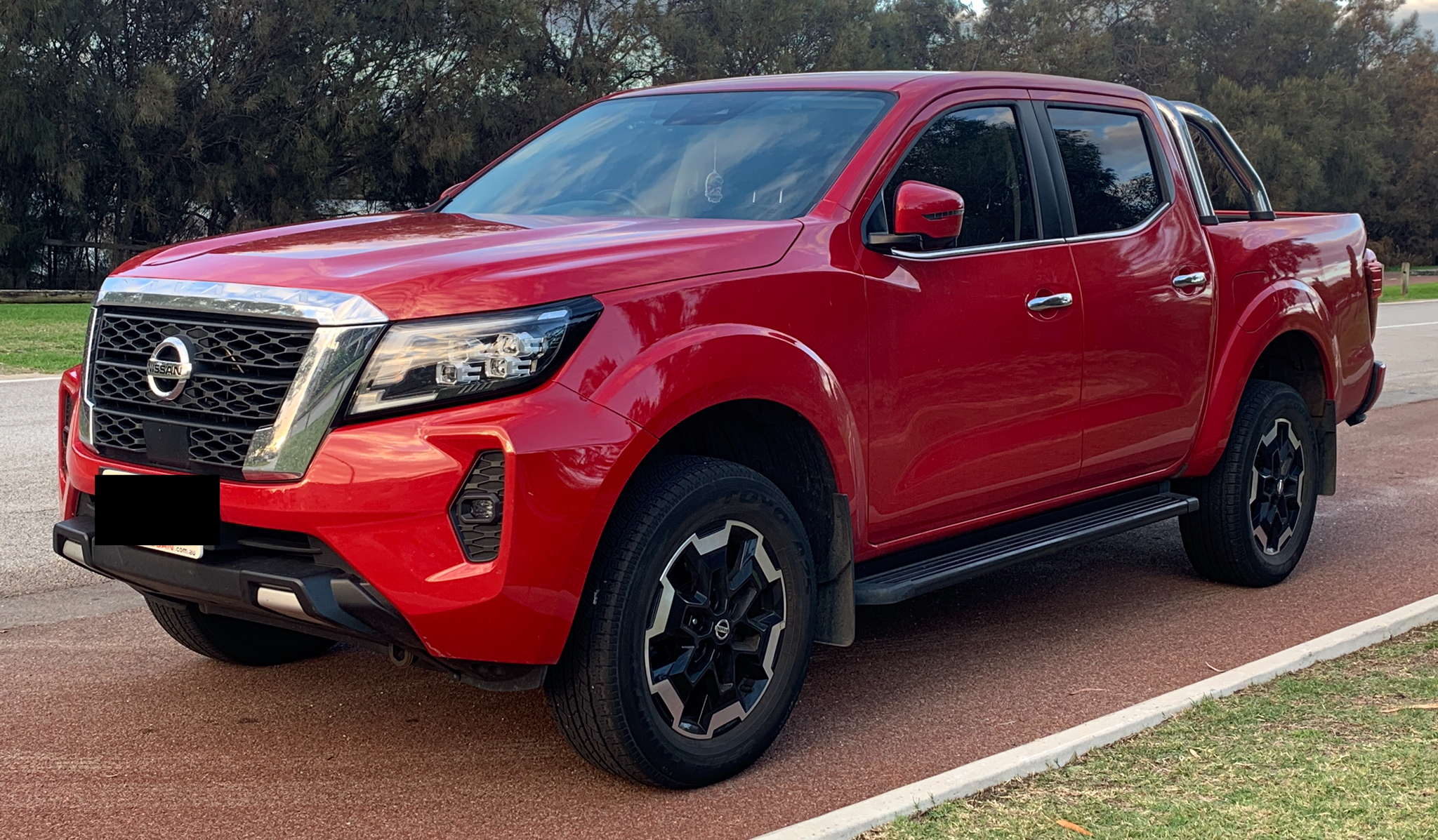
- 2021 Nissan Navara

Overview
- Manufacturer: Nissan
- Also called: Nissan Frontier; Nissan NP300; Mitsubishi Triton/L200 (2026–present)
- Production: 1985–present

Body and chassis
- Class: Compact pickup truck (D21/D22); Mid-size pickup truck (D40/D23/D27)
- Body style: 2-door pickup truck 4-door pickup truck
- Layout: Front-engine, rear-wheel-drive; Front-engine, four-wheel-drive
- Chassis: Body-on-frame

Chronology
- Predecessor: Datsun/Nissan 720
- Successor: Nissan Frontier (D41) (North America); Nissan Frontier Pro/Navara Pro (China, Middle East and the Philippines)

The Nissan Navara (Japanese: 日産・ナバラ, Hepburn: Nissan Nabara) is a nameplate used for Nissan pickup trucks with D21, D22, D40, D23 and D27 model codes. The nameplate has been used in Australia, New Zealand, Central America, South America, Asia, Europe, and South Africa. In North, Central and South America and some selected markets, it is marketed as the Nissan Frontier or Nissan NP300.

After more than ten years with the D21, Nissan unveiled the similar sized D22. It was replaced with the bigger, taller, longer D40 mid-size pickup. In 2014, Nissan released its successor, the D23, for international markets other than the U.S. and Canada. For these markets, it received the D41 Frontier in 2021 to replace the D40.

The Navara gets its name from the Navarre region of northern Spain. The European version was built at the Nissan Motor Ibérica factory in Barcelona.

== D21 series (1985) ==
Nissan D21
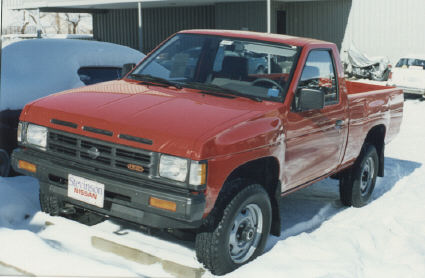
- 1990 Nissan Hardbody

Overview
- Also called: Nissan Hardbody; Nissan Datsun (Japan); Nissan Camiones (Mexico, 1993–2008); Nissan D21 (China, Chile); Nissan Big M (Thailand); Nissan PickUp; Nissan Hustler; Nissan Power Eagle; Nissan Pathfinder Eagle; Nissan King Cab; Nissan 850
- Production: U.S/Canada: November 1985 – 1997; Mexico: 1993–2008; China: April 1995 – January 1999; Thailand: 1986–1998; Philippines: 1987–1998

Body and chassis
- Class: Compact pickup truck (1986–1997)
- Body style: 2-door truck; 2-door king cab truck; 4-door truck
- Related: Nissan Pathfinder

The D21 generation was the successor to the Datsun 720, sold as the Nissan Datsun Truck in Japan. The name Navara was used in some markets such as Australia / New Zealand.

Unlike previous generations, this model was available worldwide in two body styles. The "A" body was designed in Japan, and was available in single or dual cab variants, while the "S" body King Cab was designed in the United States, at Nissan's styling studios in San Diego, California. Each version had unique front styling, with the American version having a different bonnet, and wider flared front guards. In a few countries, such as Australia, both versions were sold. This was also assembled in Greece for the local market, where it was marketed as the Nissan Pickup and King Cab.

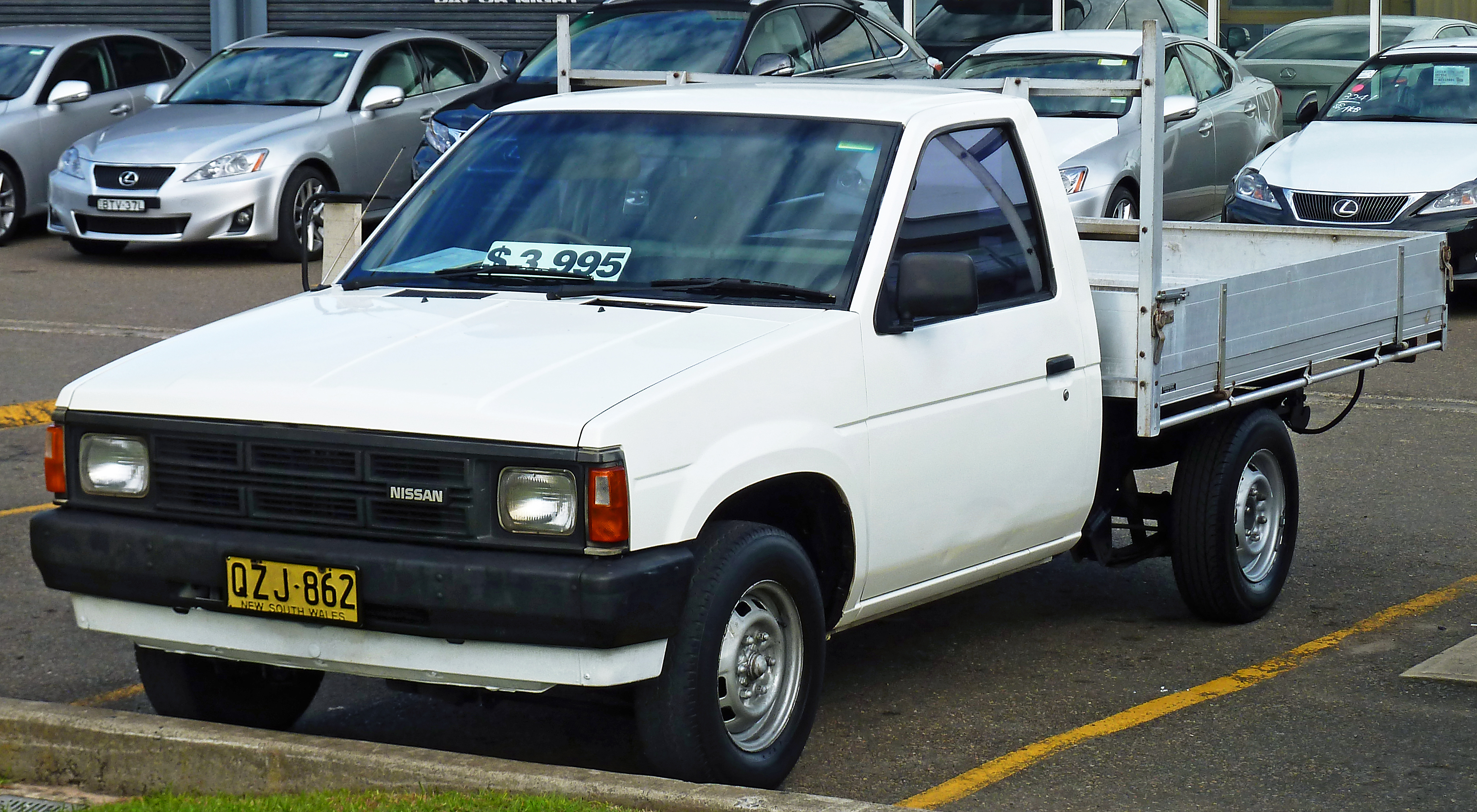
1989 Nissan Navara (D21) DX 2-door cab chassis (Australia)

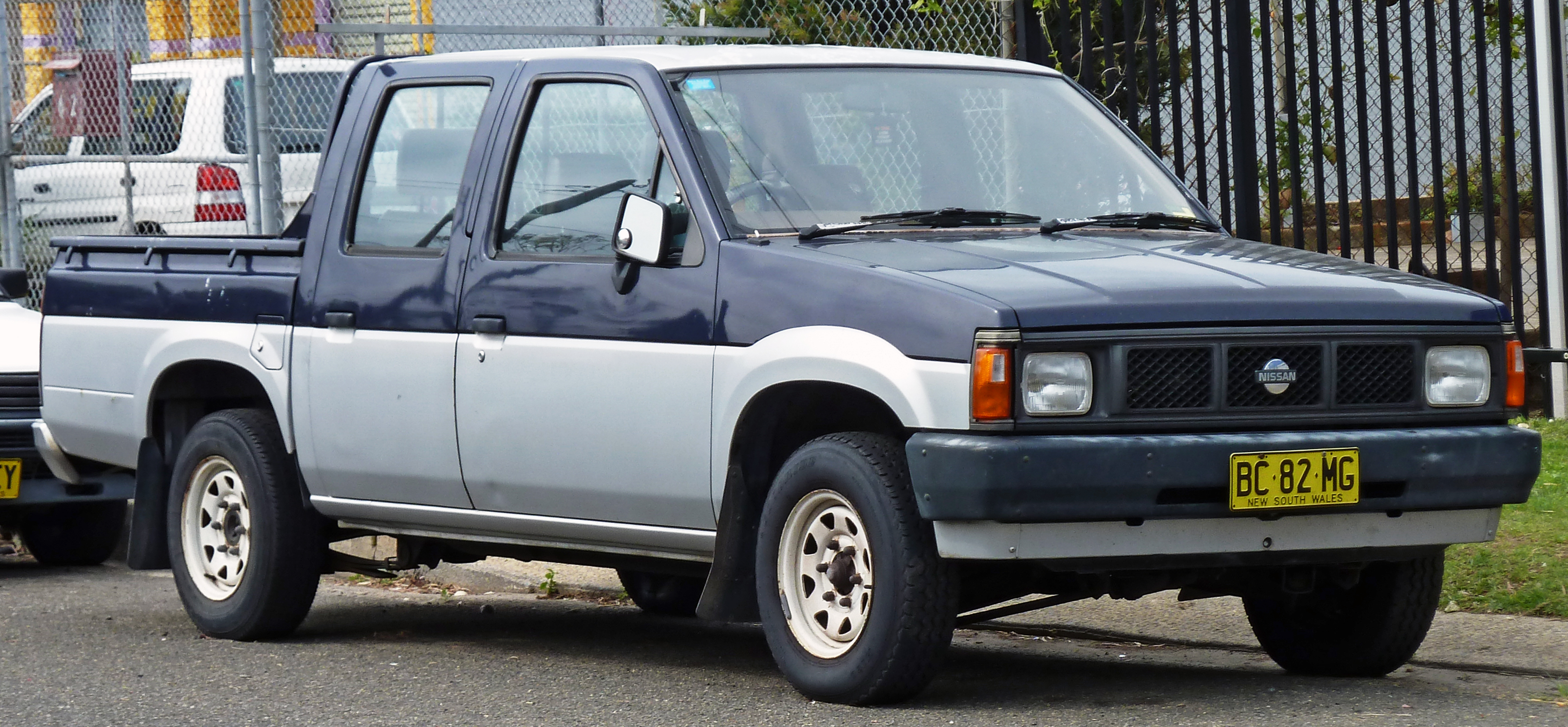

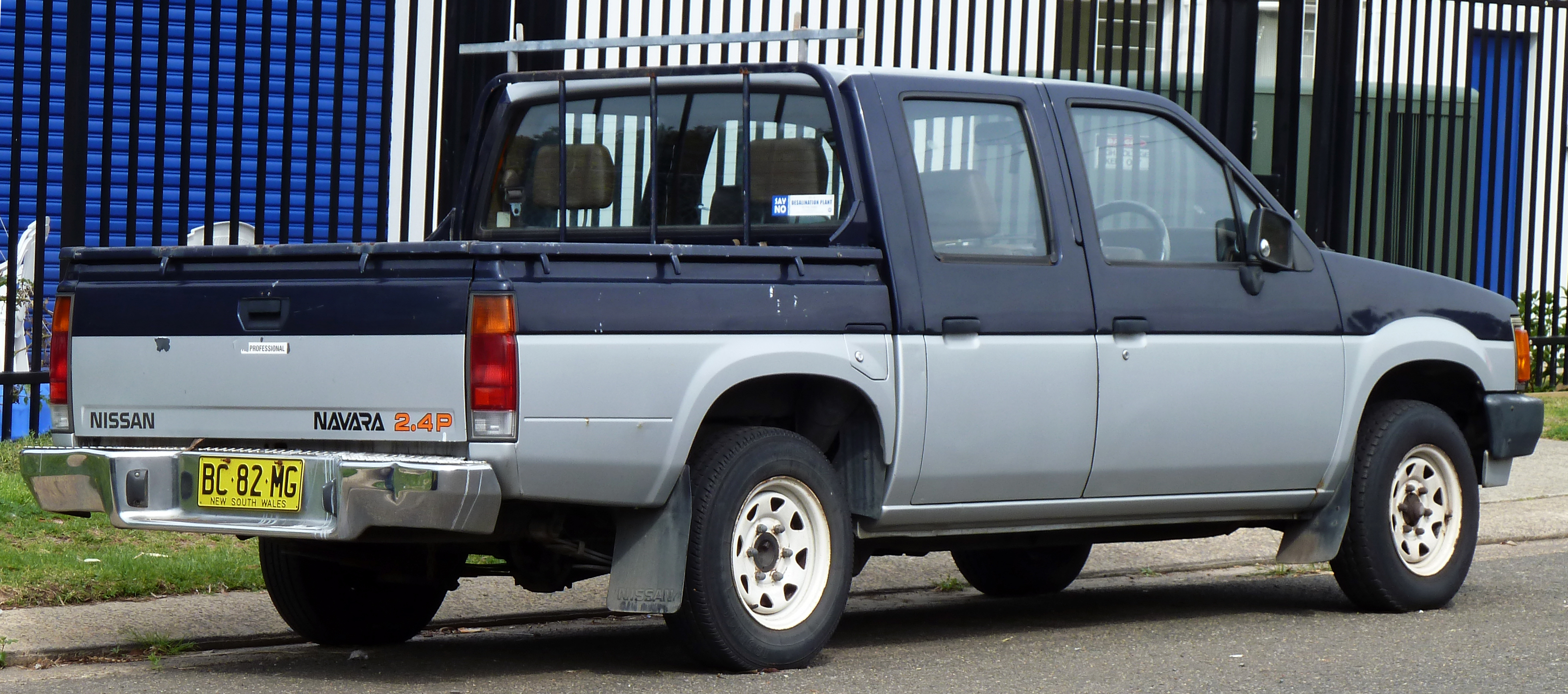
1989 Nissan Navara (D21) 4-door utility (Australia)

== First generation (D22; 1997) ==
First generation
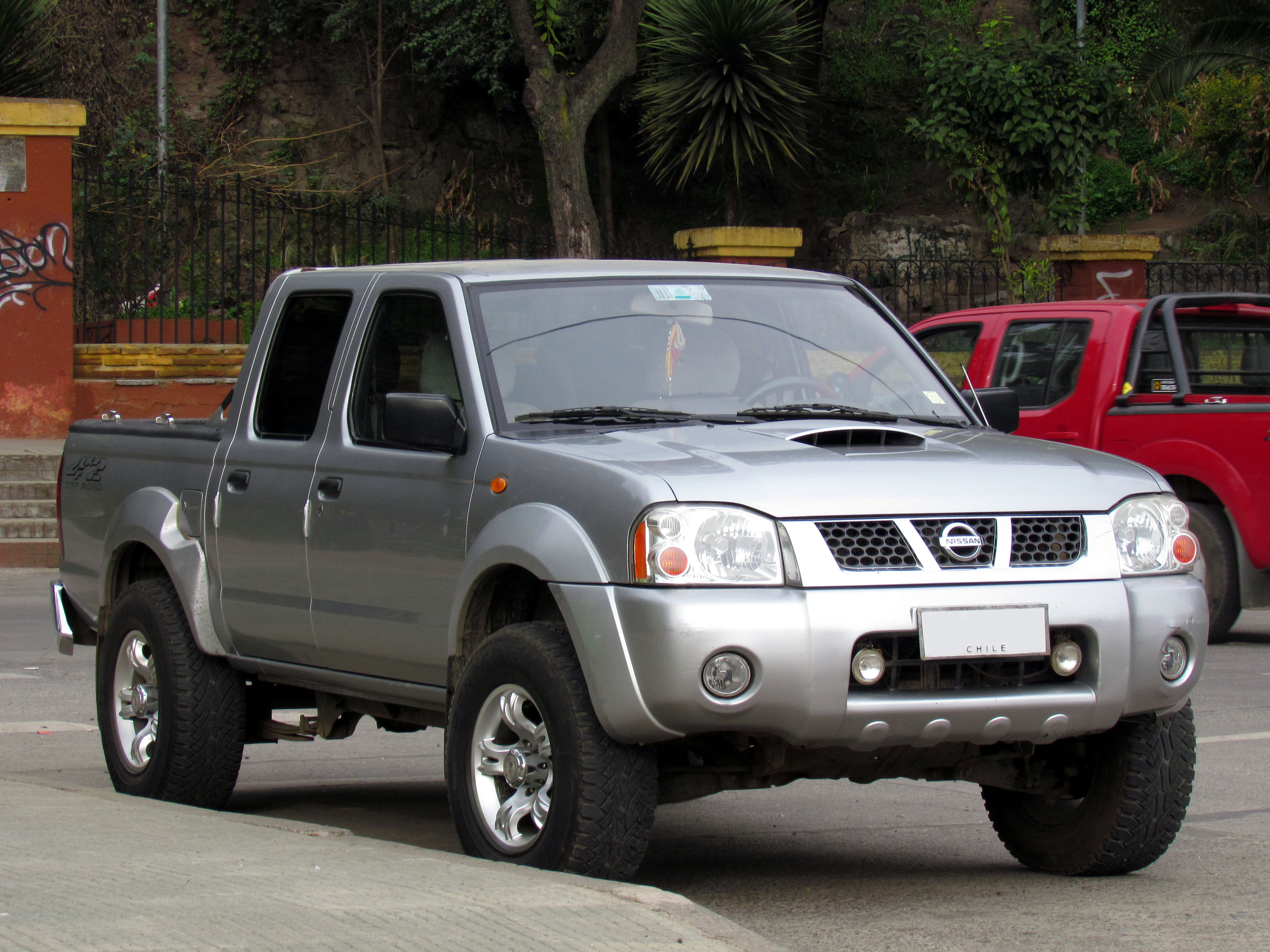
- 2006 Navara facelift Nissan D22 Terrano AX

Overview
- Model code: D22
- Also called: Nissan Datsun; Nissan Frontier; Nissan NP300; Nissan Fiera; Nissan Hardbody; Nissan PickUp; Nissan Terrano; Nissan Winner; Nissan Skystar; Pars Khodro-Nissan Seranza; Nissan Big M/Frontier; Thairung-Nissan Xciter; Dongfeng/ZNA Rich; Peugeot Pick-Up; Giad Pickup; Bhamo Pickup
- Production: Japan: April 1997–2004; United States: August 1997–2004; China: January 1999–December 2014; China: December 2014–present (Facelift version); South Africa: 1997–2022; Thailand: 1998–2007; Philippines: 1998–2014; Brazil: 2002–2007
- Assembly: Japan: Kanda, Fukuoka (Nissan Shatai); Brazil: São José dos Pinhais; China: Zhengzhou, Henan (Zhengzhou Nissan); Egypt: Cairo (Seoudi Group); Iran: Tehran (Pars Khodro); Malaysia: Kuala Lumpur (TCMA); Myanmar: Yangon (Bhamo Auto); Philippines: Makati (1998–October 2002); Santa Rosa City, Laguna (October 2002–November 2014); South Africa: Rosslyn; Spain: Barcelona (Nissan Motor Ibérica); Sudan: Al Jazirah state (Giad); Taiwan: Taipei; Mexico: Cuernavaca, Morelos (Nissan Mexico); Thailand: Samut Prakan (NMT); United States: Smyrna, Tennessee (Nissan USA)
- Designer: Nishino Sadaaki (1994); Jerry Hirschberg (1997: Crew Cab); Diane Allen (facelift: 1999)

Body and chassis
- Class: Compact pickup truck
- Related: Nissan Xterra; Nissan Pathfinder; Nissan Patrol; Nissan Paladin; Dongfeng Oting

Powertrain
- Engine: Petrol: 1998 cc NA20S I4; 1998 cc KA20DE I4; 2388 cc KA24E/KA24DE I4; 2960 cc VG30E V6; 3275 cc VG33E V6; 3275 cc VG33ER supercharged V6; Diesel: 2494 cc TD25 I4; 2488 cc YD25DDTi turbo-diesel I4; 2663 cc TD27 I4; 2799 cc MWM Sprint I4; 2953 cc ZD30DDT turbo-diesel I4; 3153 cc QD323 I4
- Transmission: 4-speed manual; 5-speed FS5R30A manual; 5-speed FS5W71C manual; 4-speed RL4R01A automatic; 4-speed RE4R01A automatic

Dimensions
- Wheelbase: regular cab: 104.3 in (2,649 mm); King Cab / crew cab short bed: 116.1 in (2,949 mm); crew cab long bed: 131.1 in (3,330 mm)
- Length: 1998–2002 King Cab: 196.1 in (4,981 mm); regular cab: 184.3 in (4,681 mm); 1998–2002 crew cab: 193.1 in (4,905 mm); 2003–04 King Cab: 202.9 in (5,154 mm); 2003–04 crew cab: 199.9 in (5,077 mm); 2003–04 crew cab long bed: 217.8 in (5,532 mm)
- Width: 2WD: 66.5 in (1,689 mm); 4WD & 2001–02 Desert Runner, crew cab 2WD & King Cab 2WD: 71.9 in (1,826 mm); 2003–04: 71.2 in (1,808 mm); 2003–04 King Cab 2WD: 67.7 in (1,720 mm)
- Height: 1998–2002 King Cab 2WD: 62.6 in (1,590 mm); King Cab 4WD & 2001–02 Desert Runner, crew cab 2WD & King Cab 2WD: 65.9 in (1,674 mm); 1998–2000 regular cab 2WD: 62.5 in (1,588 mm); 1998–2002 XE regular cab 2WD: 62.8 in (1,595 mm); 1998–2000 regular cab 4WD: 66.1 in (1,679 mm); 2003–04 King Cab 4WD & XE 2WD: 66.7 in (1,694 mm); 2003–04 crew cab 4WD: 67.1 in (1,704 mm); 2003–04 SVE & SC crew cab long bed 4WD: 71.8 in (1,824 mm); 2003–04 King Cab 2WD: 63.2 in (1,605 mm); SC 2WD: 69.9 in (1,775 mm)

Chronology
- Predecessor: D21 Series
- Successor: D40 Series

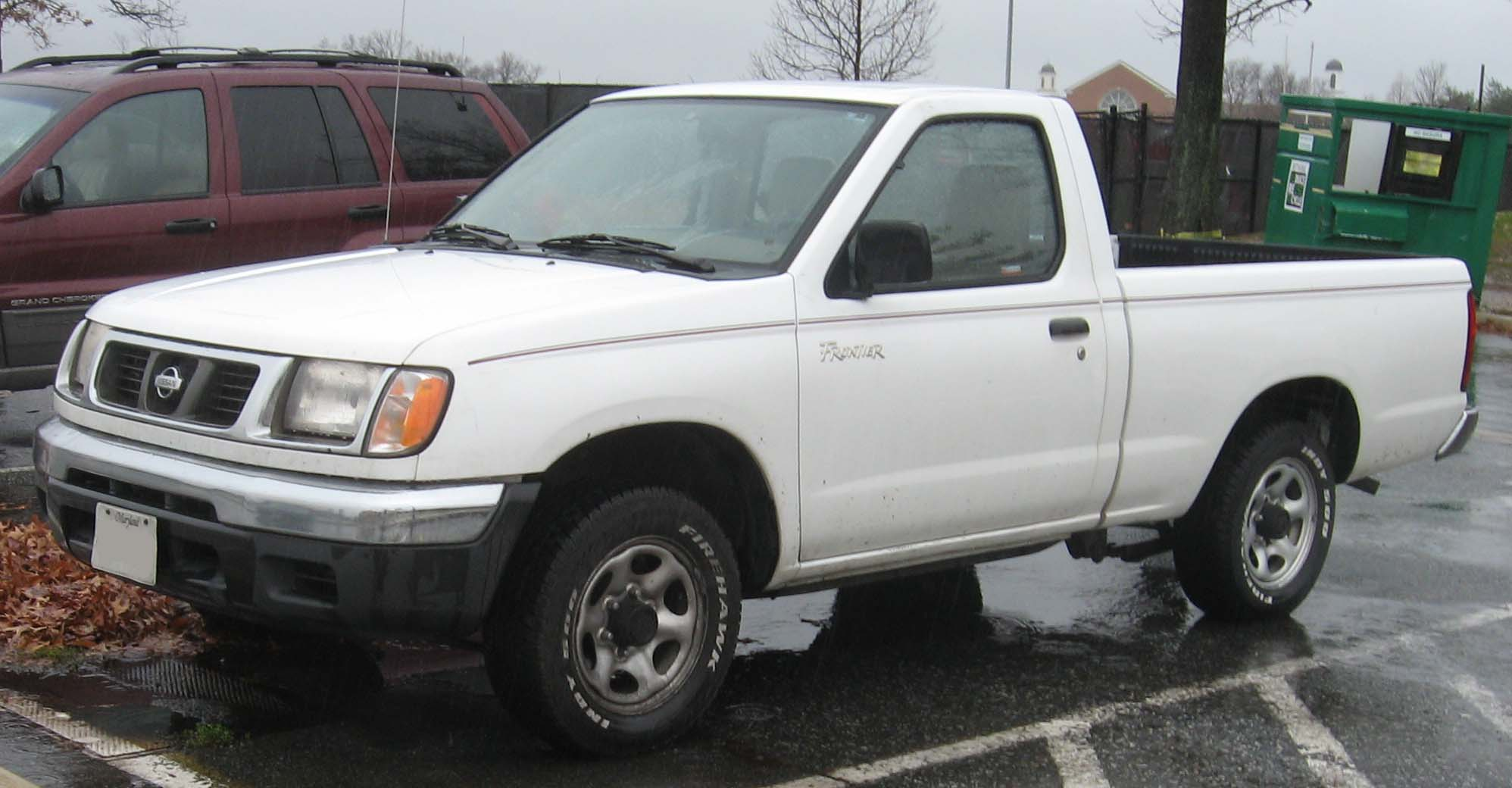
Single cab (pre-facelift)

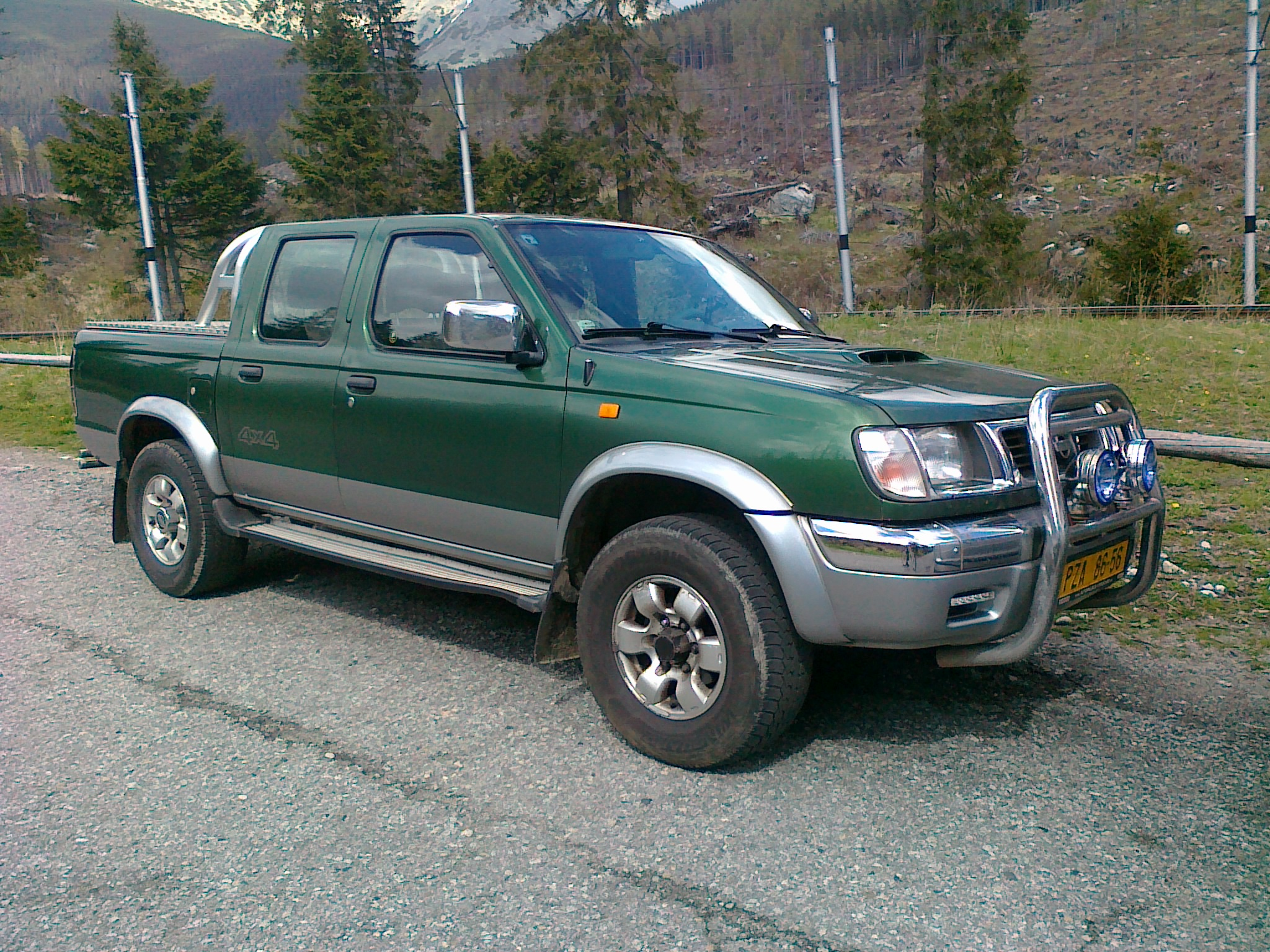
Crew cab (pre-facelift)

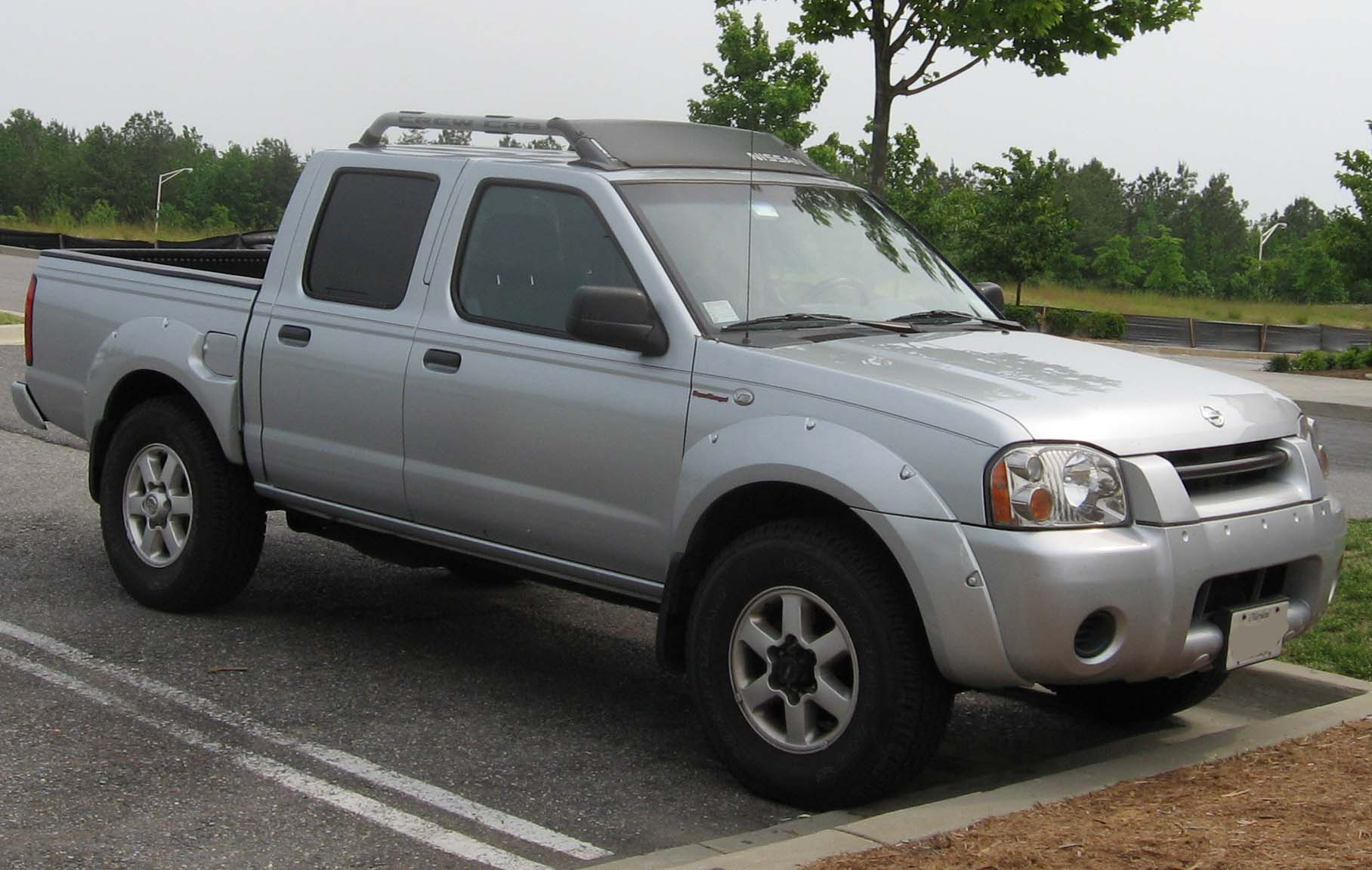
"Frontier" facelift crew cab

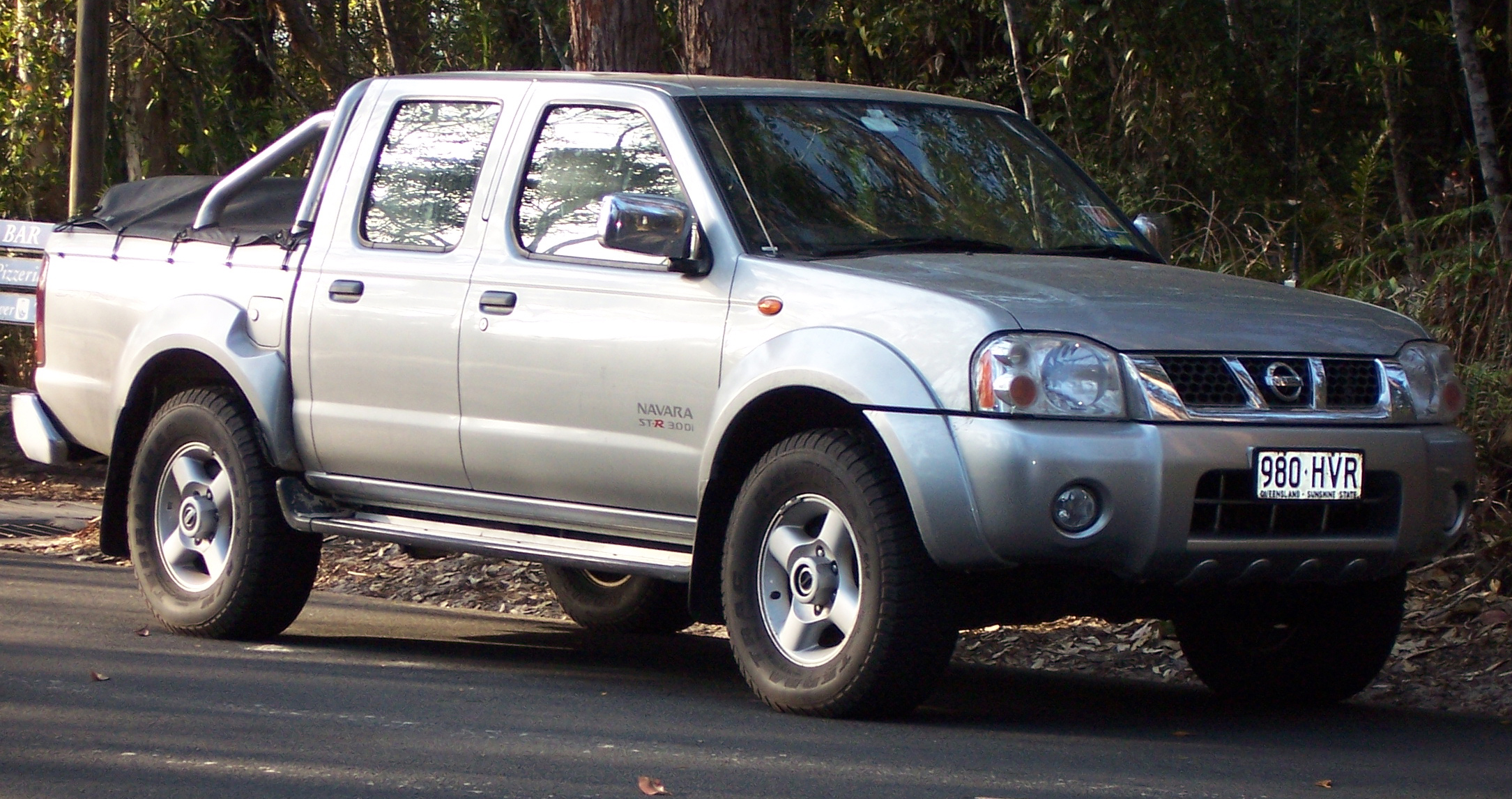
"Navara" facelift crew cab

The D22 is a compact pickup truck truck manufactured from 1997 to current, Nissan continue to build the D22 as a cheaper alternative to the D40 in many markets. Originally planned to follow the D21 Hard Body in being designed by Nissan Design International in La Jolla, CA, design of the D22 was reluctantly given to Japan during the 1994–1995 period. This was due to NDI being busy with many design projects for concepts and models, such as the Quest (VX54 II), Altima (L30), and Maxima (A32.5). Design of an updated D22 was eventually given to NDI in 1998.

=== North America ===
US production of the Frontier at the Smyrna, Tennessee plant began in 1997 with a 2-door regular cab and 2-door King Cab. A 4-door version of the D22 was designed and developed during 1997–1998, being first produced in April 1999 and launched in May 1999 in the US as the 2000 Frontier Crew Cab. Engines fitted were the petrol (KA24DE) and, for export only, the diesel TD27 (2wd and 4wd) with 5-speed manual transmission. These models were also exported to Central and South America.

A special Desert Runner model was offered in 1999 for the 2000 MY. It was a 2WD King Cab model built on the 4WD frame, which gave it a boost in ride height, larger tires, and a 4- or 5-speed transmission. For 2001 the Desert Runner got a new look and a supercharged version of the V6 engine.

=== Facelift ===
In February 2000 at the Chicago Auto Show, Nissan introduced a facelifted D22 Frontier for 2001, with bolder styling in an effort to make it more appealing to younger buyers in its second generation. The regular cab would be discontinued after the 2001 MY. Sales and production started in North America, with Crew Cab and King Cab versions and new grille, bumper, headlights, taillights. Other body changes included built in fender flares and tailgates.

The D22s badged as "Frontier" had different grille, tailgate details and interior in contrast to the D22s badged as "Navara".

The D22 was no longer sold in Japan after 2002. Due to incompatible taxation rules and plummeting popularity of pickup trucks in Japan, Nissan discontinued it in their home market with no replacement afterwards, a fate shared by many of its competitors there.

The Egyptian plant exports to the Middle East, and a South African plant to African countries. Mexican production started in 2008: D22 truck Single Cab Chassis and Long Bed (2WD or 4WD, 2.4-litre petrol or diesel), Crew Cab (2WD and petrol) called the D22 Pickup.

In 2009, the D22 was updated with redesigned exterior door handles.

In June 2017, Peugeot announced to produce the Peugeot Pick-Up for Northern African states. It is equipped with a 2.5-litre inline-four turbo-diesel, producing 115 PS (85 kW) and 280 N⋅m (207 lb⋅ft), 5-speed manual transmission, rear wheel drive or all-wheel drive, with optional gear reduction. It is a badge engineered version of the Dongfeng Rich, which has a partnership with PSA. It comes as a Crew Cab (5 passengers) short bed (1.40 m x 1.39 m cargo area) version (5.08 m in length) with a payload of 815 kg. Market introduction started in September 2017.

==== Australia ====
For the Australian market, the D22 Navara ran as a series 1 from the end of the D21 until 2001, when a series 2 was released with a new ZD30 Diesel engine and updated front end. The ZD30 powered D22's were fairly reliable unlike the Patrol counterparts, but were replaced in 2007 with an upgraded Common Rail 2.5L Diesel engine. The D22 Navara was run in parallel with the larger D40 until 2015. Both were replaced by the D23 Navara - locally known as the NP300 Navara as of 2015.

==== Bolivia ====
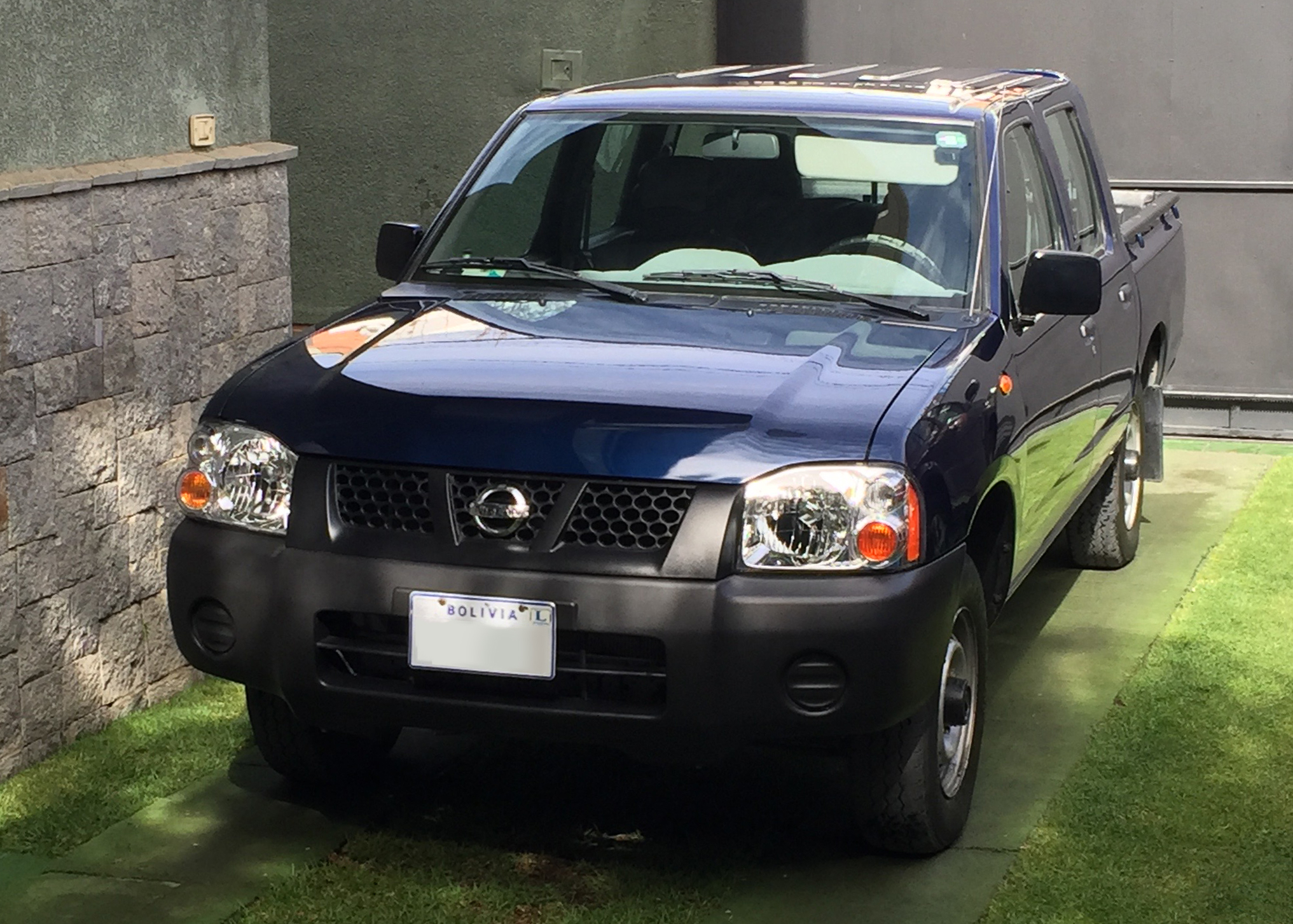
A facelift Nissan D22 Frontier Crew Cab

Nissan Bolivia imported from Japan the Nissan Frontier D22 Crew Cab, 2.4-litre petrol or diesel, 4WD. Imported from Mexico, the D22 Crew Cab and single cab long bed, petrol 2WD. Some Frontiers were gray imported from the US. These were V6 with automatic transmission for private importers.

==== Brazil ====
The Brazilian Nissan plant started production around 2002 (Crew Cab Diesel 2WD or 4WD, five-speed manual, or single cab 2WD diesel. Only for Mexican market: petrol 2.4-litre manufactured in Mexico) and it was exported to Argentina (all Brazilian versions) and Mexico (Crew Cab, petrol 2.4-litre, 2WD, five-speed manual).

==== Chile ====
In Chile, the D22 was marketed as the "Nissan Terrano" (a name previously used in the WD21 SUV) due to Kia already using the "Frontier" moniker in its Bongo minivan series. It was sold from 1998 to 2014 and according to the National Automobile Association of Chile it was the most sold automobile in 2010. The facelifted "Navara" version arrived in 2003, in 2.4L petrol, 2.5L turbo diesel, 3.0L turbo diesel and 3.2L diesel. Even with the unveiling of the D40 Navara in 2008, it continued to be sold as a cheaper and more work-oriented alternative, outselling the D40. Starting in 2012, all D22 models were imported from Mexico replacing the Japanese model's injection pump with a common rail fuel-injection system, among other changes and the 3.0L and 3.2L models were discontinued. The D22 was replaced by the Nissan D23 "NP300" in 2015.

=== Engines ===
Nissan first offered the D22 with a four-cylinder engine, the KA24DE, but added the V6 engine, the VG33E in 1999. In Australia the D22 had the KA24E till 1999, then changed to KA24DE option that year. A 3.0-litre V6 was introduced in June 2000. A supercharged version of the 3.3-litre V6 became available with introduction of the facelifted 2001 models. In February 2003, 4x4 models received a larger 3.3-litre V6 (available only with a 5-speed manual), while 4x2 models continued with the 3.0 (with manual or automatic transmissions). The V6 was dropped in 2005, leaving the 2.5-litre turbo-diesel as the only available engine.

The first series of D22s had larger (QD32) 3.2-litre normally aspirated diesel engines producing 75 kW. It also had a (NA20S) 2.0-litre petrol SOHC 8 valve engine producing 75 kW.

| Engine | Displacement | Power | Torque | Notes |
|---|---|---|---|---|
| SOHC 4-Cylinder (NA20S) | 2.0 L (121 CID) | 74 kW (100 PS; 99 bhp) | 123 lb⋅ft (167 N⋅m) | |
| SOHC 4-Cylinder (KA24E) | 2.4 L (146 CID) | 100 kW (136 PS; 134 bhp) | 152–154 lb⋅ft (206–209 N⋅m) | 1997–1999 (Australia) |
| DOHC 4-Cylinder (KA24DE) | 2.4 L (146 CID) | 107 kW (145 PS; 143 bhp) | 154 lb⋅ft (209 N⋅m) | |
| DOHC 4-Cylinder (YD25DDTi) | 2.5 L (153 CID) | 77 kW (105 PS; 104 bhp) | 245 N⋅m (25 kg⋅m; 181 lb⋅ft) | Turbo diesel intercooler |
| DOHC 4-Cylinder (YD25DDTi) | 2.5 L (153 CID) | 98 kW (133 PS; 131 bhp) | 304 N⋅m (31 kg⋅m; 224 lb⋅ft) | Turbo diesel intercooler |
| DOHC 4-Cylinder (ZD30DDT) | 3.0 L (183 CID) | 110 kW (150 PS; 148 bhp) | 314 N⋅m (232 lb⋅ft) | Turbo diesel (non-intercooler) |
| DOHC 4-Cylinder (QD323) | 3.2 L (195 CID) | 75 kW (102 PS; 101 bhp) | 163 lb⋅ft (221 N⋅m) | Diesel |
| SOHC V6 (VG33E) | 3.3 L (201 CID) | 127 kW (172 PS; 170 bhp) | 200 lb⋅ft (271 N⋅m) | 134 kW (182 PS; 180 bhp) and 202 lb⋅ft (274 N⋅m) for MY2003-2004 |
| SOHC supercharged V6 (VG33ER) | 3.3 L (201 CID) | 157 kW (213 PS; 210 bhp) | 246 lb⋅ft (334 N⋅m) | 231 lb⋅ft (313 N⋅m) for Automatic |

=== Safety ===
The African version of the NP300 received 0 stars for adult occupants and 2 stars for infants from Global NCAP 1.0 in 2018 (similar to Latin NCAP 2013).

=== Gallery ===
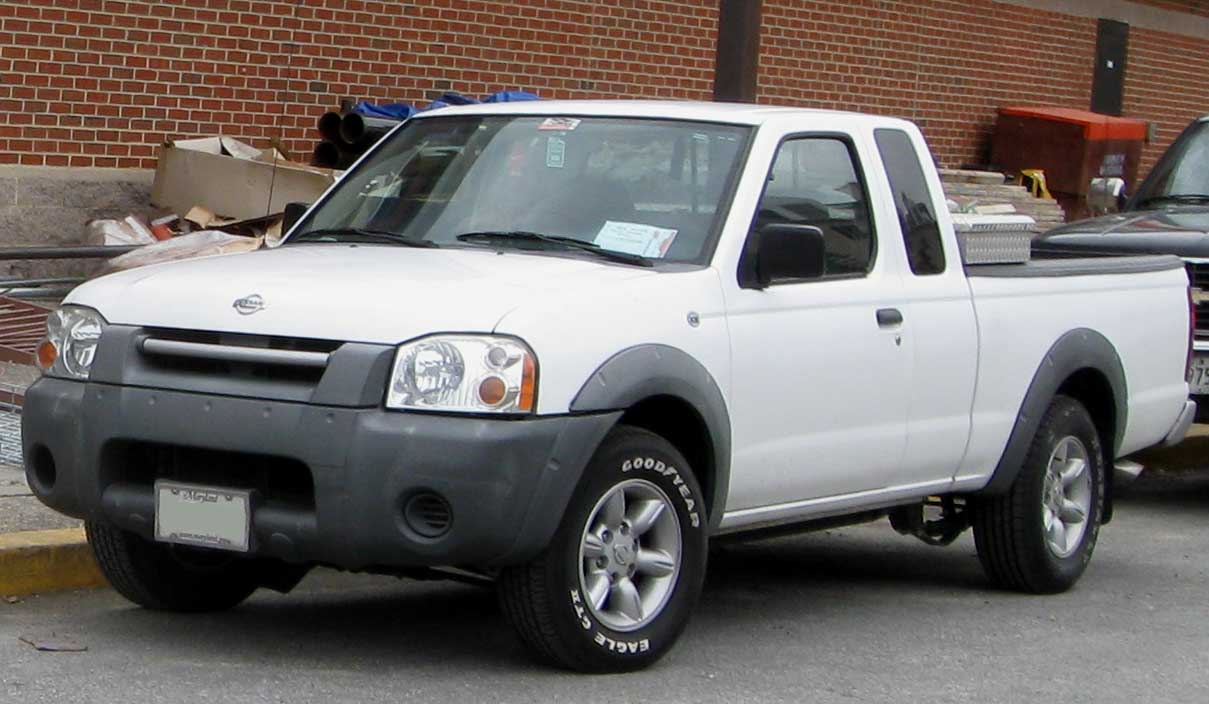
2001–2004 Facelift Nissan D22 Frontier extended/king cab

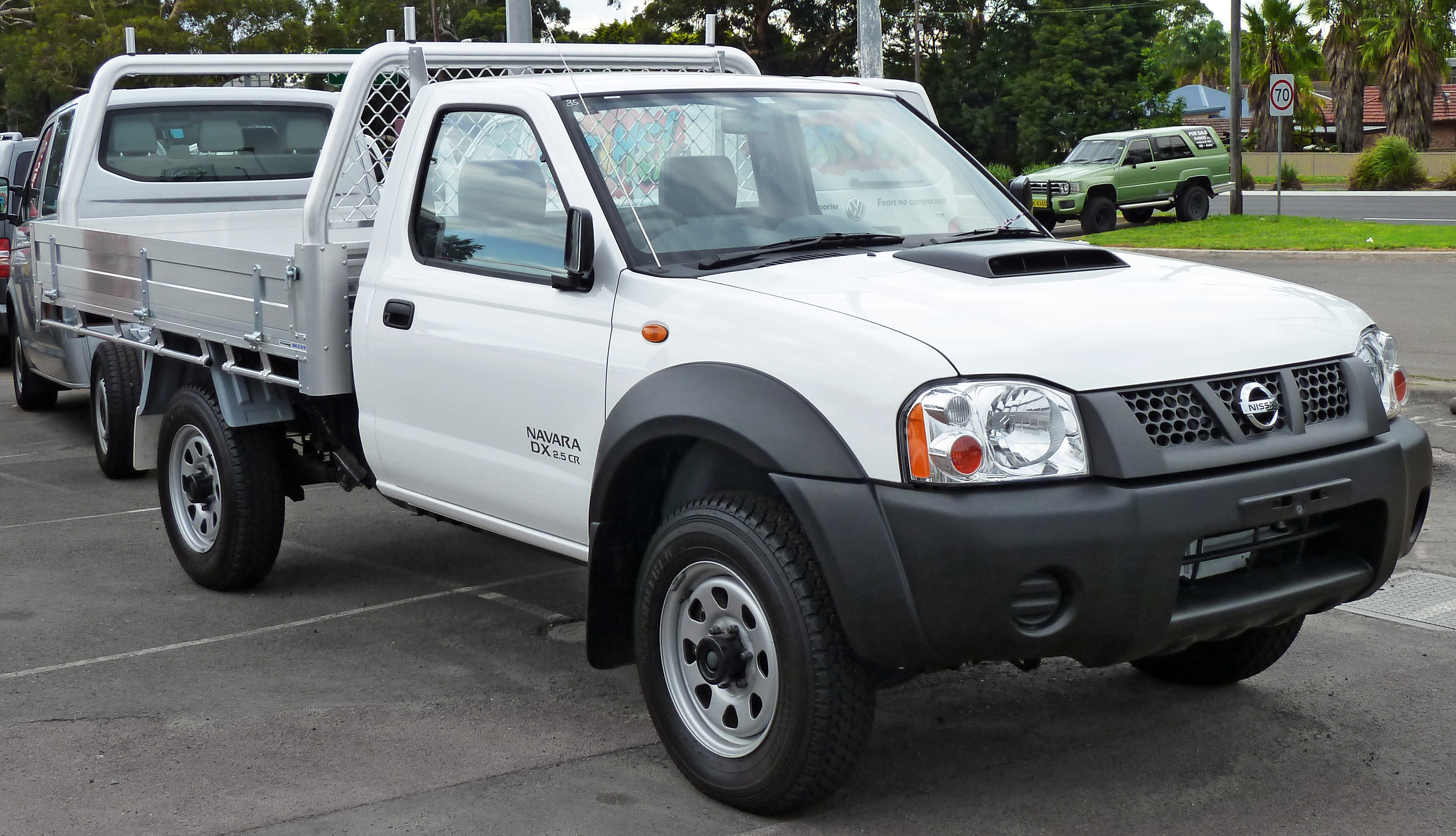
2010–2011 Facelift Nissan D22 Navara DX regular cab (Australia). Note: updated exterior door handles from 2009 onwards.

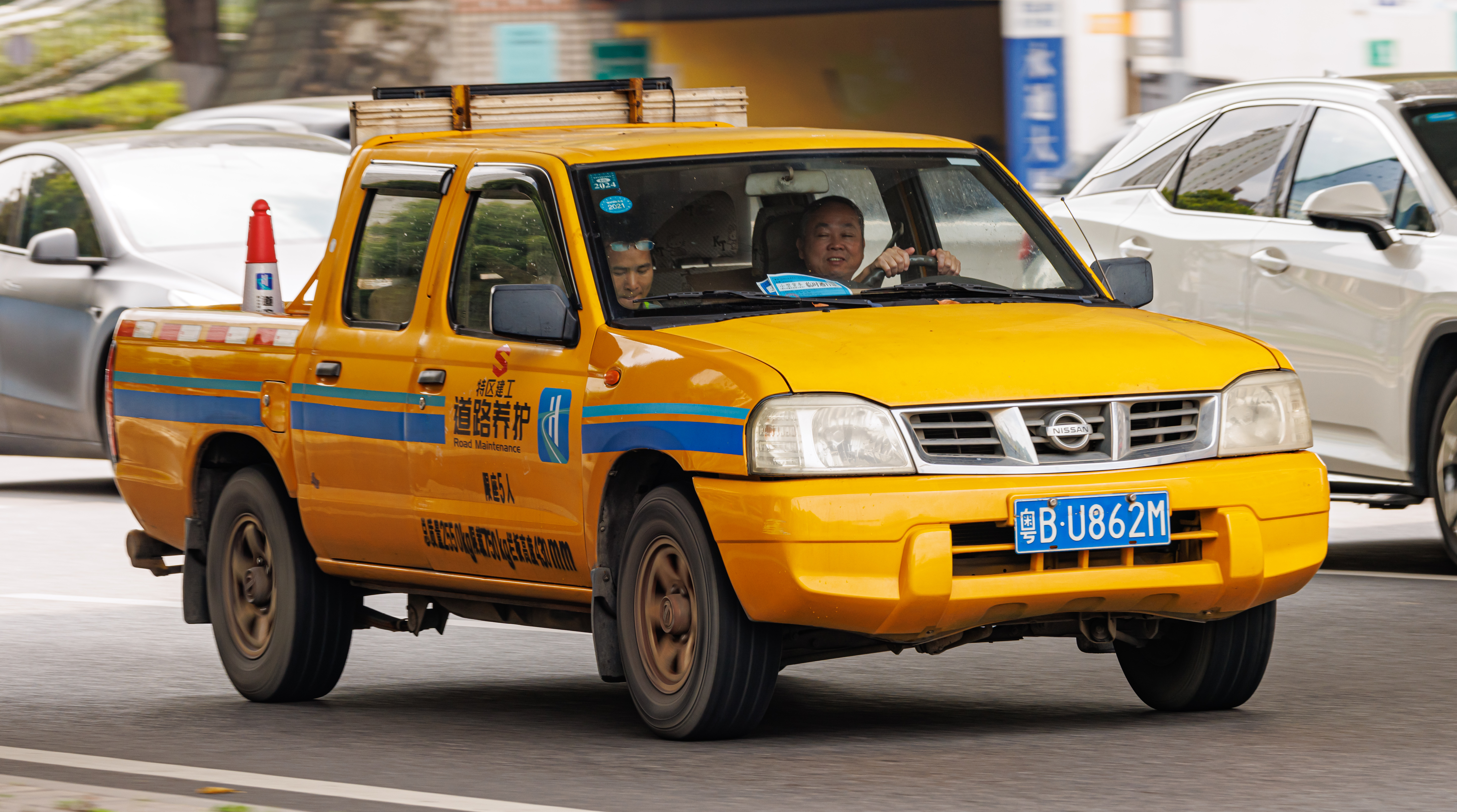
2007 Zhengzhou Nissan D22 Pickup Facelift in China

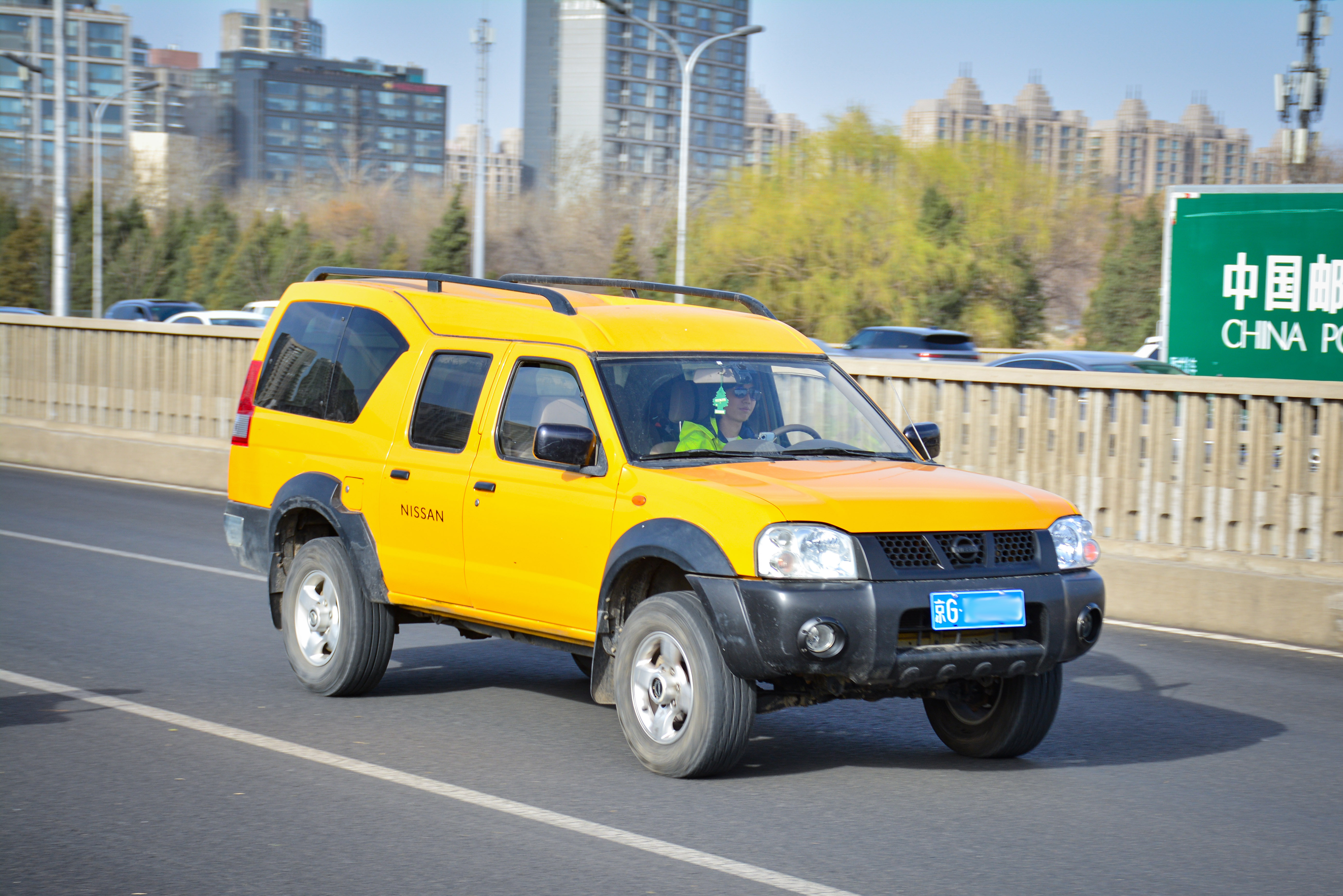
2016 Zhengzhou Nissan D22 NP300 utility type in China, with enclosed body from factory

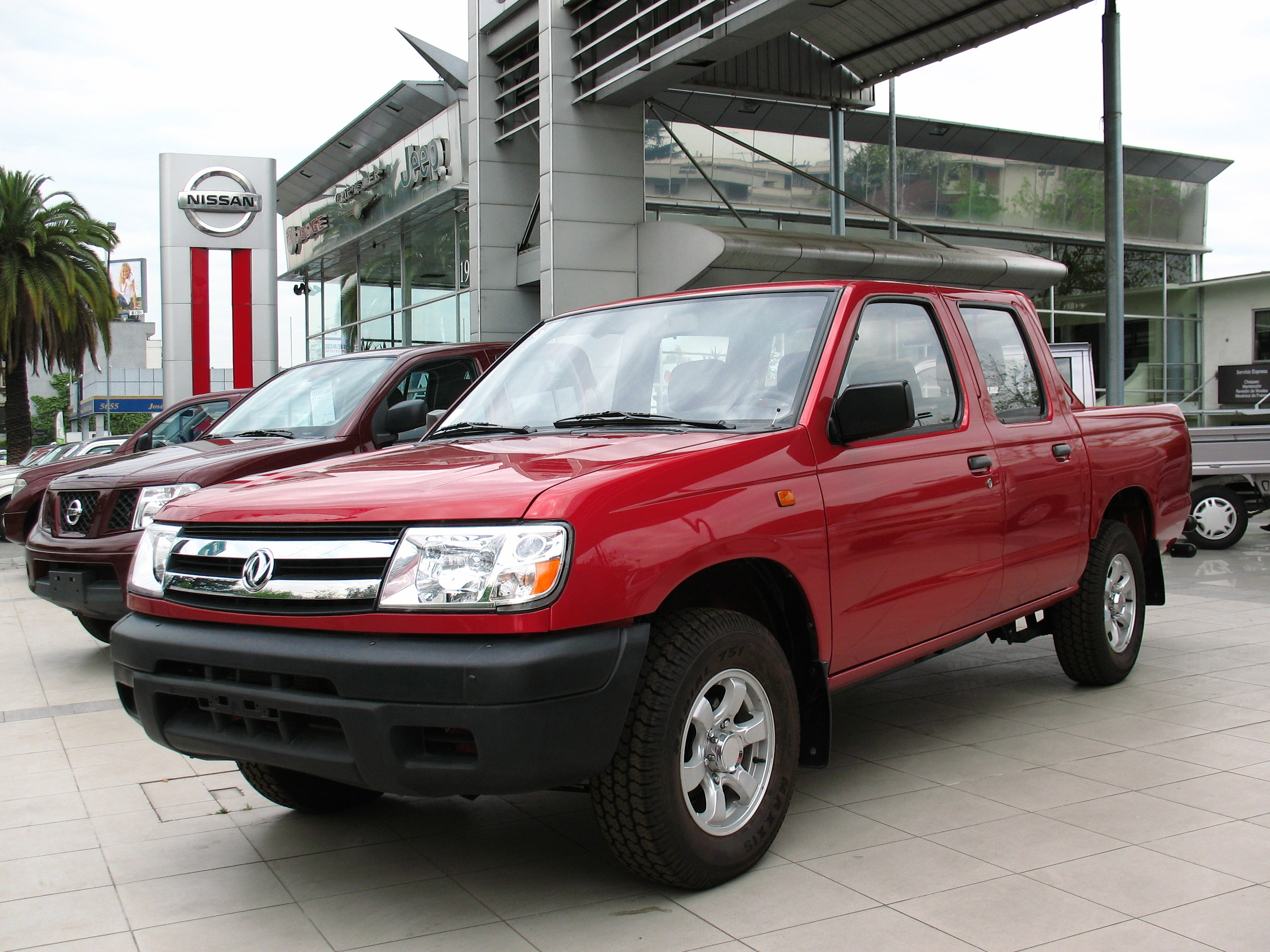
2010 Dongfeng/ZNA Rich pre-facelift, based on the pre-facelift D22 Navara

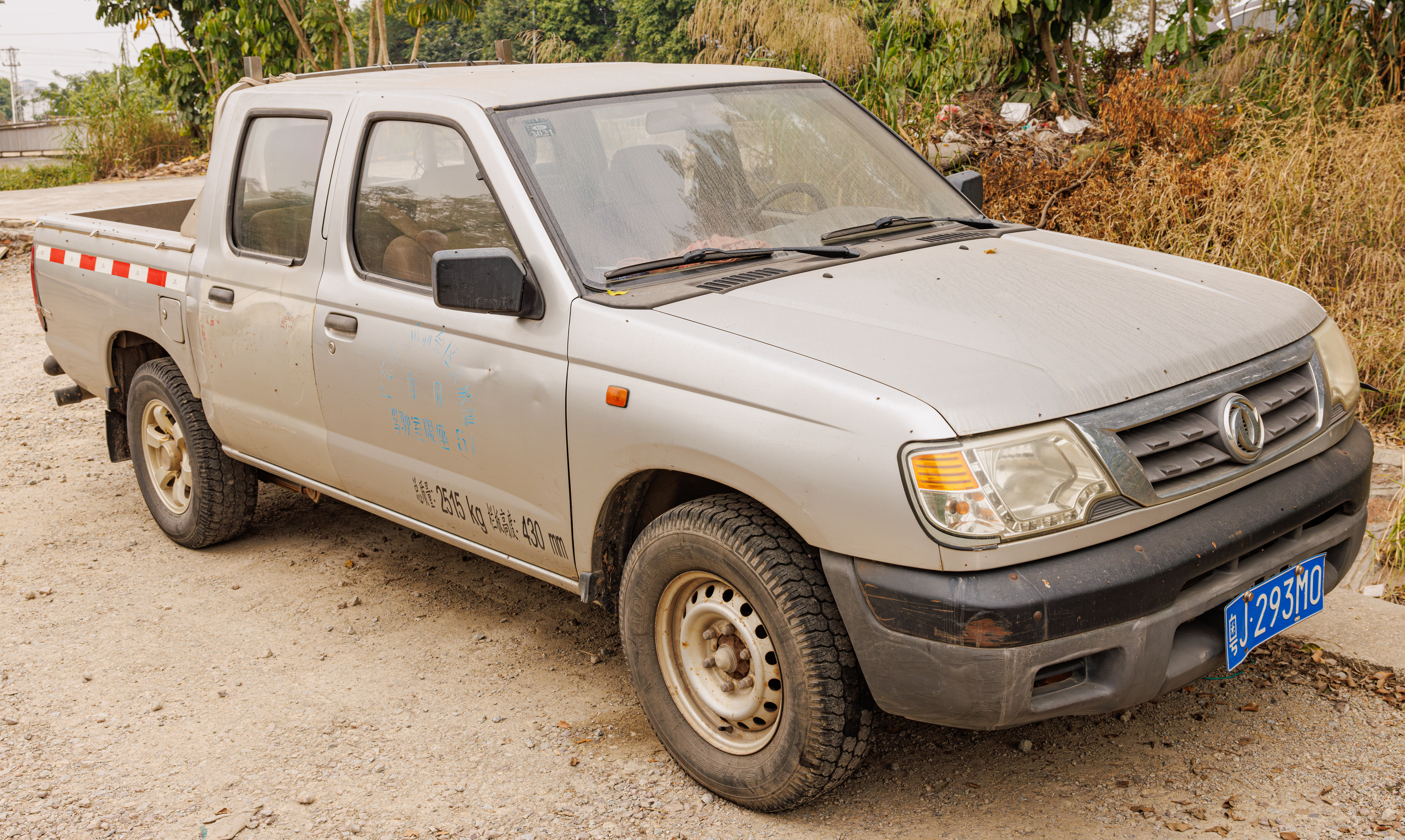
2013 Dongfeng/ZNA Rich facelift, based on the pre-facelift D22 Navara

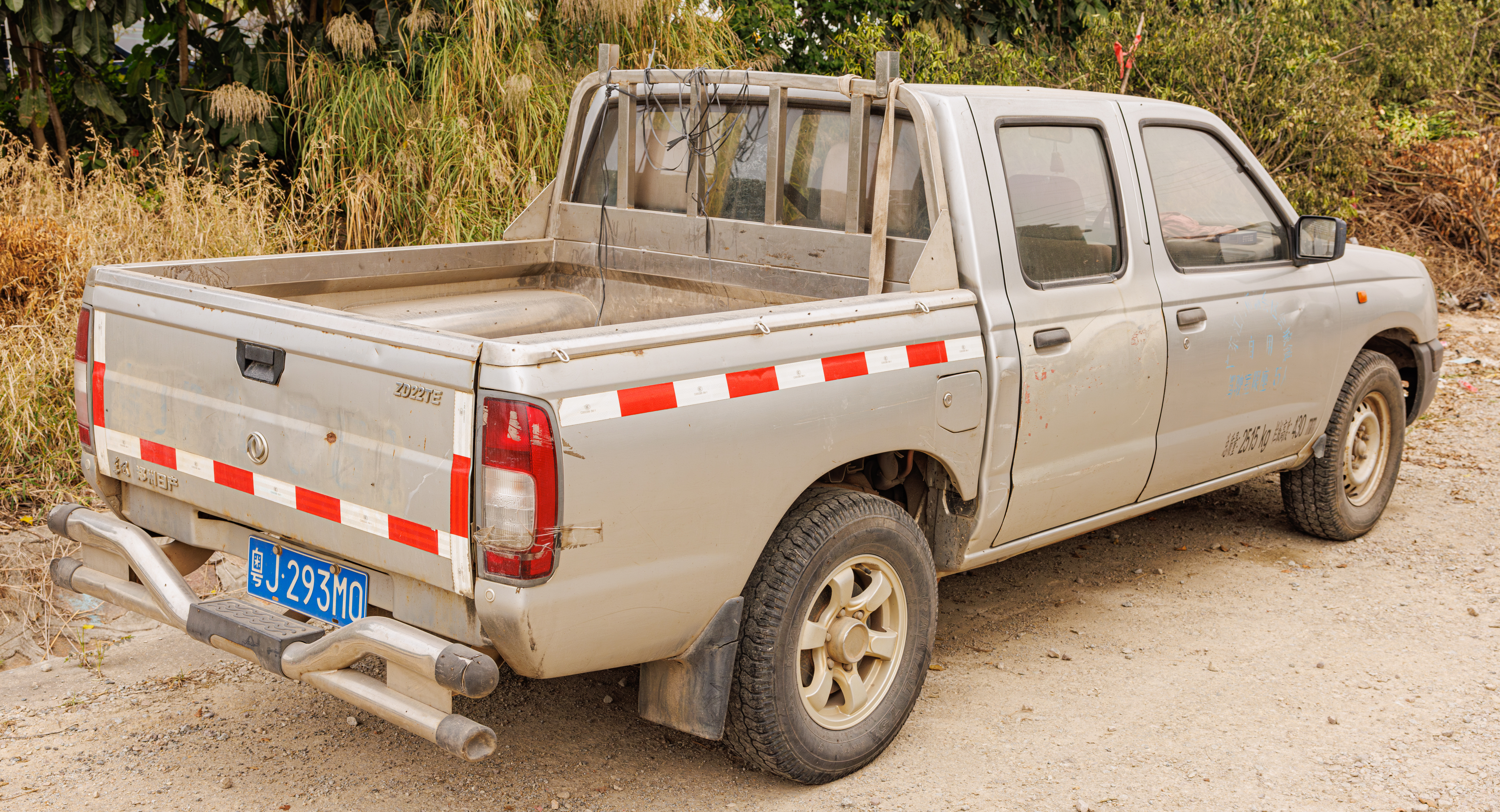
2013 Dongfeng/ZNA Rich facelift rear view, based on the pre-facelift D22 Navara

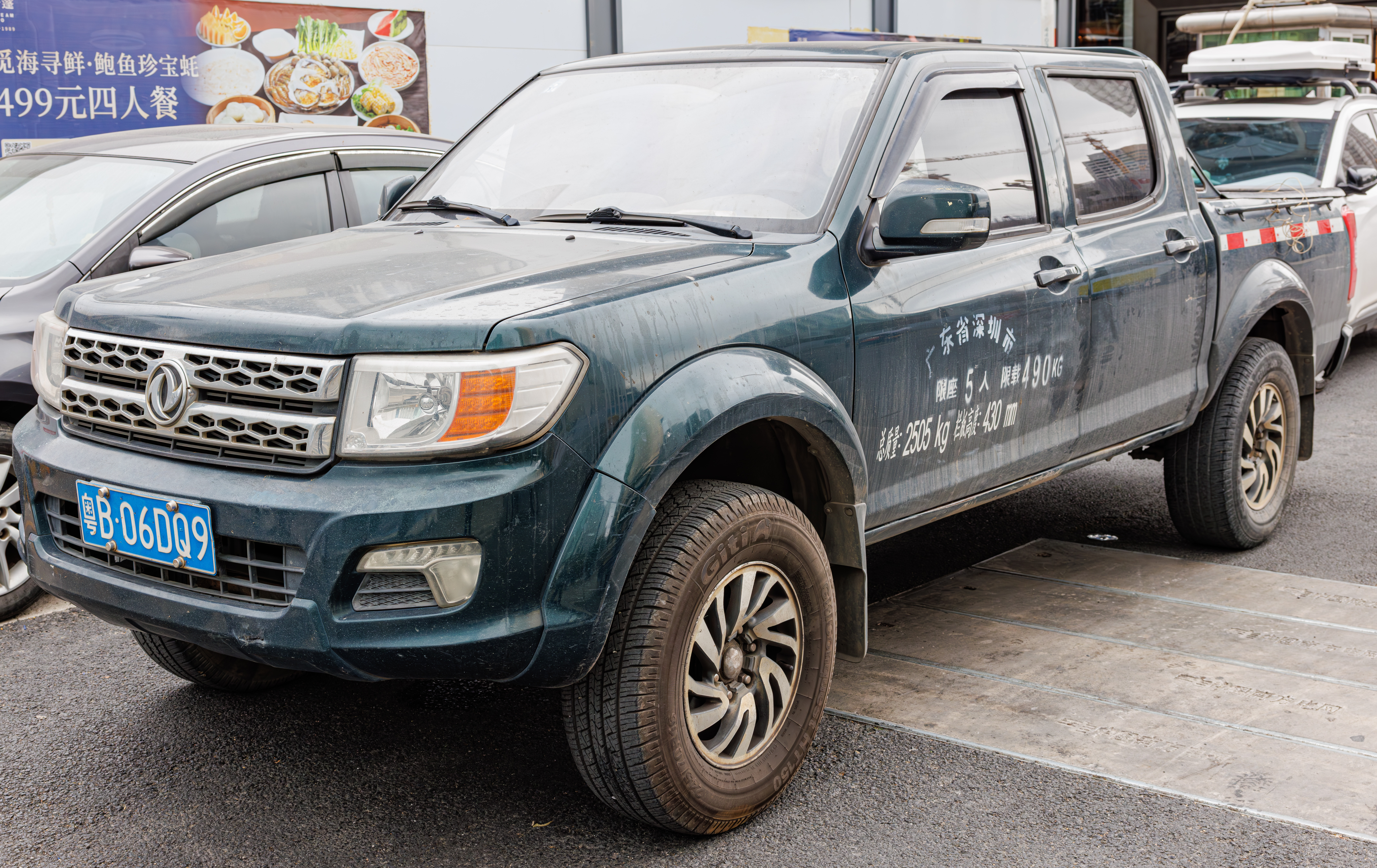
2017 Dongfeng/ZNA Rich, based on the D22 Navara

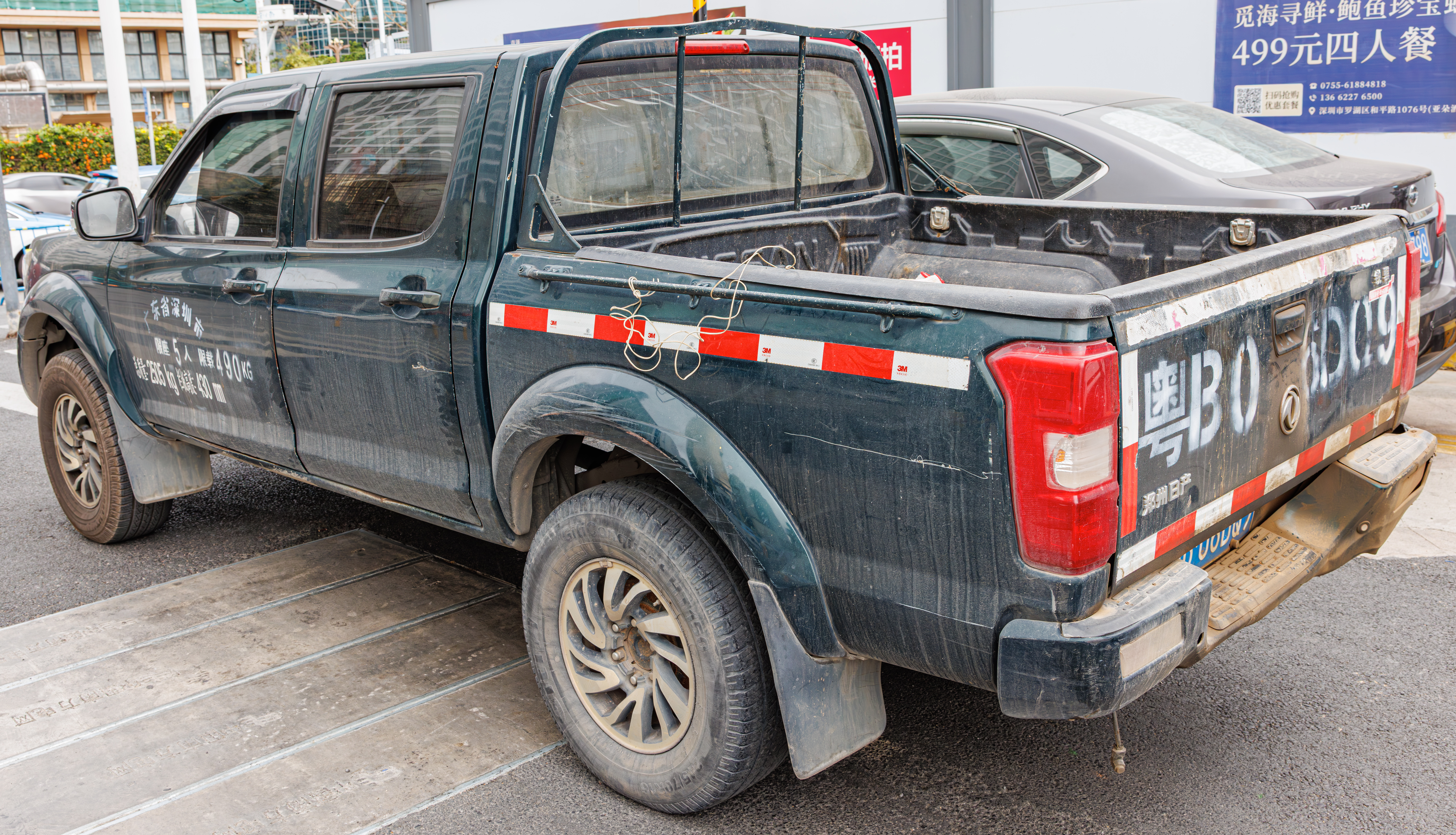
2017 Dongfeng/ZNA Rich rear view, based on the D22 Navara

=== International names ===
- Big M Frontier (Thailand, 1998–2001)
- Datsun (Japan)
- Didsun or Datsun (Persian Gulf countries)
- Fiera (Bolivia)
- Frontier (USA, Canada, Philippines, Argentina, Paraguay, Uruguay, Mexico, Bolivia, Brazil and Thailand, 2001–2007)
- Navara (Europe and Australasia)
- NP300 (Mexico, some European markets; in Mexico "Frontier" is a luxury trim of the NP300)
- NP300 Hardbody (South Africa)
- Pick Up (Europe, Central and South America, Africa, Asia)
- Terrano (Chile)
- Skystar (Turkey, facelift Navara)
- Winner (Middle East) (Crew Cab only)
- Bravado (Philippines)

==== Rebadged versions ====
- Dongfeng/ZNA Rich (D22 pre-facelift)
- Bhamo Pickup (Myanmar)
- Giad Pickup (Sudan)
- Peugeot Pick-Up (Africa)

== Second generation (D40; 2004) ==
Second generation
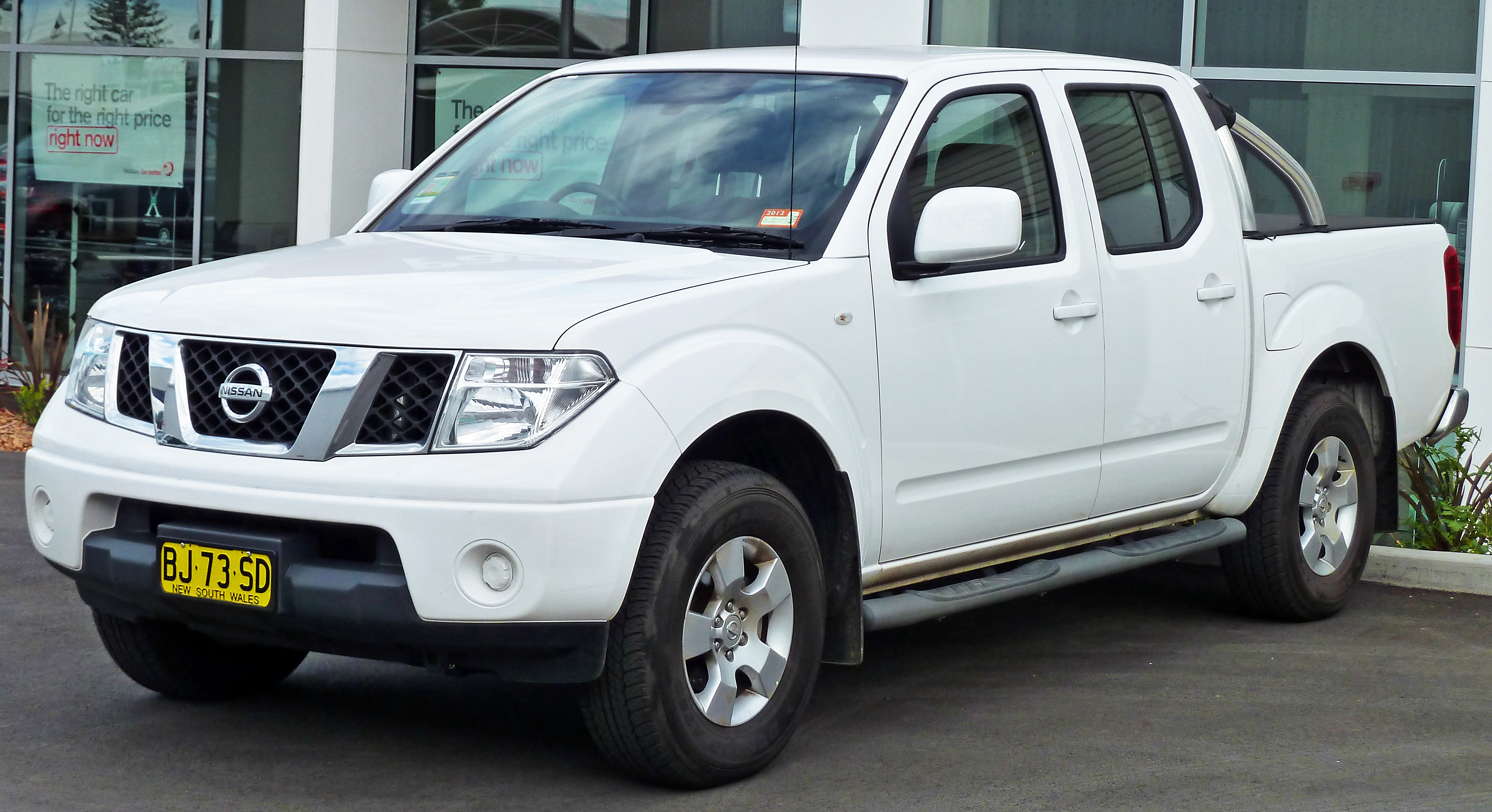
- Nissan Navara (D40); facelift

Overview
- Model code: D40
- Also called: Nissan Frontier; Nissan Frontier Navara; Suzuki Equator; ACMAT ALTV
- Production: October 2004 – June 2021 (United States); 2007–2014 (Thailand); 2008–2017 (Brazil)
- Model years: 2005–2021 (North America)
- Assembly: United States: Smyrna, Tennessee; Canton, Mississippi (Nissan USA); Mexico: Cuernavaca, Morelos (Nissan Mexico); Brazil: São José dos Pinhais; Spain: Barcelona (Nissan Motor Ibérica); Thailand: Samut Prakan (NMT); Laem Chabang (Mitsubishi Motors Thailand: 2012–2014); Malaysia: Kuala Lumpur (TCMA)
- Designer: Kiyoshi Yanase

Body and chassis
- Class: Mid-size pickup truck
- Platform: Nissan F-Alpha platform
- Related: Nissan Xterra; Nissan Pathfinder; Nissan Titan; Nissan Armada; Infiniti QX56

Powertrain
- Engine: Petrol: 2.5 L QR25DE I4; 3.8 L VQ38DD V6; 4.0 L VQ40DE V6; Petrol/CNG: 2.5 L QR25DE I4 (Navara CNG); Diesel: 2.5 L YD25DDTi I4; 3.0 L V9X V6
- Transmission: 5-speed manual; 6-speed manual; 5-speed RE5R05A automatic; 7-speed RE7R01B automatic (V9X only); 9-speed 9G-Tronic automatic (VQ38DD only)

Dimensions
- Wheelbase: 125.9 in (3,198 mm) (2 door with 6 foot bed, 4 door with 5 foot bed) 139.9 in (3,553 mm) (4 door with 6 foot bed)
- Length: 219.4 in (5,573 mm) (4 door with 6 foot bed); 205.5 in (5,220 mm) (2 door with 6 foot bed, 4 door with 5 foot bed)
- Width: 72.8 in (1,849 mm)
- Height: 68.7–73.9 in (1,745–1,877 mm)

Chronology
- Successor: Nissan Frontier (D41) (North America)

The D40 model was introduced at the 2004 North American International Auto Show. It uses the new Nissan F-Alpha platform and exterior body styling resembles that of the full-size Nissan Titan.

The new truck has a fully boxed ladder frame. The wheelbase is 125.9 in (3.20 m) with a 205.5 in (5.22 m) overall length. (wheelbase and length for 4 door with 6 foot bed 139.9 in. /219.4 in.) Towing capacity is 6,500 lb (2,950 kg). A 4.0-litre VQ-family V6, the VQ40DE, is the standard engine in North America, and it produces 261 hp (195 kW) and 281 lb⋅ft (381 N⋅m) of torque. Also available is the QR25DE four-cylinder engine, which is also found in the Nissan Altima. It produces 152 hp (113 kW) and 171 lb⋅ft (232 N⋅m) of torque. A six-speed manual is standard with a five-speed automatic optional. Both rear and four-wheel drive are available. Traction control and hill-descent control are also available.

The Frontier is called Navara when sold in Europe. The engine is a 2.5-litre YD25DDTi diesel, with 142 hp (106 kW) or 172 hp (128 kW). The stronger version has 403 N⋅m (297 lb⋅ft) of torque.

Suzuki sold a Frontier-based mid-sized pickup produced by Nissan North America at the Smyrna plant. The truck debuted at the 2008 Chicago Auto Show as the Suzuki Equator. For 2009, the Frontier received a facelift with more options, colours, and new wheels. The Nismo model was replaced by the PRO-4X model. Suzuki discontinued the Equator in 2013, as part of the shutdown of their American passenger car division.

In 2012, production in the United States was shifted from Smyrna, Tennessee to Canton, Mississippi.

Sales of the PRO-4X model continue in Mexico.

In 2014, Nissan released a concept truck with a 2.8-litre straight-four engine Cummins Diesel engine paired with a ZF 8HP transmission.

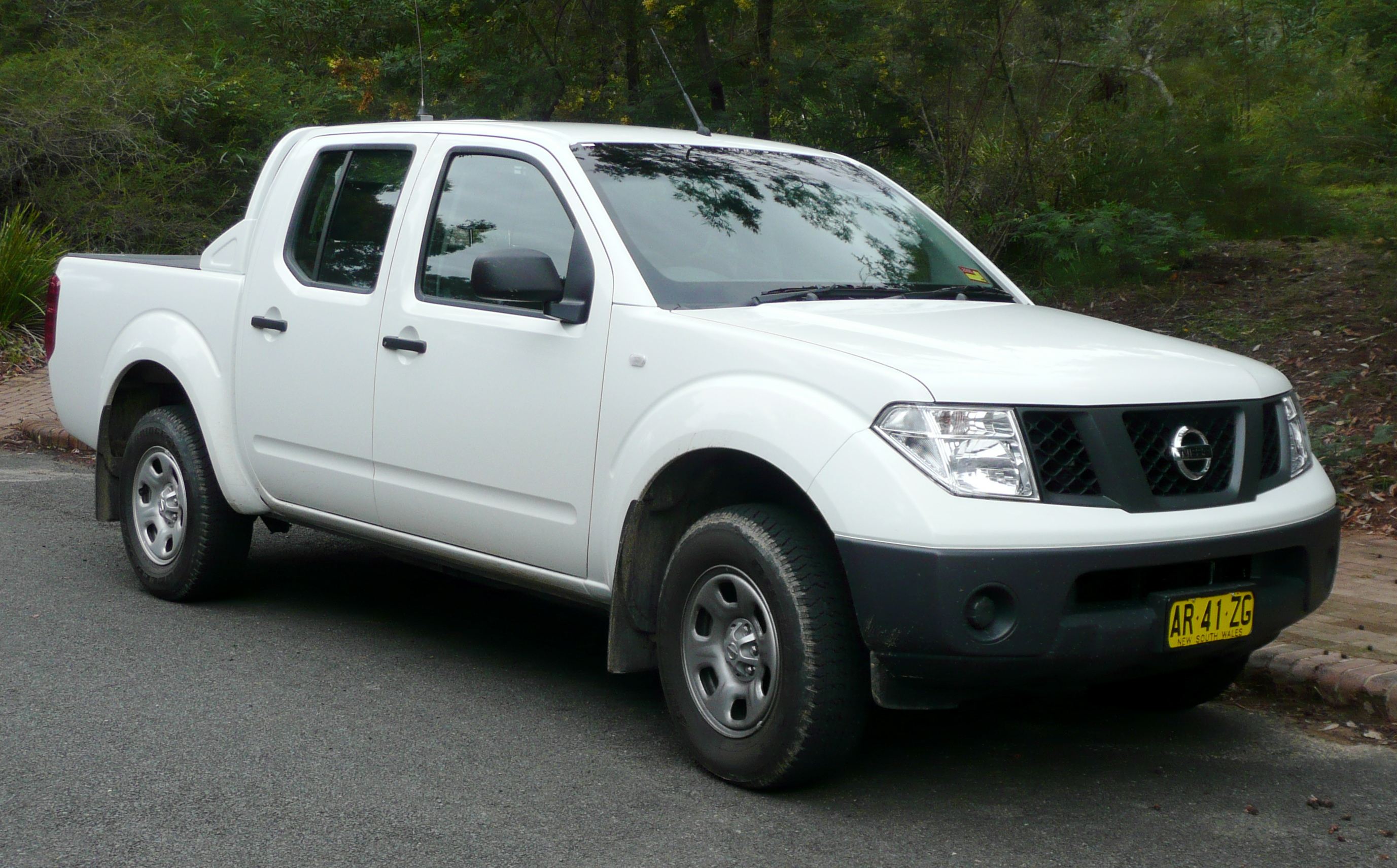
Nissan Navara RX (Australia; pre-facelift)

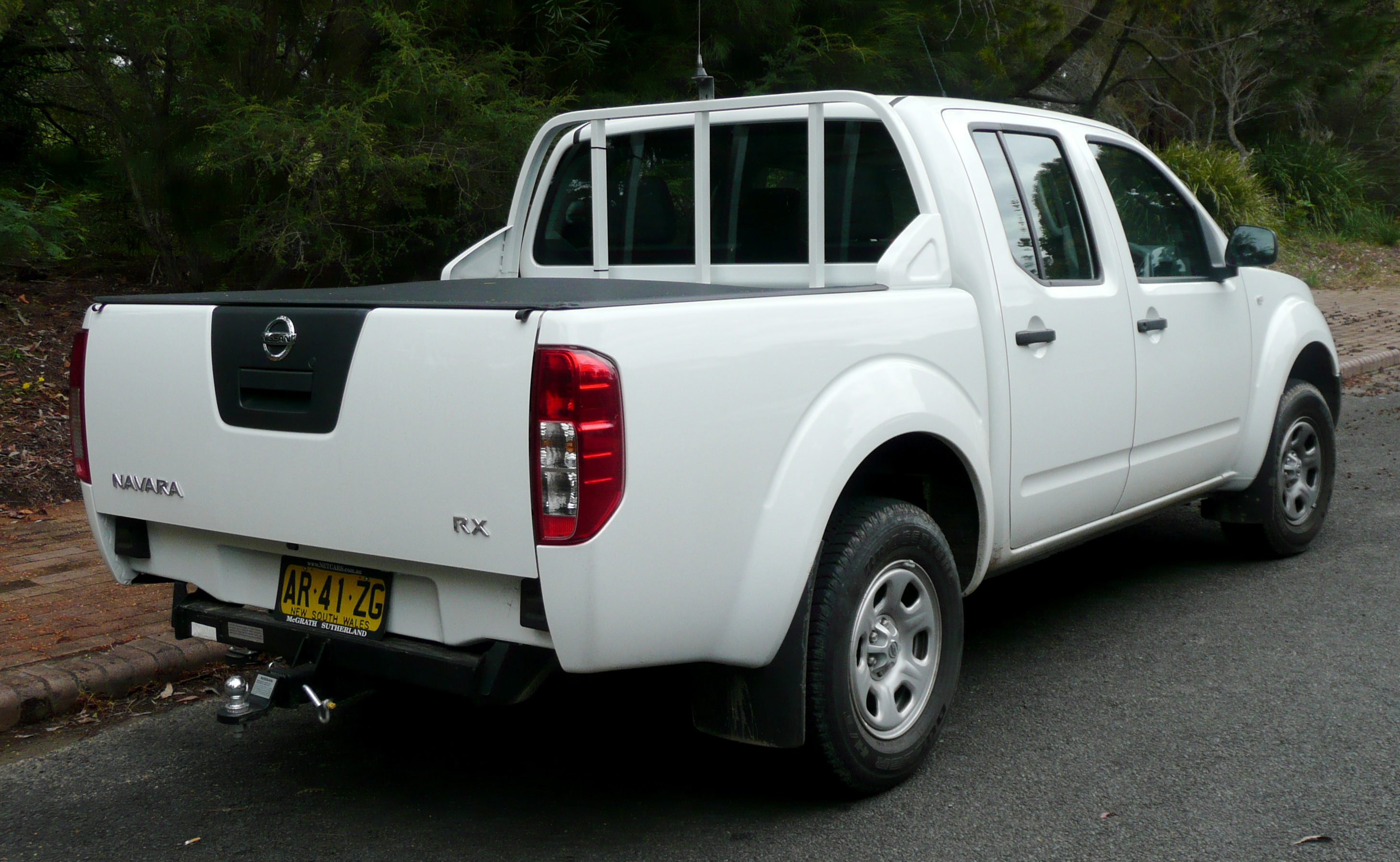
Nissan Navara RX (Australia; pre-facelift)

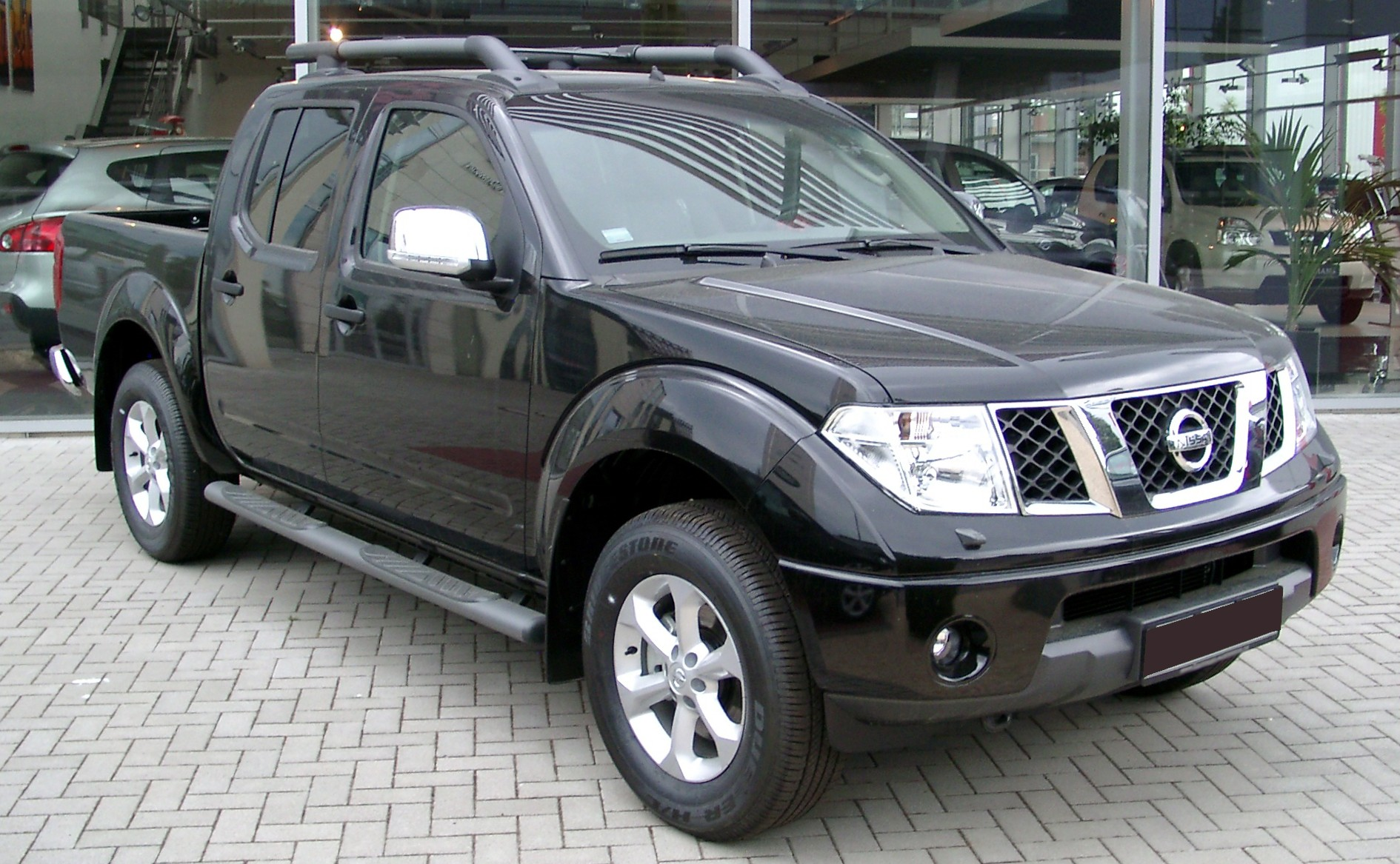
Nissan Navara (D40) (facelift)

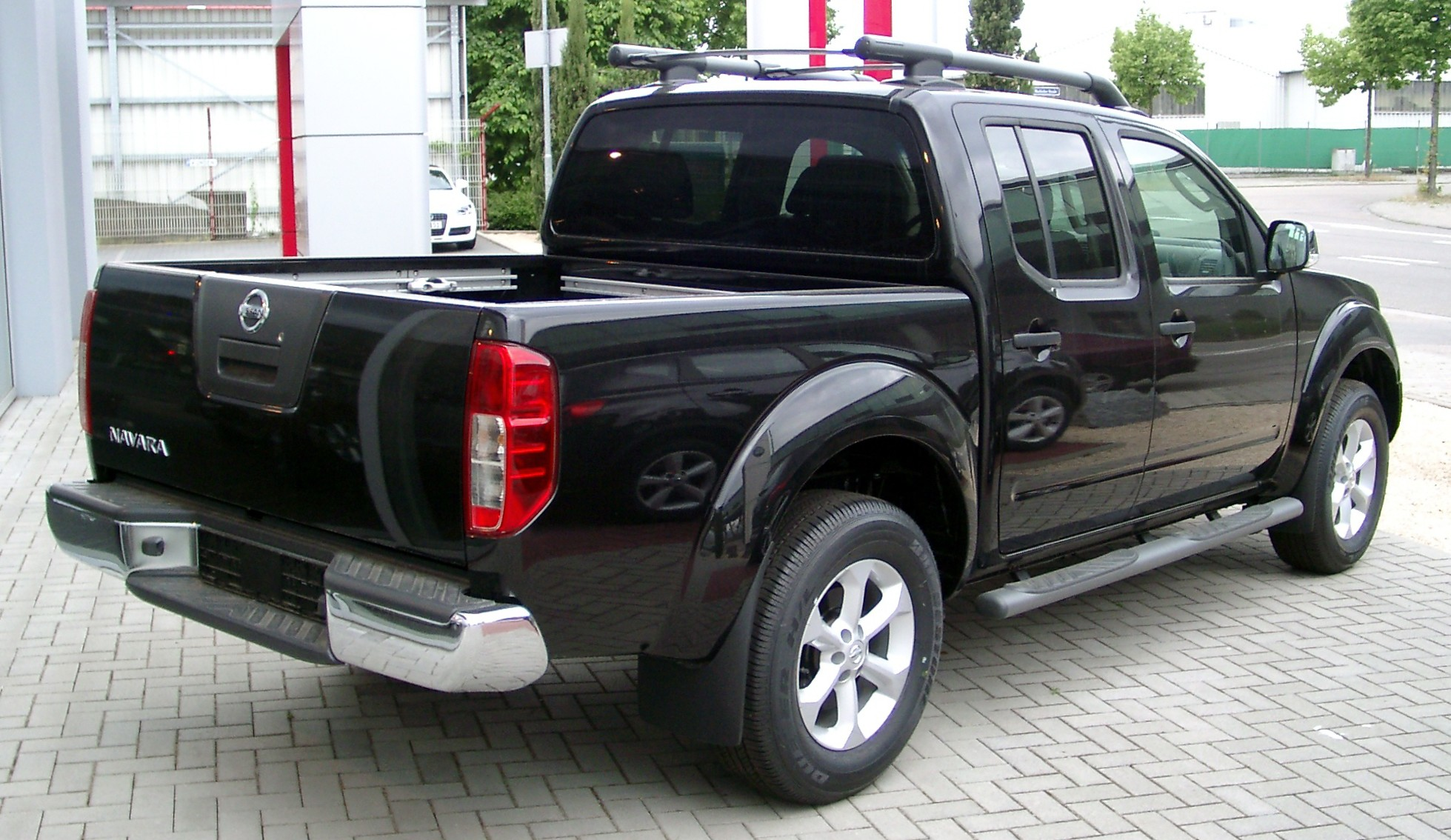
Nissan Navara (D40) (facelift)

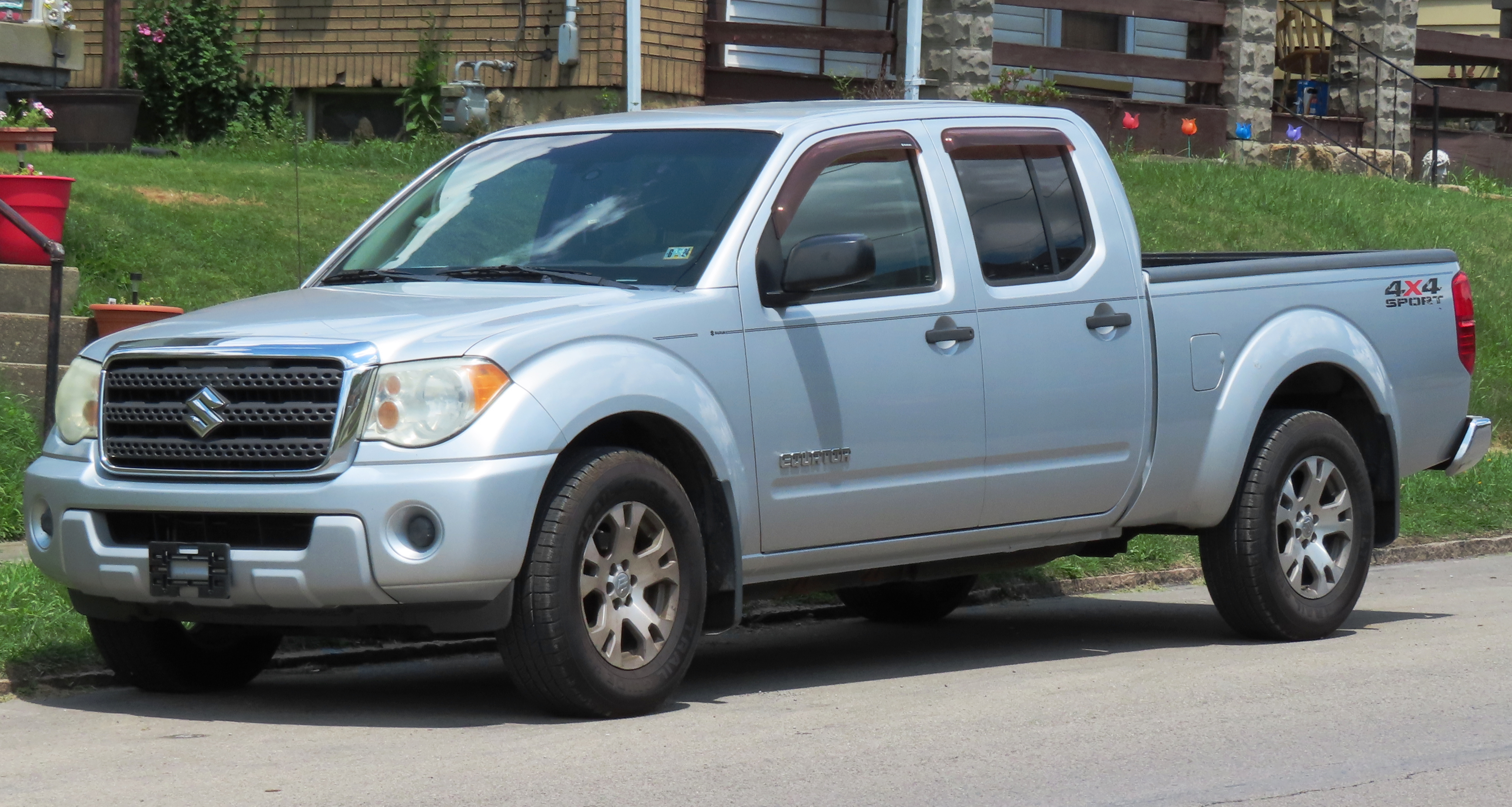
2008 Suzuki Equator

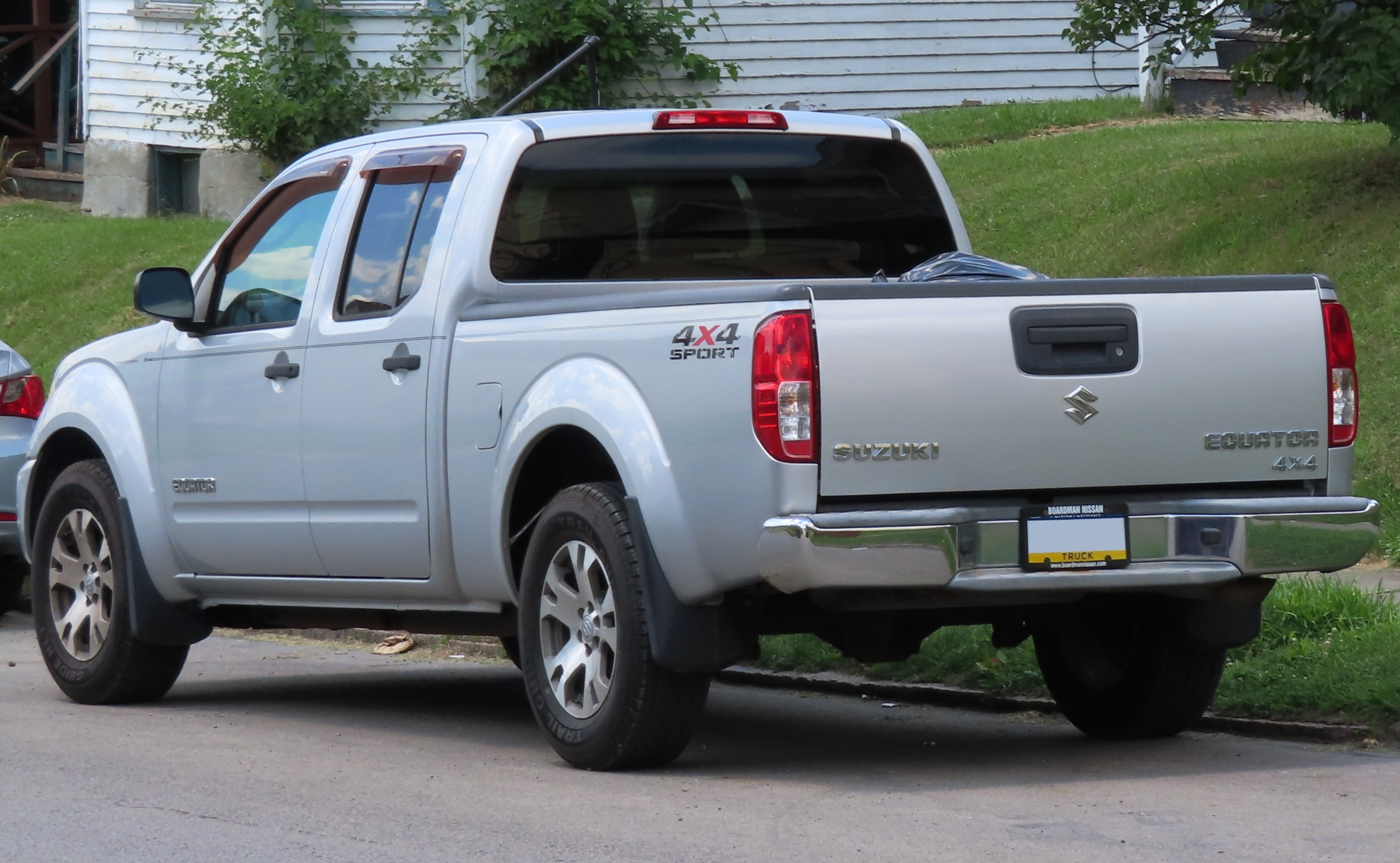
Suzuki Equator rear view

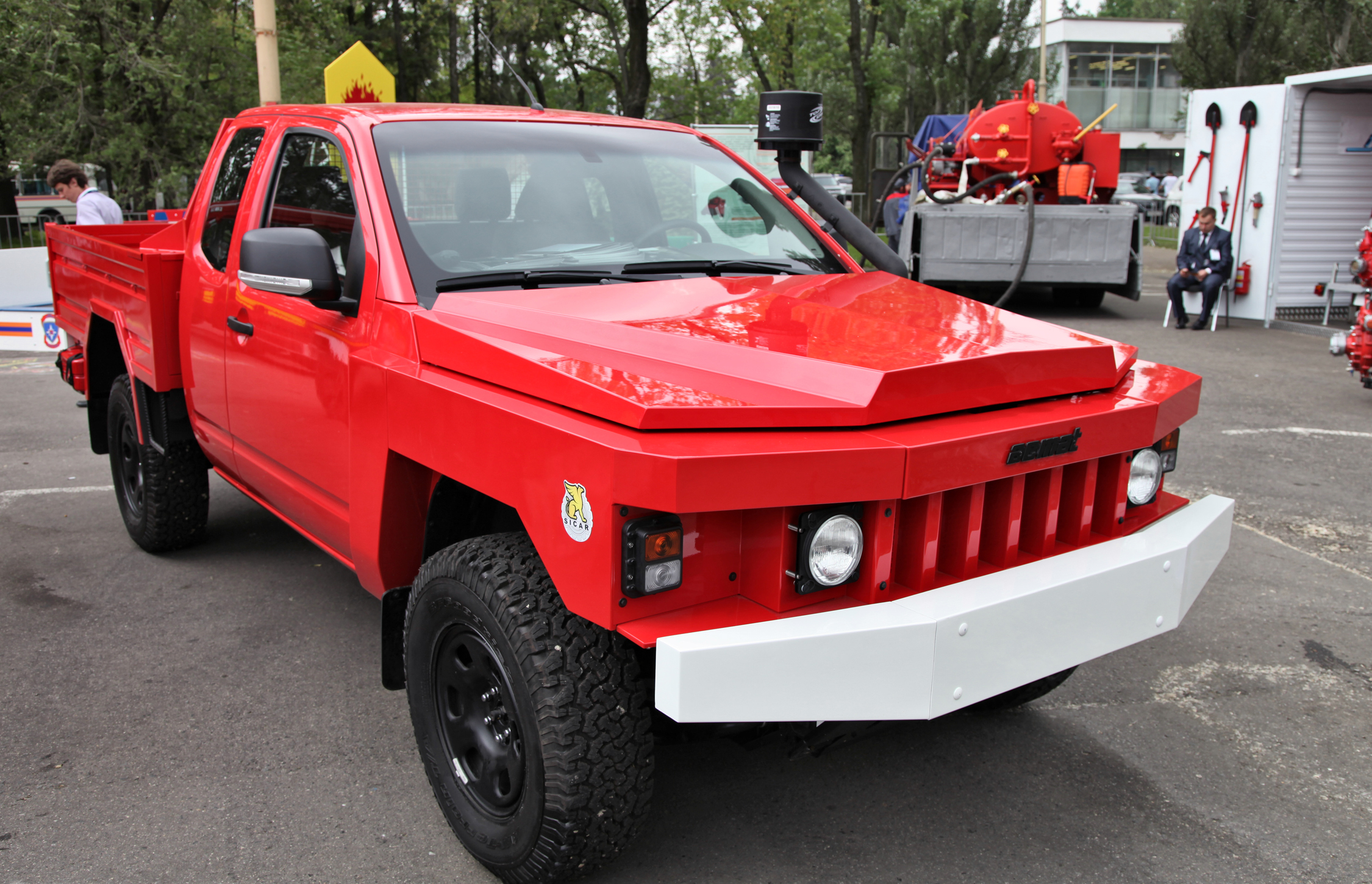
ACMAT ALTV

=== Outside the U.S. ===
The Navara in Europe came with an updated Euro IV compliant engine on post September 2006 vehicles. It has four trim levels, the S, SE, Outlaw and Aventura. The Aventura trim package is equipped with leather upholstery, dual zone climate control, six-stacker CD/MP3 changer and satellite navigation as standard.

In Australia, New Zealand, South Africa and South America, the D40 Navara has a few differences from the UK versions. There are two engines available, 2.5-litre turbocharged diesel engine and the V6 petrol. The 2.5 diesel engine Mid Power version (2WD and 4WD base models) produces 106 kW (142 hp) at 4000 rpm and 356 N⋅m (263 lb⋅ft) at 2000 rpm, High Power version (4WD upgrade models) produces 128 kW (172 hp) at 4000 rpm and 403 N⋅m (297 lb⋅ft) at 2000 rpm. The V6 produces 198 kW (266 hp) at 5600 rpm of power and 385 N⋅m (284 lb⋅ft) at 4000 rpm. Both engines come with a standard five-speed automatic, with a six-speed manual available for the diesel. These models do not have leather, climate control or satellite navigation system like their UK versions.

The 2008 model of the Navara was launched on 2 July. Changes included a new style of alloy wheels, Bluetooth as standard, side work lights and indicators on the wing mirrors.

The 2008 Single Cab became available in Thailand 6 March. The 2.5-litre engine reduces torque output from 356 to 294 N⋅m (263 to 217 lb⋅ft) at 2,000 rpm. This model has 15-inch wheels. Power steering is standard. Also available are electric mirrors and central power locking as optional extra. Nissan planned to sell the single cab and began to export worldwide at the same month. Nissan also continues to sell the D22 pickups with minor updates for a lower price (now called as Frontier LCV).

The Nissan Navara Double Cab became available in Malaysia on 5 November 2008. It is available with a 2.5-litre diesel engine producing 128 kW (174 PS; 172 bhp) and 403 N⋅m (297 lb⋅ft), only with a five-speed automatic. A year later the six-speed manual version became available. The D22 series Nissan Frontier remains on sale in Malaysia with a manual transmission.

In November 2008, Nissan Thailand Released the all-new Nissan Navara Calibre with a 144 PS (106 kW) at 4,000 rpm, 36.3 kg⋅m (356 N⋅m; 263 lb⋅ft) at 2,000 rpm engine. This was available with a five-speed automatic or a six-speed manual transmission.

=== Facelift ===
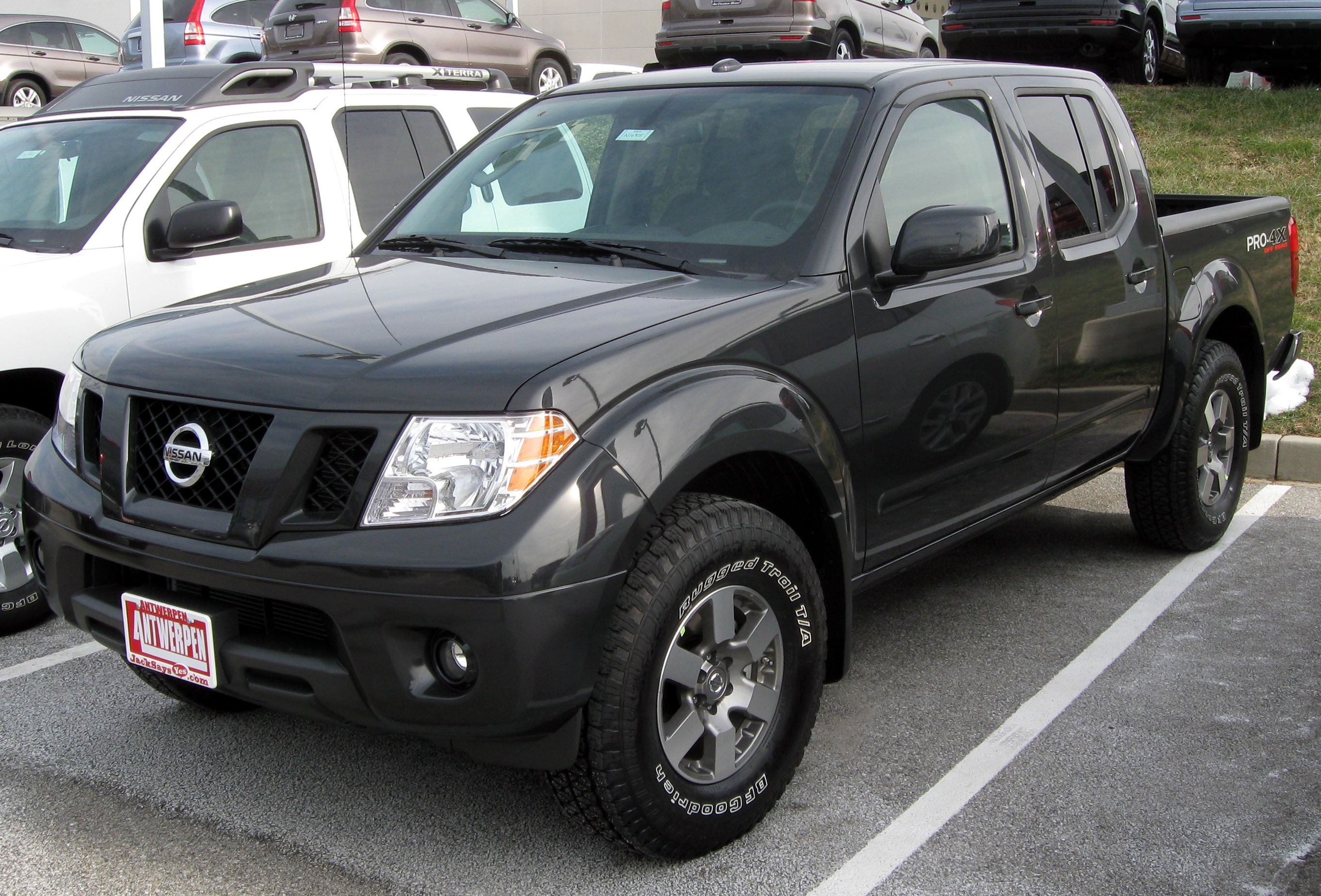
2011 Nissan Frontier Pro-4X (US)

For the North American Frontier in the 2009 model year, and the European Navara in the 2010 model year, Nissan updated the shape of some minor components.

The 2010 Nissan Navara facelift introduced a new 3.0-litre V9X V6 turbodiesel engine producing 240 hp (179 kW) and 369 lb⋅ft (500 N⋅m) at 2,500 rpm and a revised 2.5-litre dCi unit (YD25DDTi High Power) which produces 190 PS (140 kW) and 450 N⋅m (332 lb⋅ft) of torque. The 2011 Nissan Navara and Pathfinder facelift V6 develop 170 kW (231 PS) and 550 N⋅m (406 lb⋅ft) of torque between 1,700 rpm and 2,500 rpm and the VQ40DE remains the same with the 261 hp (195 kW) at 5600 rpm; 281 lb⋅ft (381 N⋅m) at 4000 rpm.

There are subtle changes to the headlights and bonnet. The V-shaped grille shell is less pronounced and the bumper is rounder and projects 80 mm further forward, but the six-spoke 17-inch alloy wheels or optional 18-inch alloy wheels are the biggest change.

Inside the new Navara (top-of-the-line model), Nissan designers have specified softer materials of a better quality for the dash, seats and interior moulds. The centre console and fascia designs have been revised, as have the instrument binnacle layout and door trims. Additional bright/gloss finish surfacing is used throughout the cabin. The six-stack CD audio system or the TV Navigation entertainment console is upgraded with speed-sensing volume, MP3 compatibility and Bluetooth connectivity for the six disc CD audio system. Other new or revised features include dual-zone climate control, remote audio/Bluetooth/trip computer controls on the steering wheel, trip computer, external temperature gauge, speed-sensitive variable windscreen wipers and 'follow me home' lighting. The electric mirrors now fold in fully for car washes or parking in narrow spaces.

Importantly, the upgraded Navara (diesel only) gains stability control, which Nissan calls Vehicle Dynamics Control and all petrol V6 and diesel variants gain side-impact and side-curtain airbags to complement the dual front airbags.

Nissan updated the Frontier for the 2020 model year with a new 3.8-litre V6 and a nine-speed automatic, with the manual transmission being discontinued. The 6-speed manual is available in Canada only on the Pro-4X model. The engine replaces both the outgoing 4.0L V6 and the 2.5L I4, and produces 310 hp (231 kW), although torque remains the same. The lineup has also been revised: the Frontier King Cab model will offer both rear-wheel-drive and four-wheel-drive configurations on the S and SV models; the Crew Cab model, meanwhile, extends rear-wheel drive and four-wheel drive to the SV short bed and SV long bed trims, while the Pro-4X gets four-wheel drive exclusively. Power windows and locks are now standard on all trim levels.

=== Safety ===
The D40 Navara has undergone Euro NCAP crash testing along with the Mitsubishi Triton and Isuzu D-Max, and received one star with a strikeout; however, after retesting with upgraded computer software it went from the lowest in the group to the highest (overall) with 3 stars. Among the problems discovered during the test was delayed airbag deployment and insufficient seatbelt restraint, which were solved with the software upgrade.

==== IIHS ====
===== 2018 =====
The 2018 Frontier was tested by the IIHS:

IIHS scores
| Small overlap front (Driver) | Marginal |
| Small overlap front (Passenger) | Marginal |
| Moderate overlap front | Good |
| Side (original test) | Good |
| Roof strength | Good |
| Head restraints and seats | Acceptable |
| Headlights | Poor |
| Child seat anchors (LATCH) ease of use | Marginal |

===== 2021 =====
The 2021 Frontier was tested by the IIHS:

IIHS scores
| Small overlap front (Driver) | Marginal |
| Moderate overlap front | Good |
| Side (original test) | Good |
| Roof strength | Good |
| Head restraints and seats | Acceptable |
| Child seat anchors (LATCH) ease of use | Acceptable |

==== ANCAP ====
ANCAP test results* Nissan Navara D40 dual cab 2.5L diesel with dual frontal airbags (2008)
| Test | Score |
|---|---|
| Overall | 3 /5 stars |
| Frontal offset | 6.88/16 |
| Side impact | 16/16 |
| Pole | Not Assessed |
| Seat belt reminders | 0/3 |
| Whiplash protection | Not Assessed |
| Pedestrian protection | Marginal |
| Electronic stability control | Not Available |

ANCAP test results* Nissan Navara D22 4x2 DX cab chassis (2008)
| Test | Score |
|---|---|
| Overall | 3 /5 stars |
| Frontal offset | 5.57/16 |
| Side impact | 16/16 |
| Pole | Not Assessed |
| Seat belt reminders | 0/3 |
| Whiplash protection | Not Assessed |
| Pedestrian protection | Poor |
| Electronic stability control | Not Available |

ANCAP test results* Nissan Navara D40 dual cab 4x4 with 4 cylinder diesel engine (2012)
| Test | Score |
|---|---|
| Overall | 4 /5 stars |
| Frontal offset | 10.50/16 |
| Side impact | 16/16 |
| Pole | Not Assessed |
| Seat belt reminders | 1/3 |
| Whiplash protection | Poor |
| Pedestrian protection | Poor |
| Electronic stability control | Standard |

=== Awards and recognition ===
- 2021 Nissan Frontier is an Edmunds.com 2021 Top-Rated Midsize Truck.
- 2011 Nissan Frontier received the highest rating for Insurance Institute for Highway Safety Front, Side, and Roof Strength Evaluations.
- 2011 Nissan Frontier was an Edmunds.com 2011 Top Recommended Compact Truck.
- 2010 Nissan Frontier received the U.S. National Highway Traffic Safety Administration's Highest Side-impact Safety Rating (5 stars).
- 2010 Nissan Frontier Received J.D. Power and Associates Highest Ranked Midsize Pickup in Initial Quality Award.

== Third generation (D23; 2014) ==
Third generation
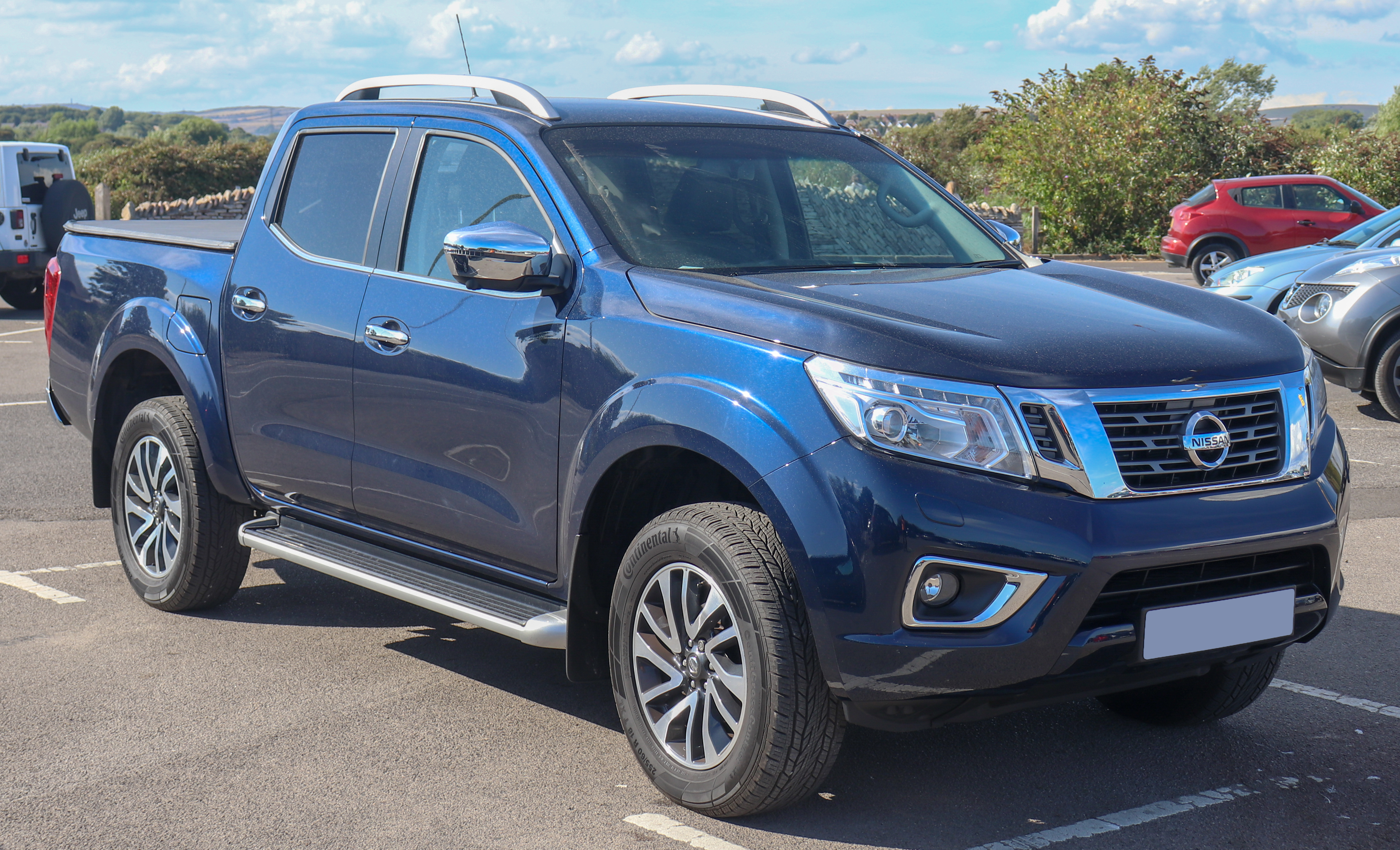
- 2017 Nissan Navara Tekna (pre-facelift; UK)

Overview
- Model code: D23
- Also called: Nissan NP300; Nissan NP300 Navara; Renault Alaskan; Mercedes-Benz X-Class; Dongfeng Ruiqi 6/Rich 6 (China); Dongfeng Ruiqi 7/Rich 7 (China)
- Production: 2014–present 2015–2021 (Spain); 2015–present (Mexico); 2017–present (China); 2018–2025 (Argentina)
- Assembly: Thailand: Samut Prakan (Nissan Motor Thailand); Spain: Barcelona (Nissan Motor Ibérica); Mexico: Cuernavaca, Morelos (Nissan Mexico); Argentina: Santa Isabel (Renault Argentina); China: Zhengzhou, Henan (Zhengzhou Nissan); South Africa: Rosslyn, Gauteng (NSA)
- Designer: Mamoru Aoki

Body and chassis
- Class: Mid-size pickup truck
- Related: Nissan Terra

Powertrain
- Engine: Petrol: 2.5 L QR25DE; 2.0 L 4K31TD turbo I4; Diesel: 2.3 L YS23DDT turbo I4; 2.3 L YS23DDTT twin-turbo I4; 2.5 L YD25DDTi turbo I4 (VGT)
- Transmission: Jatco 7-speed automatic; 6-speed manual

Dimensions
- Wheelbase: 3,150 mm (124.0 in)
- Length: 5,260–5,311 mm (207.1–209.1 in)
- Width: 1,850–1,875 mm (72.8–73.8 in)
- Height: 1,810–1,855 mm (71.3–73.0 in)
- Curb weight: 1,628–2,298 kg (3,589–5,066 lb)

Chronology
- Predecessor: D40 Series
- Successor: Nissan Frontier Pro/Navara Pro (China and Middle East)

On 11 June 2014, Nissan unveiled the third generation Navara, codenamed the D23 and released as the NP300 Navara. Series production commenced at a new $360 million (~$482 million in 2025) plant in Samut Prakan, Thailand in July 2014 and deliveries began in August. The D23 is not available in the US or Canada in favour of the larger D41 Frontier, replacing the D40. The European model will feature a 2.3-litre engine from the Nissan NV400.

After the release of the D23, which is only available with 4-cylinder engines, the D40 remained in production only with the V6 and automatic transmission.

For the 2018 model year, the Navara is equipped with Nissan Intelligent Mobility technology which include an Around View Monitor and a blind-spot monitoring system.

In 2019 Nissan launched the N-Trek Warrior with modifications done by Premcar. It is an off-roading focused trim.

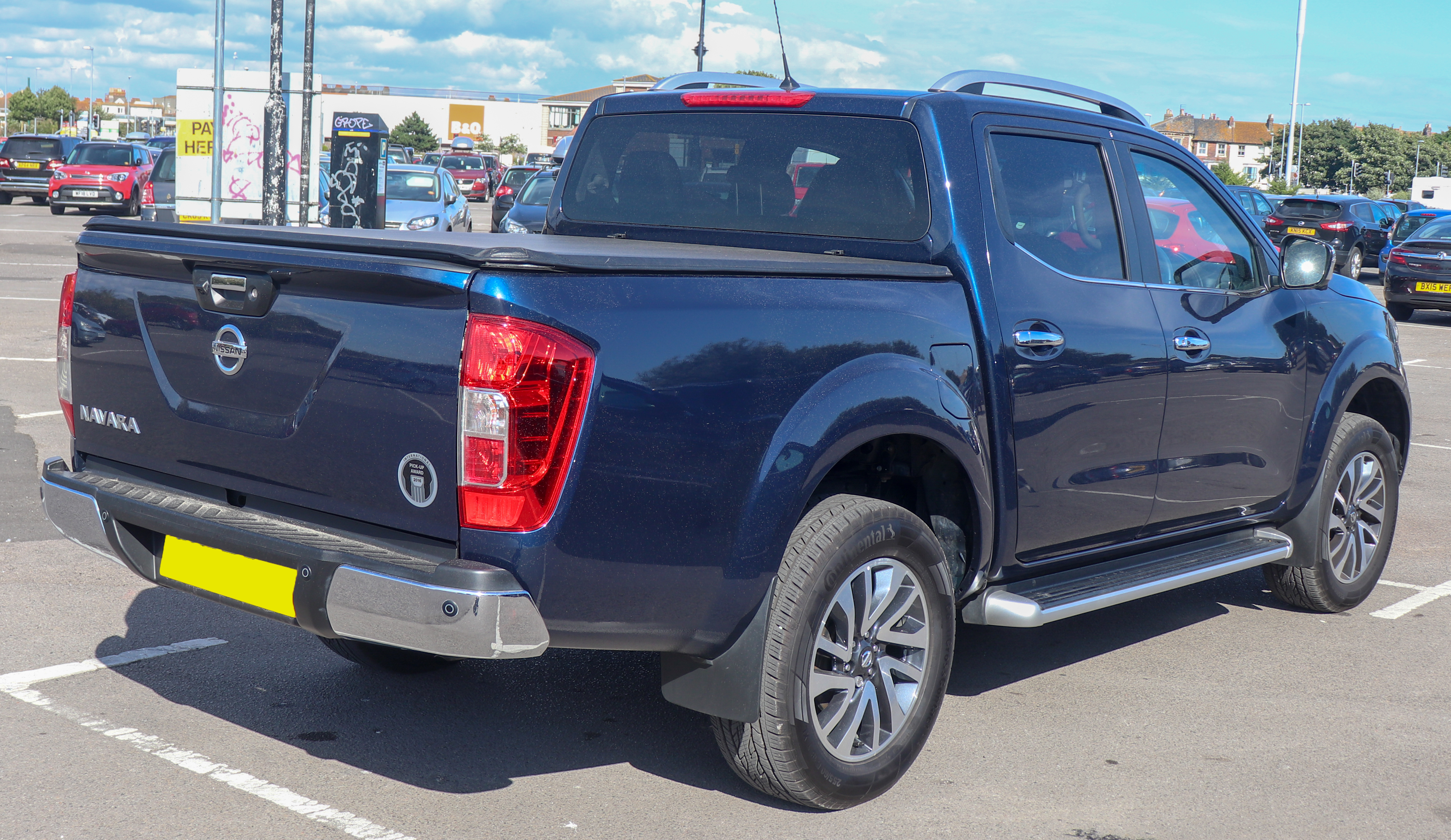
Rear view

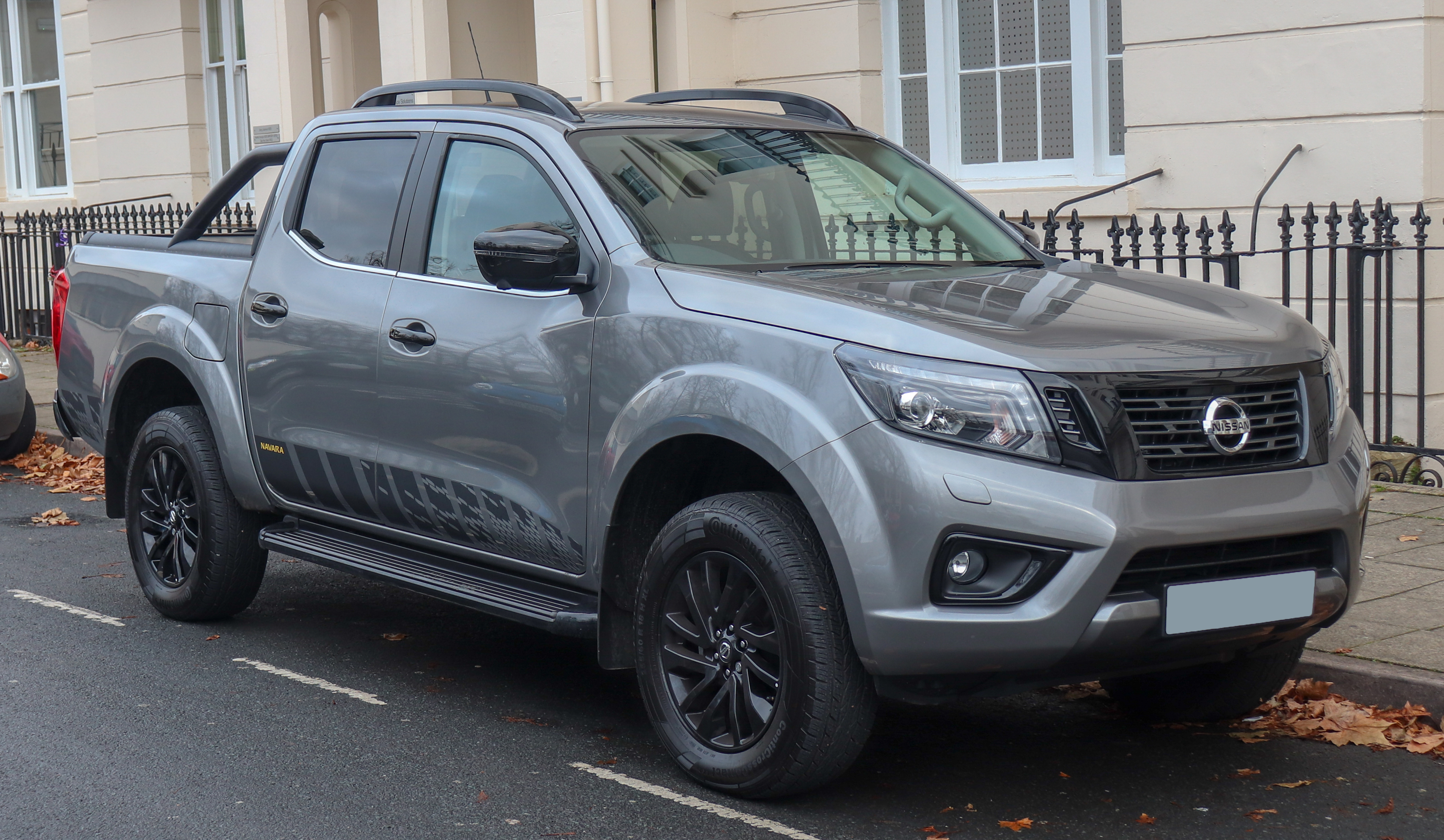
2018 Nissan Navara N-Guard (pre-facelift; UK)

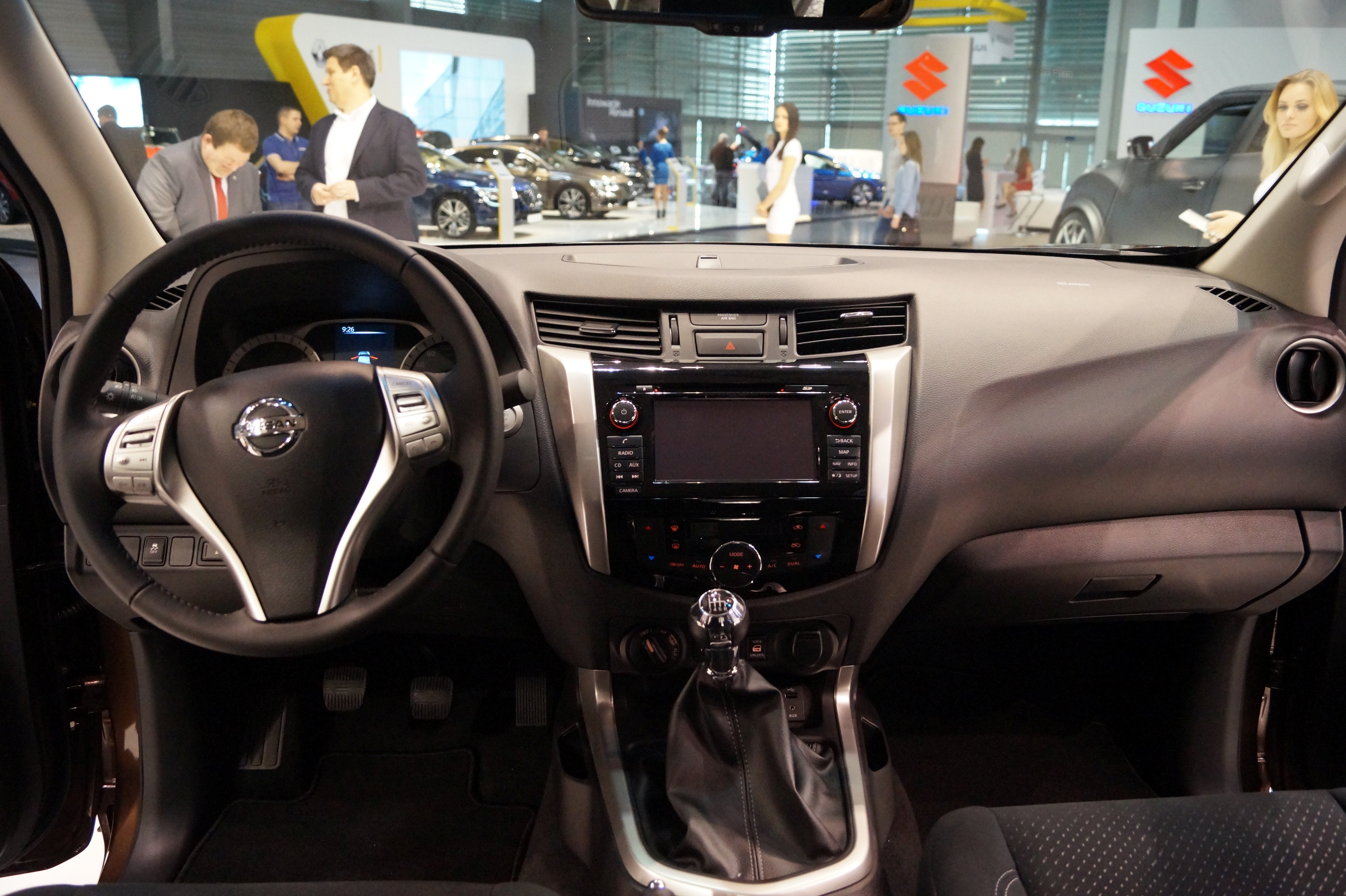
Interior

=== Safety ===
The Latin American 2022 Frontier has disc brakes on all wheels.

==== Latin NCAP ====
The Frontier/Navara in its most basic Latin American market configuration with 2 airbags received 4 stars for adult occupants and 4 stars for infants from Latin NCAP 2.0 in 2019.

Latin NCAP 2.0 test results Nissan Frontier / NP300 Navara (double cabs) + 2 Airbags (2019, based on Euro NCAP 2008)
| Test | Points | Stars |
|---|---|---|
| Adult occupant: | 28.47/34.0 | 4 /5 stars |
| Child occupant: | 36.42/49.00 | 4 /5 stars |

==== ANCAP ====
ANCAP test results* Nissan Navara all single cab variants (2015)
| Test | Score |
|---|---|
| Overall | 5 /5 stars |
| Frontal offset | 14.01/16 |
| Side impact | 16/16 |
| Pole | 2/2 |
| Seat belt reminders | 2/3 |
| Whiplash protection | Good |
| Pedestrian protection | Marginal |
| Electronic stability control | Standard |

ANCAP test results* Nissan Navara all king cab variants (2015)
| Test | Score |
|---|---|
| Overall | 5 /5 stars |
| Frontal offset | 14.01/16 |
| Side impact | 16/16 |
| Pole | 2/2 |
| Seat belt reminders | 3/3 |
| Whiplash protection | Good |
| Pedestrian protection | Marginal |
| Electronic stability control | Standard |

ANCAP test results* Nissan Navara all dual cab variants (2015)
| Test | Score |
|---|---|
| Overall | 5 /5 stars |
| Frontal offset | 14.01/16 |
| Side impact | 16/16 |
| Pole | 2/2 |
| Seat belt reminders | 3/3 |
| Whiplash protection | Good |
| Pedestrian protection | Marginal |
| Electronic stability control | Standard |

ANCAP test results* Nissan Navara all variants (2015)
| Test | Score |
|---|---|
| Overall | 5 /5 stars |
| Frontal offset | 14.01/16 |
| Side impact | 16/16 |
| Pole | 2/2 |
| Seat belt reminders | 3/3 |
| Whiplash protection | Good |
| Pedestrian protection | Marginal |
| Electronic stability control | Standard |

=== 2020 facelift ===
On 5 November 2020, Nissan unveiled the facelifted D23 Navara along with the introduction of the Pro-4X trim level. The engines remain the same, but active safety equipment has been added. The facelifted model went on sale in Australia in the first quarter of 2021.

The pre-facelift model was produced in Barcelona plant for European markets until 16 December 2021. The reasons are declining sales of the Navara in the region and the fact the plant has been shut down.

In March 2022, Nissan started producing the facelifted Frontier in Argentina. As of 2022, 34% of its parts are locally made and 65% of its production (including the Renault Alaskan) is exported.

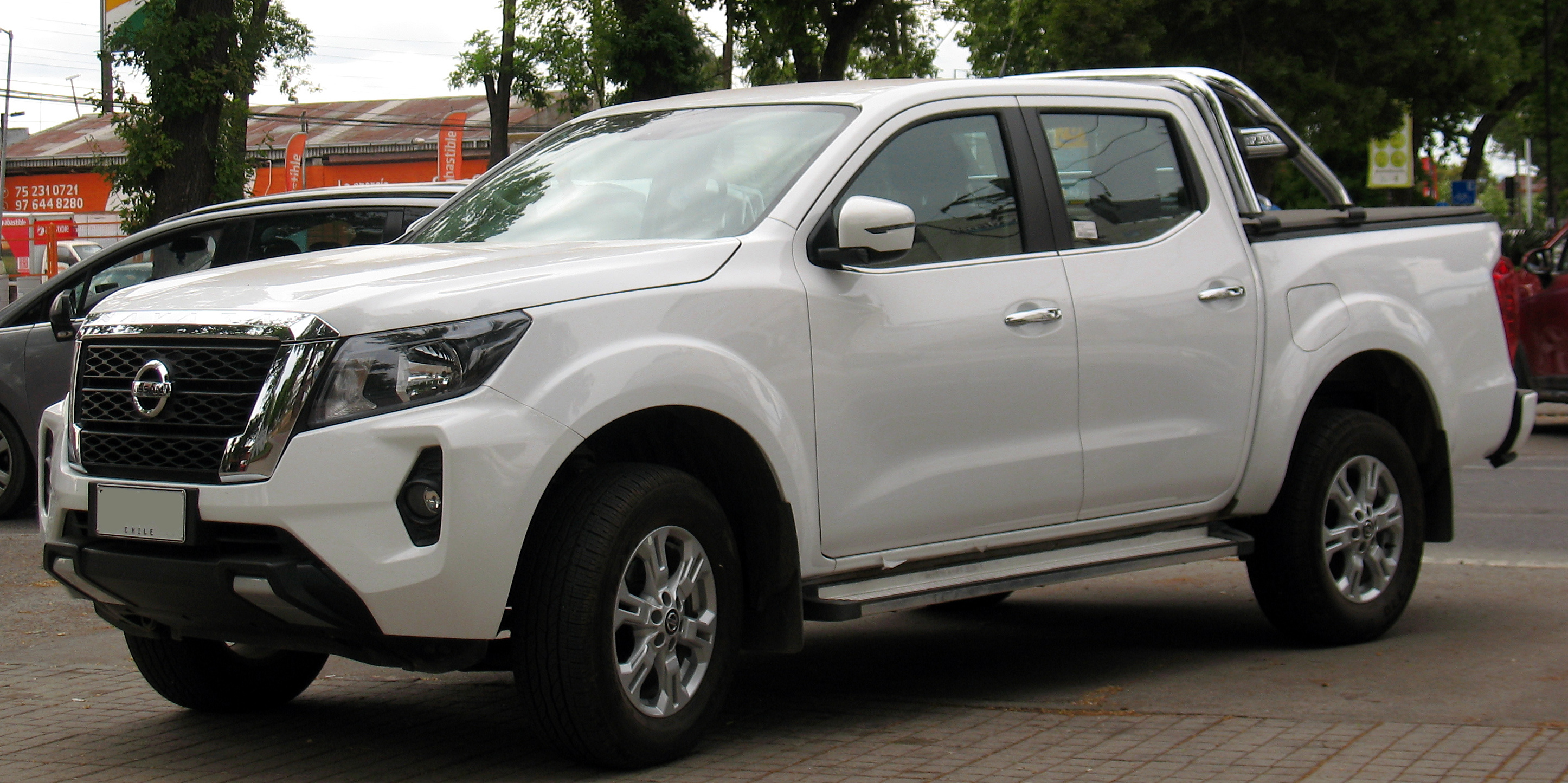
2022 Nissan Navara (facelift; Chile)

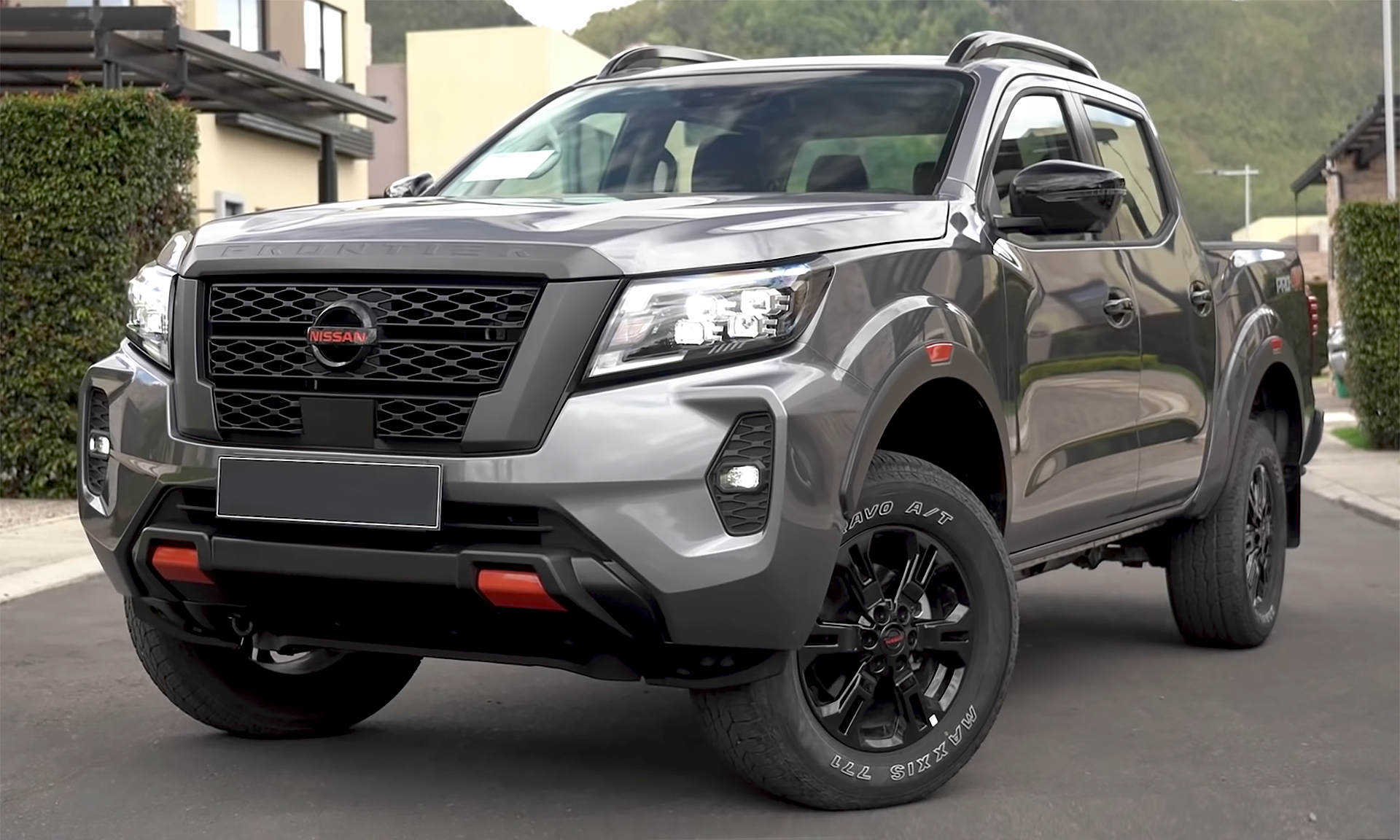
2021 Nissan Navara Pro 4X (facelift; Colombia)

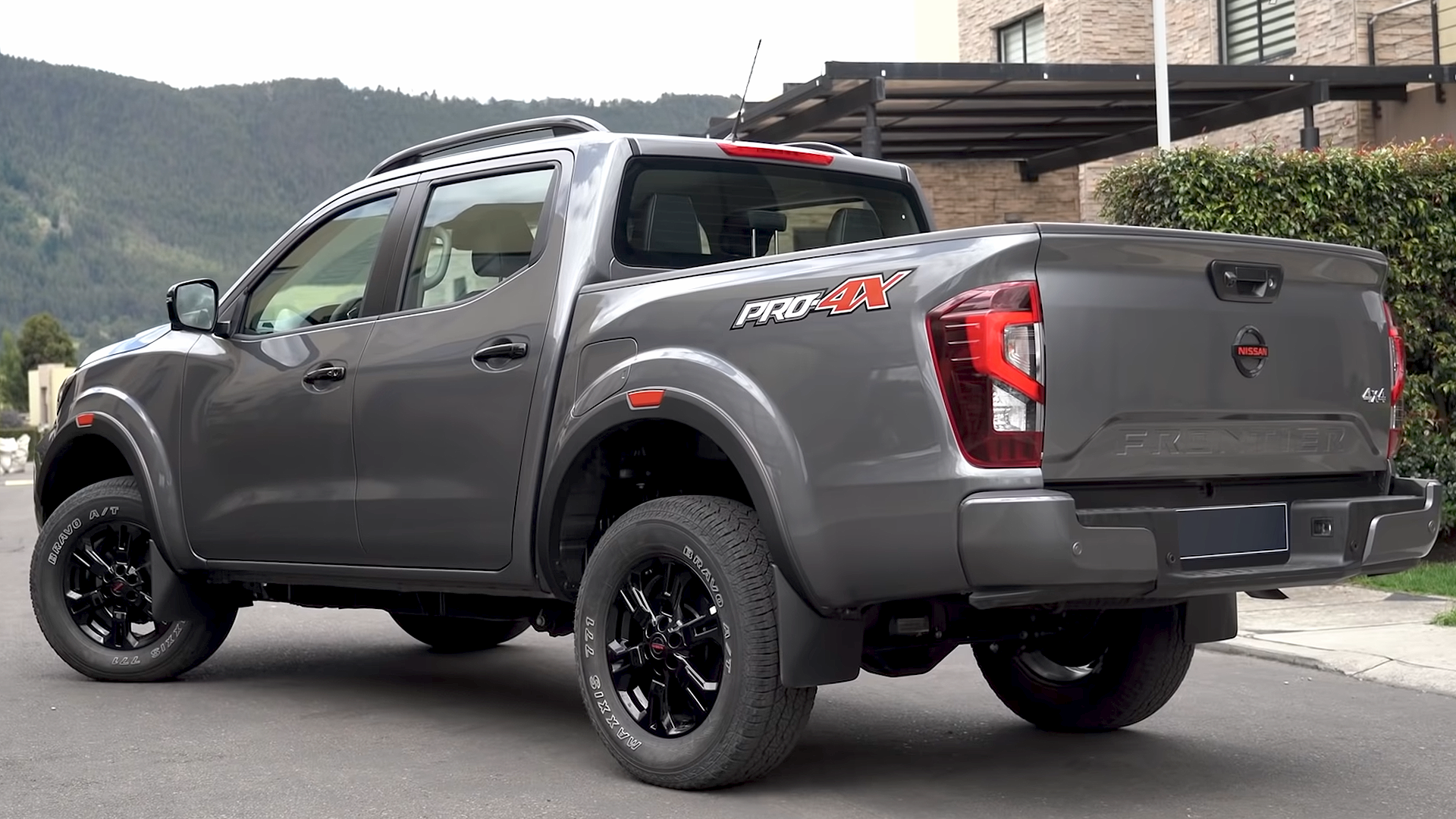
2021 Nissan Navara Pro 4X (facelift; Colombia)

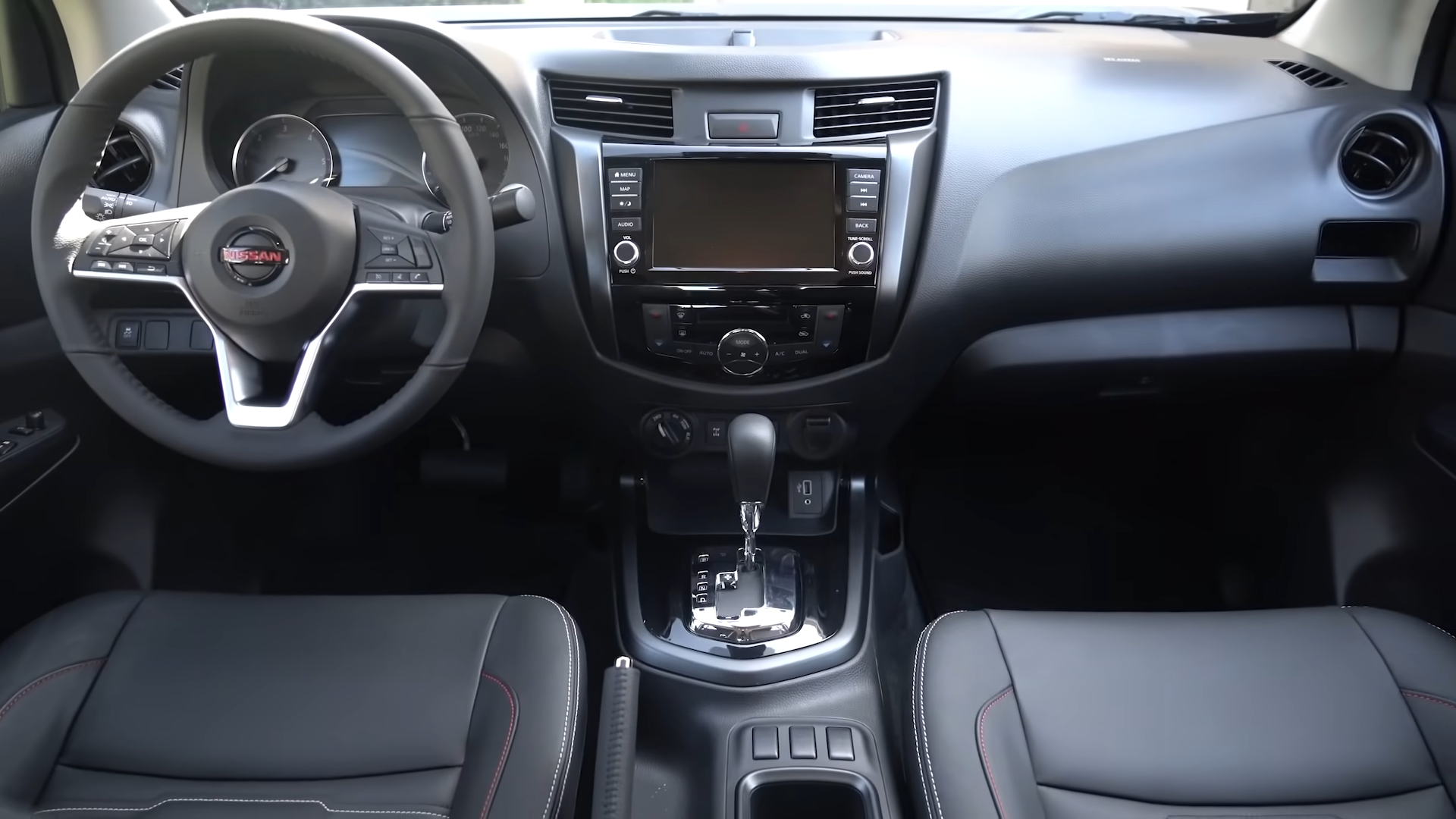
Interior

=== Nissan Navara EnGuard Concept ===
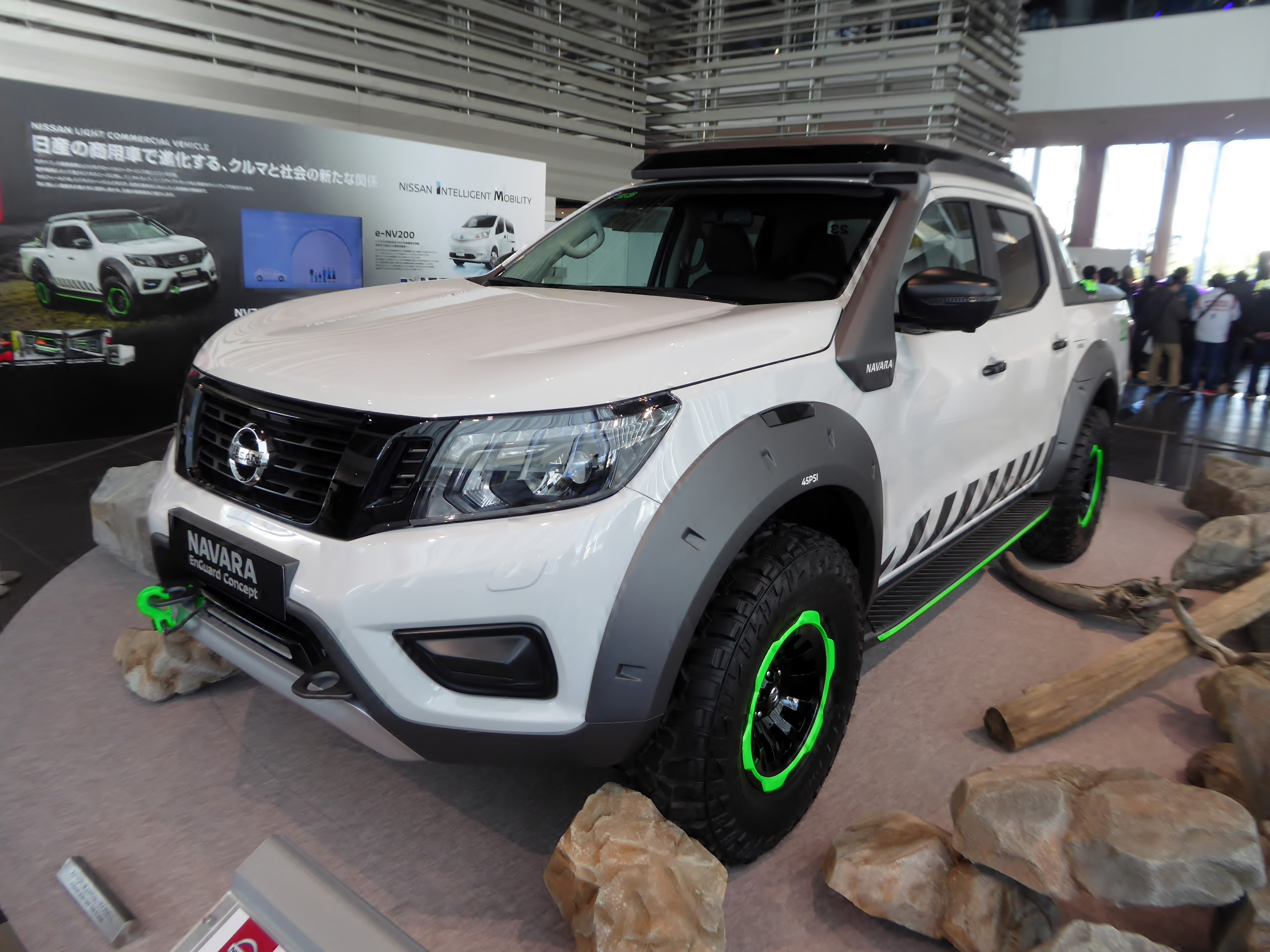
Navara EnGuard Concept (front)

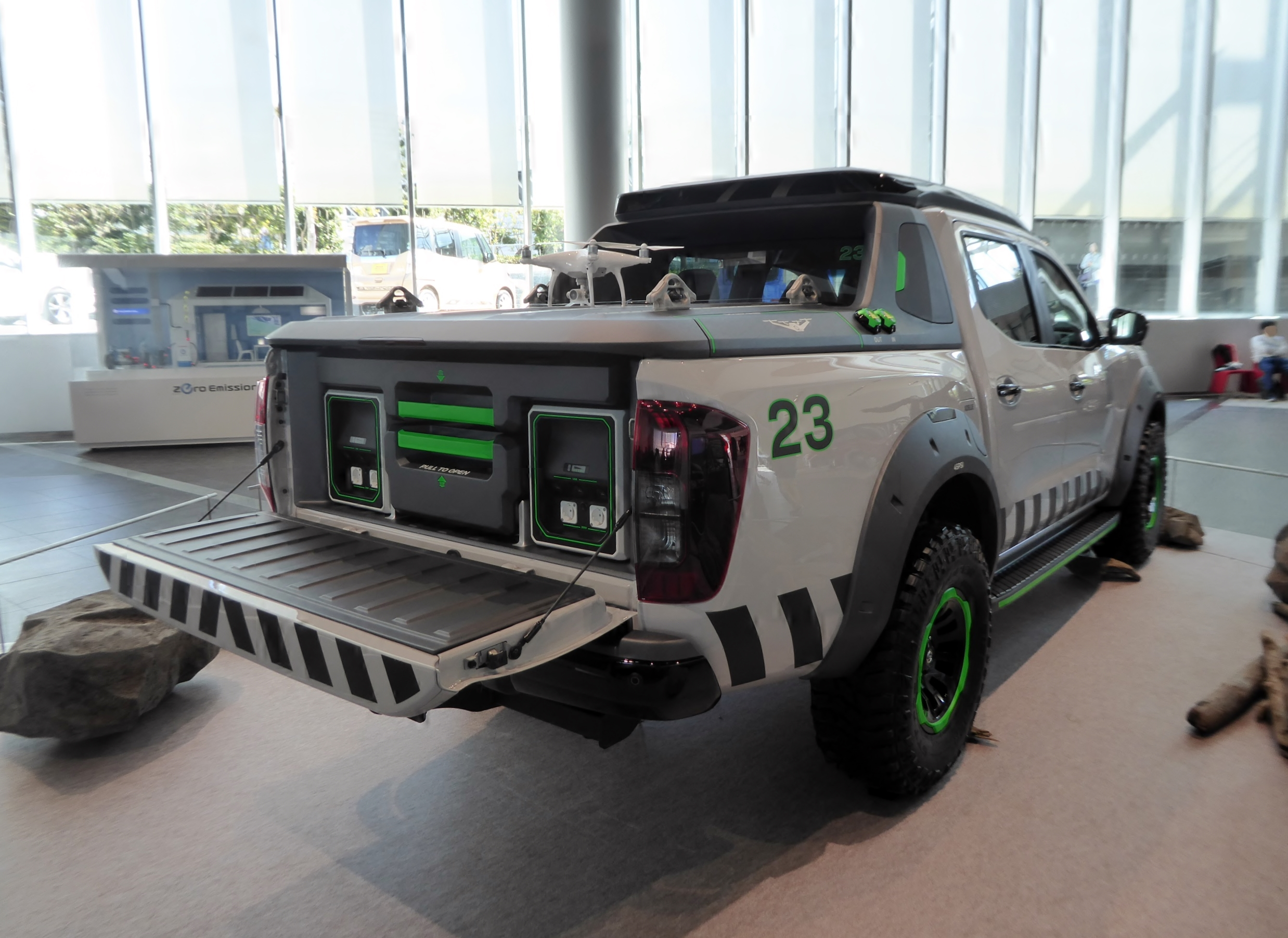
Navara EnGuard Concept (rear)

The EnGuard concept is a modified D23 Navara pitched directly towards emergency rescue organisations. Unveiled at the 2016 Hannover Motor Show, the concept is notable for being the first prototype with a Nissan designed and developed portable battery pack. Other features that cater for rescue organisations include an onboard DJI Phantom 4 drone, an increased ride height, strobe lights and a fully adjustable suspension system.

=== Renault Alaskan ===
Renault revealed the production version of the Alaskan Pickup Concept which will be based on the current Navara platform. The Alaskan was shown alongside other Renault Models at the 2016 Paris Motor Show in October.

From October 2016, the Alaskan is sold in Colombia. The pick-up was sold throughout Europe in 2017.

Production started in Santa Isabel, Argentina from October 2020 to October 9, 2025 for Latin American markets.

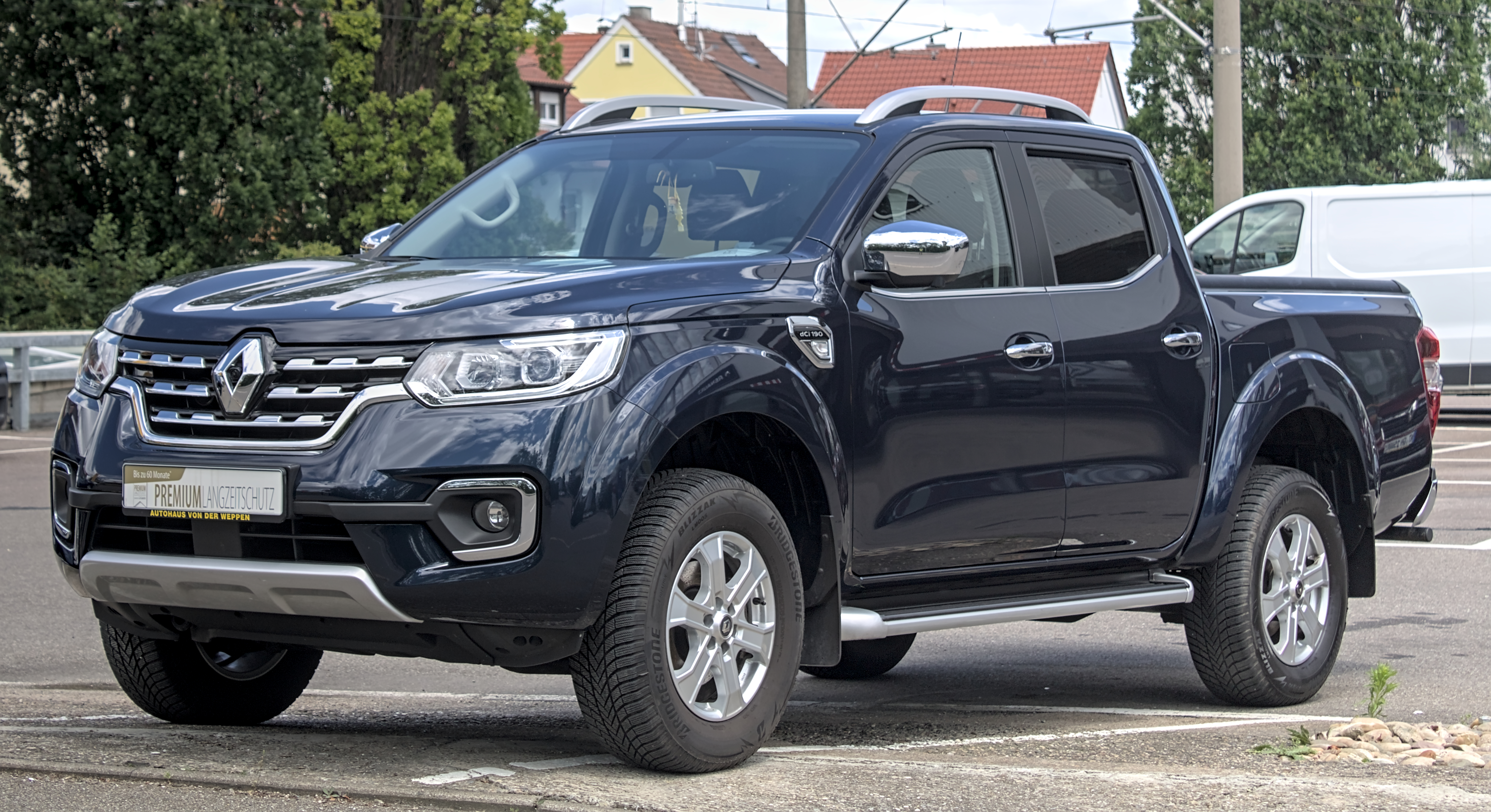
Renault Alaskan

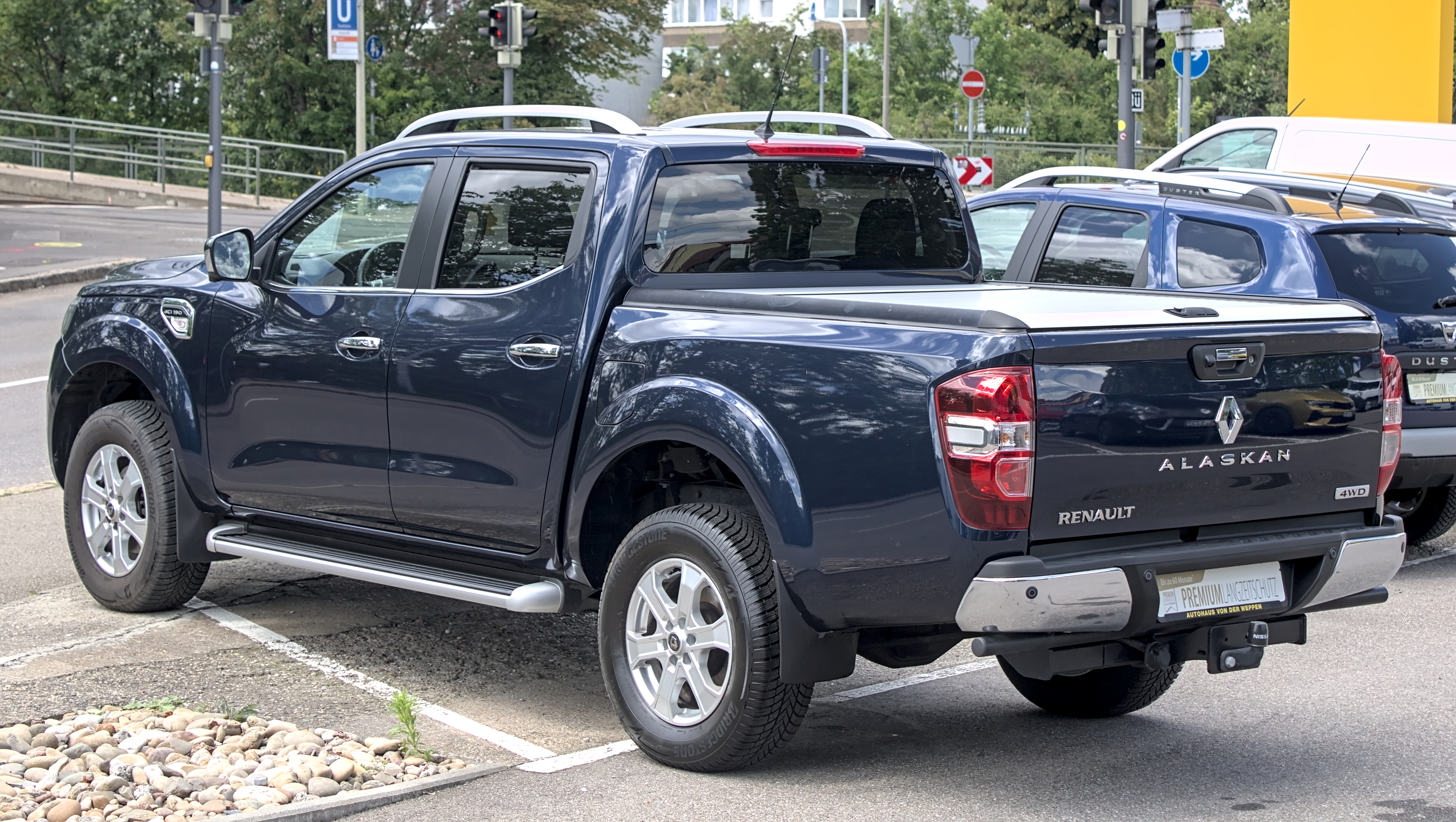
Rear view

=== Mercedes-Benz X-Class ===
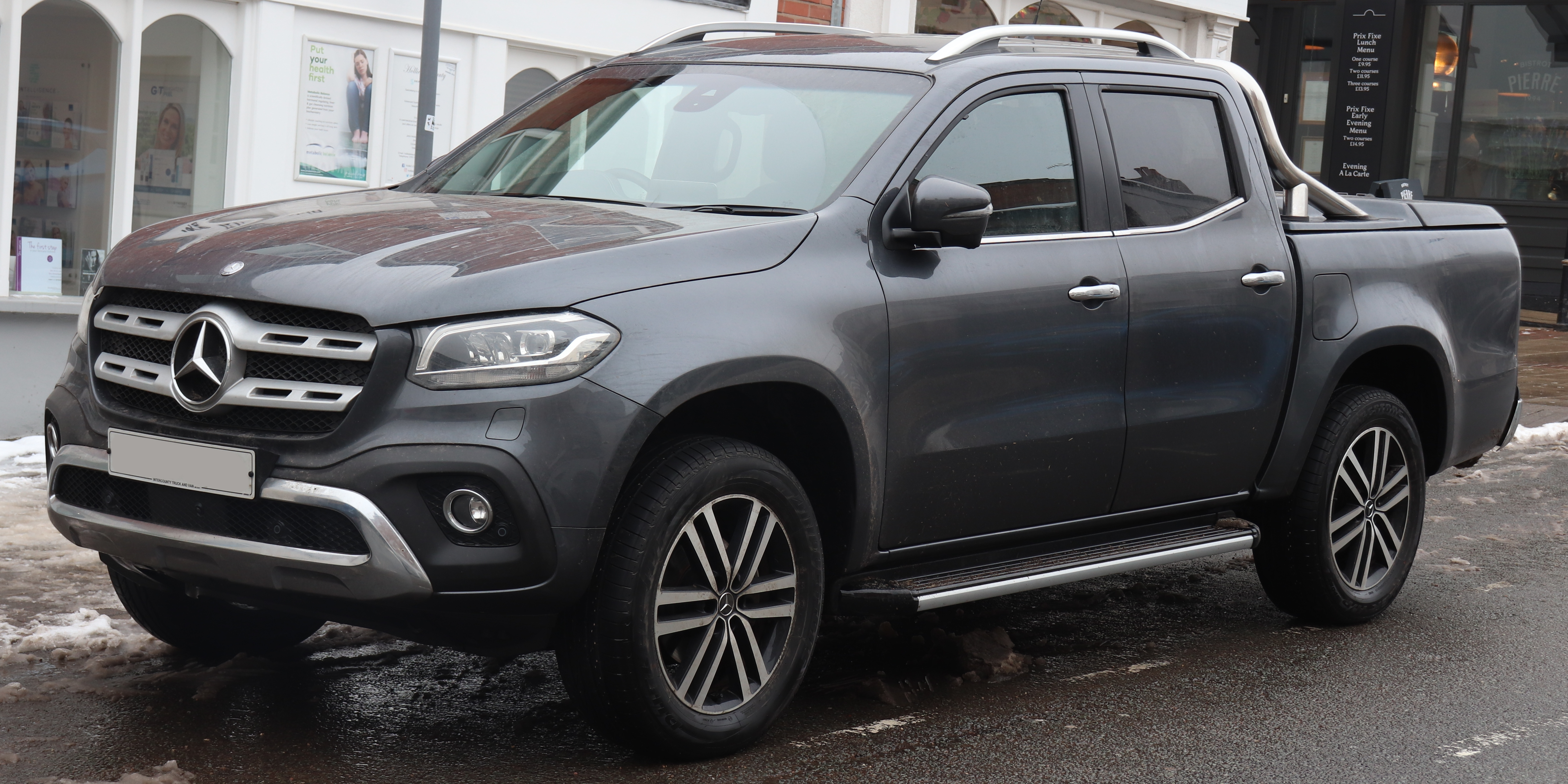
Mercedes-Benz X-Class

On 25 October 2016, Mercedes-Benz revealed 2 concept pickup trucks previewing the upcoming joint-built pickup to be called "X-Class". The X-Class is based on the platform of the D23 Navara and is built in Barcelona, Spain with planned production in Córdoba, Argentina, however, the latter was cancelled due to a disagreement between Nissan and Mercedes-Benz regarding production costs as well as that country's economic situation. Production of the X-Class was discontinued in 2020 due to poor sales.

=== Dongfeng Rich 6 ===
In October 2018, the Dongfeng Rich 6 was launched as a more premium pickup option under the Dongfeng Motor Co., Ltd. brand and produced by Zhengzhou Nissan alongside the Chinese market. The Dongfeng Rich 6 features a redesigned front end resulting in an extra 35 mm of length with the rest of the vehicle body being shared directly with the Navara.

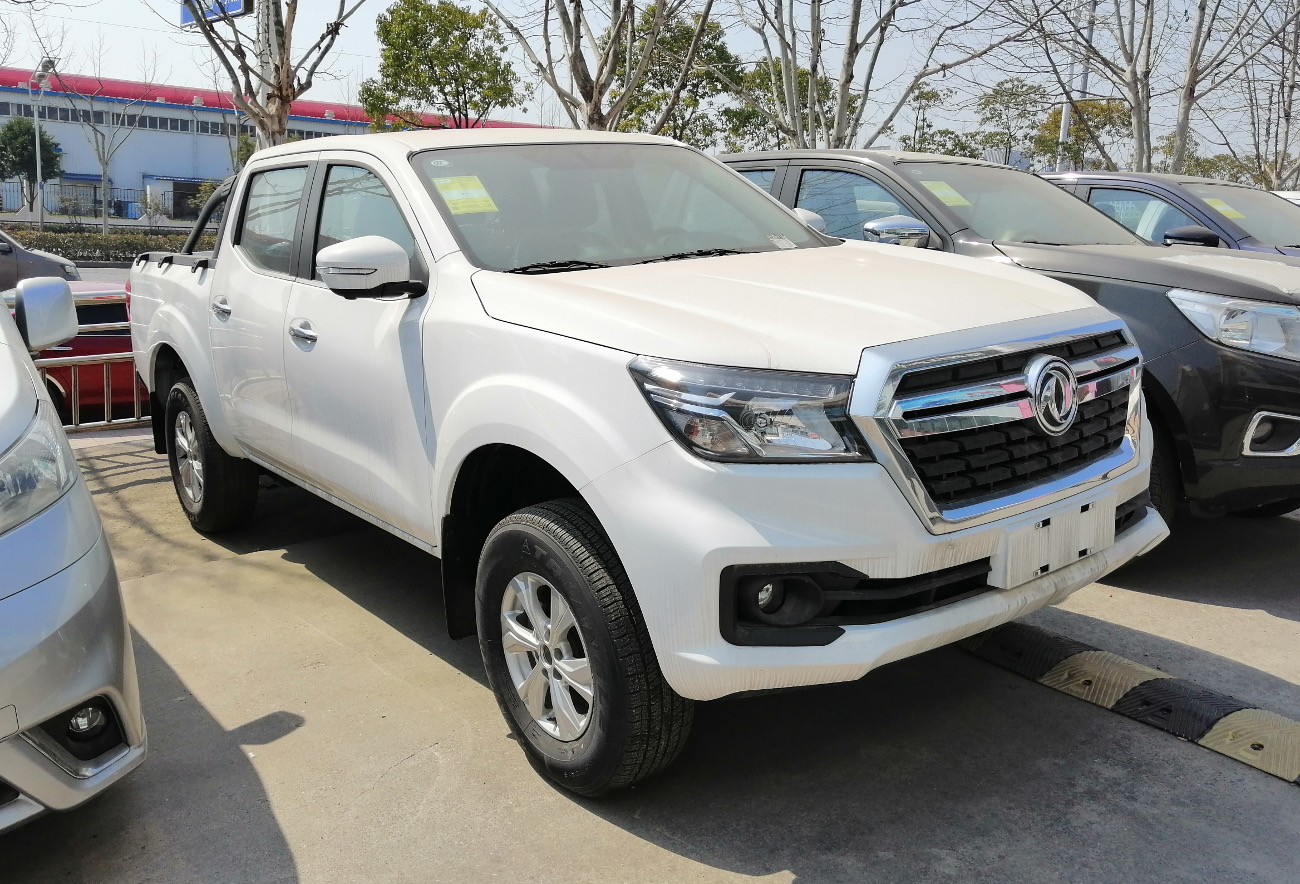
Dongfeng Rich 6

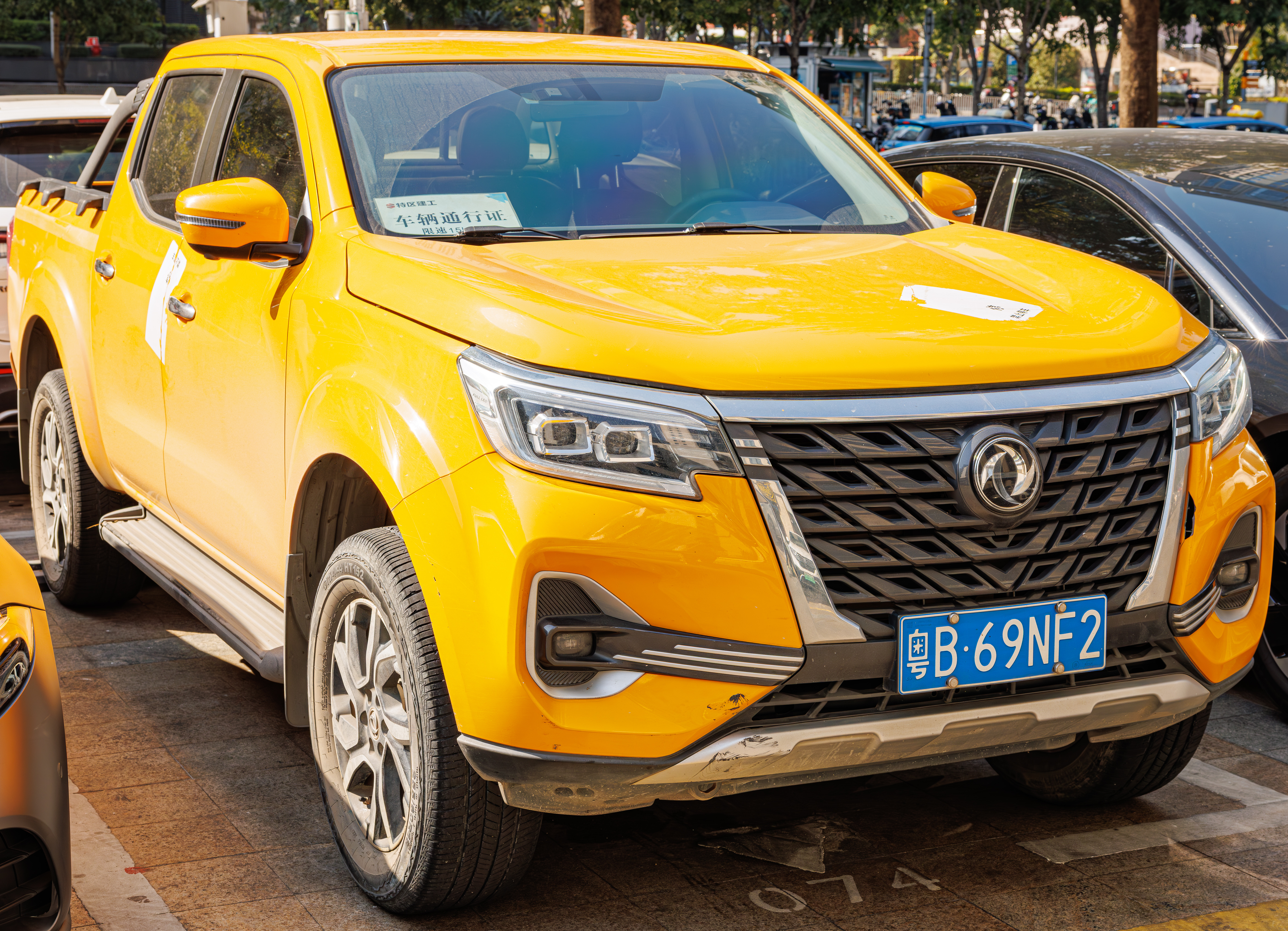
Dongfeng Rich 7

== Fourth generation (D27; 2025) ==
Fourth generation
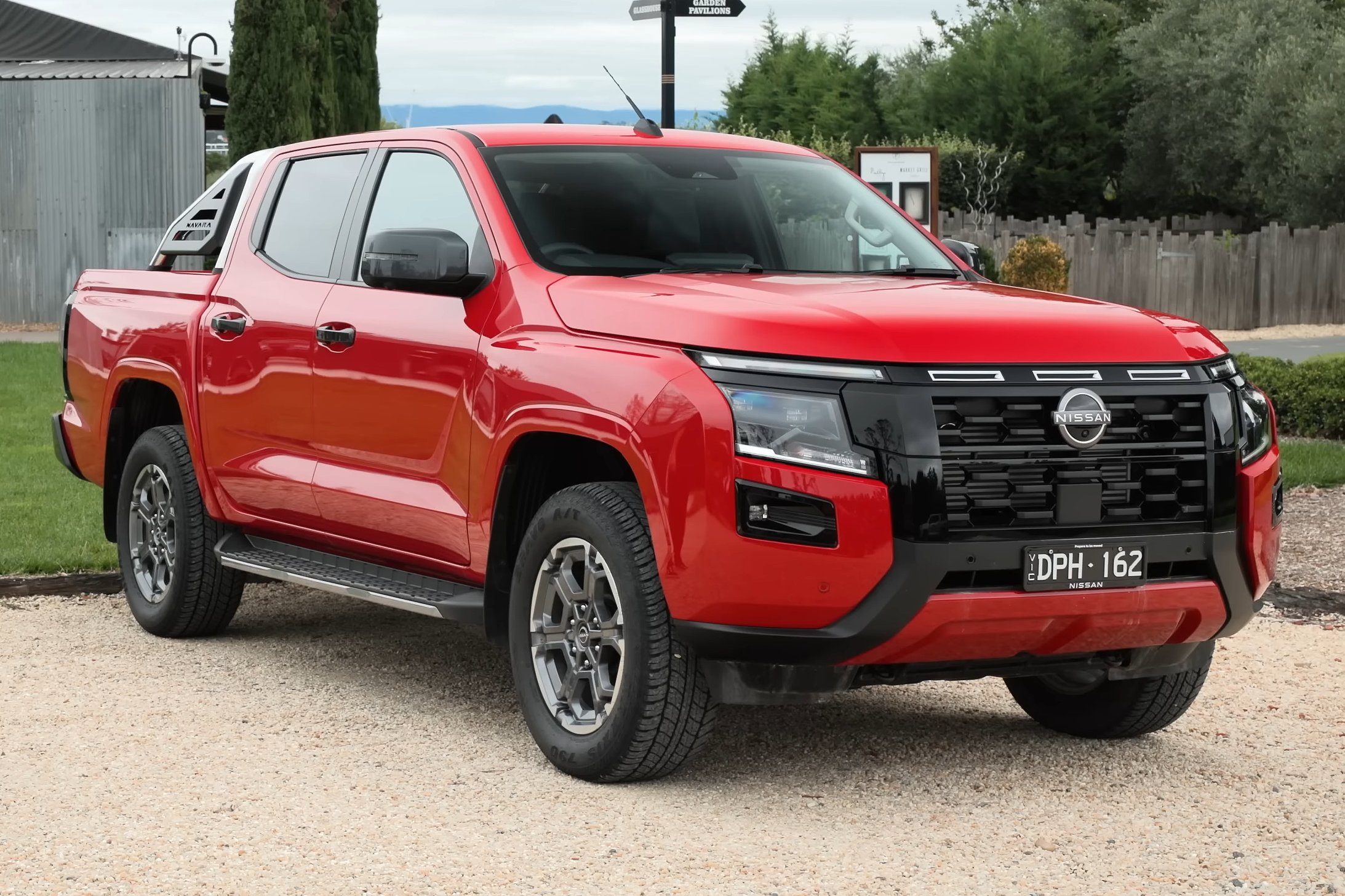
- 2026 Nissan Navara ST-X (Australia)

Overview
- Model code: D27
- Also called: Mitsubishi Triton (sixth generation)
- Production: December 2025 – present
- Assembly: Thailand: Laem Chabang (MMTh)

Body and chassis
- Body style: 4-door pickup
- Related: Mitsubishi Pajero (fifth generation)

Powertrain
- Engine: Diesel: 2.4 L 4N16 twin-turbo I4
- Transmission: 6-speed automatic

Dimensions
- Wheelbase: 3,130 mm (123.2 in)
- Length: 5,320 mm (209.4 in)
- Width: 1,865–1,930 mm (73.4–76.0 in)
- Height: 1,795 mm (70.7 in)

The fourth-generation Navara was unveiled in Australia and New Zealand on 19 November 2025. The D27 Navara was developed from the sixth-generation Mitsubishi Triton, and manufactured by Mitsubishi Motors.

It is powered by Mitsubishi's 4N16 2.4-litre turbo-diesel engine, producing 150 kW (201 hp; 204 PS) and 470 N⋅m (347 lb⋅ft; 47.9 kg⋅m). It is only available with an automatic transmission and four-wheel drive.

Australian market Navara are fitted with locally tuned shock absorbers developed by engineering firm Premcar, which are fitted at dealerships while the original shock absorbers shared with the Mitsubishi Triton are removed and scrapped.

The D27 Navara will reportedly be sold alongside the Navara Pro once the Navara Pro begins sales in Australia in 2027.

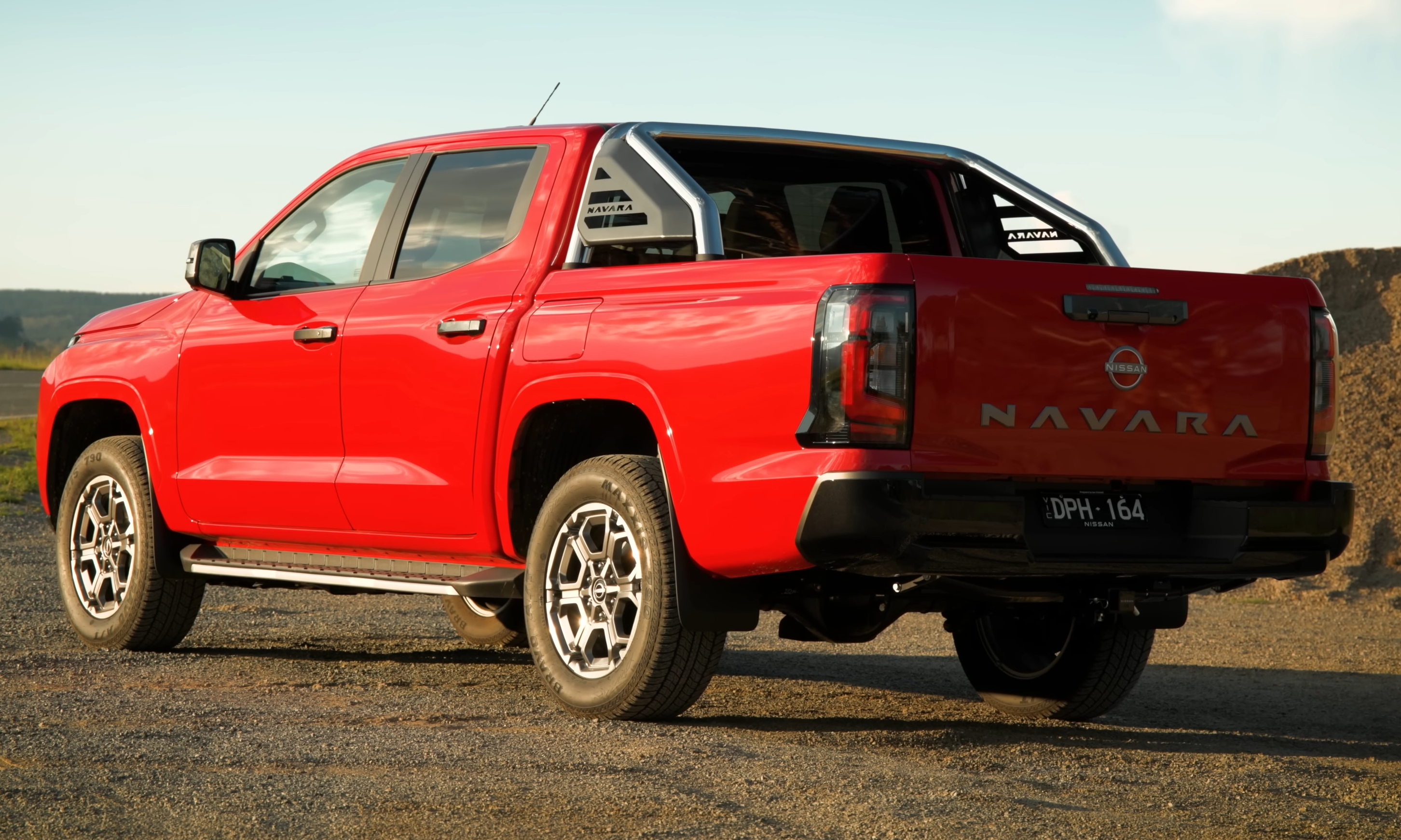
Rear view

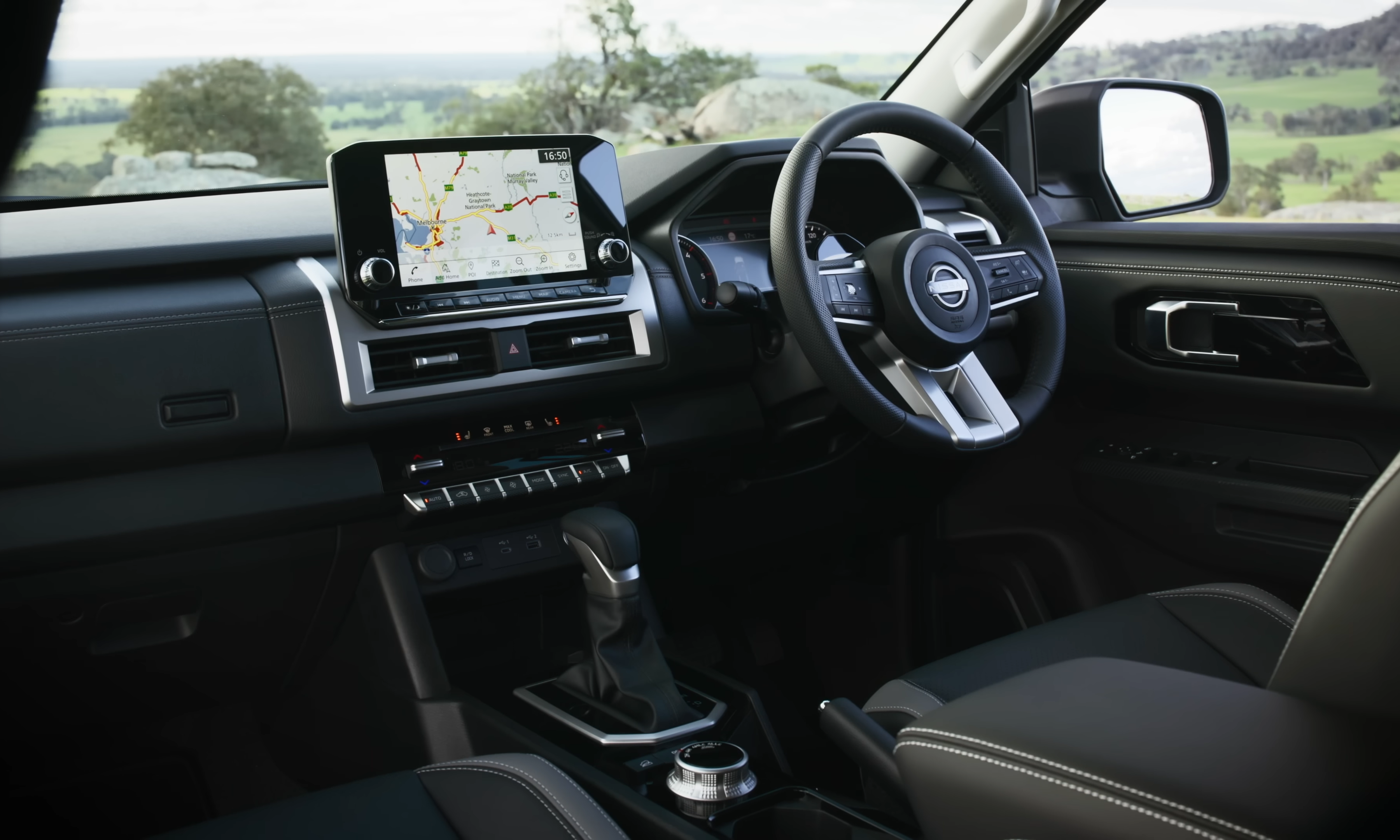
Interior

=== Safety ===
ANCAP test results Nissan Navara all dual cab variants (2024, aligned with Euro NCAP)
| Test | Points | % |
|---|---|---|
| Overall: | 5 /5 stars | |
| Adult occupant: | 34.64 | 86% |
| Child occupant: | 44.03 | 89% |
| Pedestrian: | 47.01 | 74% |
| Safety assist: | 12.75 | 70% |

== Motorsports ==
The D40 Frontier platform is currently being used as a Stage Rally vehicle by the NISMO Stuff Racing effort currently competing in the Coupe Rallye Quebec series. This team has been racing the current D40 Frontier for over two years with eight stage rallies and two hill climbs under its belt having never suffered a mechanical failure of any kind.

Nissan South Africa campaigned both the D22 and D40 platforms very successfully in the local ABSA Off-Road Series, winning eight consecutive driver's championships (2001 to 2008). The vehicles were prepared by Hallspeed South Africa. Hallspeed also developed and sold vehicles to the Belgian-based company Overdrive. For several years Overdrive have competed with the Hallspeed built vehicles in the European rally Raid series, including The Dakar.

== Sales ==
| Calendar year | U.S | Canada | Thailand | Philippines | Mexico | | Argentina | | Brazil | Malaysia (Note: Figures based on registration (Malaysia)) | | Indonesia | | |
| Calendar year | U.S | Canada | Thailand | Philippines | NP300 | Frontier V6 | Frontier | Alaskan | Brazil | Navara | Frontier | Frontier | Navara | NP300 |
|---|---|---|---|---|---|---|---|---|---|---|---|---|---|---|
| 2002 | | | | | | 3,314 | | | | | | 182 | | |
| 2003 | | | | | | 2,558 | | | | | | 204 | | |
| 2004 | | | | | | 1,830 | | | | | 4,429 | 126 | | |
| 2005 | 72,838 | 2,064 | | | | 577 | | | | | 6,526 | 252 | | |
| 2006 | 77,510 | 2,461 | | | | 6,051 | | | | | 3,063 | 146 | | |
| 2007 | 64,397 | 2,162 | | | | 5,188 | | | | | 2,279 | 67 | 152 | |
| 2008 | 44,997 | 1,608 | | | 2,850 | 1,459 | | | | 226 | 1,945 | 0 | 783 | |
| 2009 | 27,415 | 1,649 | | | 20 | 1,032 | | | | 1,233 | 1,272 | | 375 | 61 |
| 2010 | 40,427 | 2,272 | | | 1,015 | 979 | 2,344 | | 8,578 | 3,198 | 712 | | 504 | 417 |
| 2011 | 51,700 | 2,512 | | | 3,400 | 835 | 3,819 | | 13,681 | 3,899 | 637 | | 616 | 78 |
| 2012 | 55,435 | 2,973 | | | 6,144 | 1,293 | 1,391 | | 17,558 | 4,270 | 529 | | 646 | 0 |
| 2013 | 62,837 | 2,964 | | | 5,717 | 1,716 | 1,443 | | 15,596 | 4,181 | 159 | | 605 | 0 |
| 2014 | 74,323 | 3,567 | 15,778 | | 5,795 | 2,700 | 190 | | 11,589 | 3,691 | 2 | | 334 | 0 |
| 2015 | 62,817 | 3,622 | 19,412 | | 58,876 | 1,452 | 56 | | 5,752 | 3,823 | 0 | | 87 | 811 |
| 2016 | 86,926 | 4,127 | 17,762 | | 68,932 | 838 | 1,341 | | 3,606 | 6,047 | | | 9 | 621 |
| 2017 | 74,360 | 4,260 | 20,453 | | 75,324 | 942 | 2,000 | | 4,057 | 5,898 | | | 1 | 679 |
| 2018 | 79,646 | 4,134 | 25,116 | 16,140 | 67,052 | 875 | 2,521 | | 6,323 | 5,731 | | | 789 | |
| 2019 | 72,369 | 3,723 | 25,036 | 19,034 | 62,989 | 850 | 2,750 | | 8,091 | 4,193 | | | 388 | |
| 2020 | 36,845 | 1,355 | 13,523 | 9,164 | 44,577 | 409 | 3,639 | 53 | 8,079 | 2,989 | | | 56 | |
| 2021 | 60,693 | 1,716 | 8,079 | 9,882 | 47,884 | 717 | 5,722 | 3,920 | 11,824 | 2,860 | | | | |
| 2022 | 76,185 (Note: Includes sales of the D41 Nissan Frontier (not based on the Navara)) | 5,075 | 5,314 | 11,281 | 40,427 | 1,397 | 7,516 | 4,392 | 8,656 | 4,388 | | | | |
| 2023 | 58,134 | 3,343 | 3,470 | | 61,878 | 1,178 | 12,714 | 3,707 | 8,391 | 2,365 | | | | |
| 2024 | 69,813 | 2,641 | 2,478 | 10,297 | 59,031 | 1,387 | 6,758 | | 9,264 | 1,624 | | | | |
| 2025 | 65,232 | 1,668 | | | 58,422 | 1,317 | | | 5,092 | 645 | | | | |
