= Reliance =

Reliance may refer to:

== Companies ==
- Reliance (bus company), a bus operator in North Yorkshire, England
- Reliance Controls, an American electrical products company founded in 1909 in Wisconsin
- Reliance Home Comfort, a Canadian water heater rental and HVAC service company
- Reliance Industries, an Indian conglomerate holding headed by Mukesh Ambani:
  - Reliance Digital
  - Reliance Jio
  - Reliance Fresh
  - Reliance Industrial Infrastructure
  - Reliance Institute of Life Sciences
  - Reliance Logistics
  - Reliance Petroleum
  - Reliance Retail, retail business wing
  - Reliance Solar
- Reliance Anil Dhirubhai Ambani Group, another Indian conglomerate headed by Anil Ambani:
  - Reliance Capital
  - Reliance Communications
  - Reliance Entertainment
  - Reliance Health
  - Reliance Infrastructure, private power utility and construction
  - Reliance MediaWorks
  - Reliance Power
- Reliance Insurance Company, founded in Philadelphia in 1817
- Reliance Computer Corporation, former name of ServerWorks, a fabless semiconductor company
- Reliance, Inc., the largest metals service center operator in North America
- Reliance Insurance Limited, the largest non-life insurance company in Bangladesh

== Places ==
=== United States ===
- Reliance, Delaware and Maryland
- Reliance, South Dakota
- Reliance, Tennessee
- Reliance, Wyoming

== Transport craft ==
- Reliance (automobile), produced from 1903 to 1907
- Reliance (L 6), a World War II US Navy Goodyear L class blimp
- Reliance (skipjack), a Chesapeake Bay skipjack built in 1904
- Reliance (yacht), America's Cup race winner in 1903
- Reliance (1815 ship), a merchant ship built at Coringa, British India that became a whaler and wrecked in 1836
- USCGC Reliance (WMEC-615), a United States Coast Guard cutter
- HMS Reliance, name of multiple British ships of the Royal Navy

== Other uses ==
- Reliance (horse), a Thoroughbred racehorse
- Detrimental reliance, another name for the legal concept of estoppel

== See also ==
- Reliant (disambiguation)
