= Shyamaprasad Mukherjee =

Indian mathematician and statistician

S. P. Mukherjee
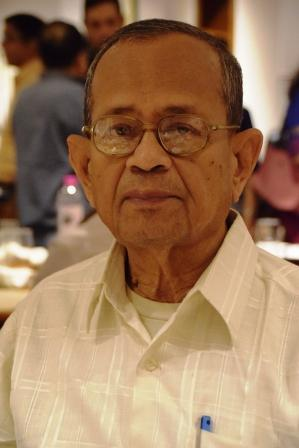
- Prof S P Mukherjee at a felicitation event in Feb 2016
- Born: 16 June 1938 (age 88); Kidderpore, Kolkata, India
- Education: Presidency College, Calcutta; University of Calcutta
- Known for: Reliability analysis
- Awards: Prof P. V. Sukhatme Award for Senior Statisticians; P. C. Mahalanobis Birth Centenary Award
- Scientific career
- Fields: Statistics
- Workplaces: University of Calcutta
- Doctoral advisor: Purnendu Kumar Bose

Shyamaprasad Mukherjee, FNASc, known as S. P. Mukherjee (born 16 June 1938), is an Indian statistician and the former Centenary Professor of Statistics at the University of Calcutta. He is a visiting professor at University of Calcutta after retiring formally in 2004. He is the Chairman of Expert Group conducting All-India surveys under the Labour Bureau.

== Early life and education ==
He was born in Kidderpore, Kolkata, India. In 1954 he appeared in his school final (10th grade) examination and was ranked second in the state of West Bengal. He received an M.Sc. in Statistics in 1960 and Ph.D. in Statistics in 1967 from University of Calcutta. After a short stint of teaching in the Presidency College, Calcutta, he joined the University of Calcutta as a lecturer in Statistics in 1964.

== Academic career ==
Prof Mukherjee has done extensive research work in Applied Probability, Parametric and Bayesian Estimation, Reliability Analysis, Quality Management, and Operations Research; published more than sixty research papers and review and expository articles; and supervised twenty one Ph. D. students. He was the President of the Operational Research Society of India as well as of the Association of Asian-Pacific Operational Research Societies (APORS). He was also a Vice-President of the International Federation of Operational Research Societies (IFORS). He has been the President of the Calcutta Statistical Association. He was the Chairman of the Committee on Statistical Methods for Quality and Reliability of the Bureau of Indian Standards. He is the president of the Indian Association for Productivity, Quality and Reliability (IAPQR) as well as the editor of IAPQR Transactions and is associated with the editorial work of several other journals.

=== Areas of research contributions ===
- Applied probability
- Parametric and Bayesian estimation
- Reliability
- Quality management
- Operations research

=== Books authored ===
- Graduate Employment and Higher Education in West Bengal
- Frontiers in Probability and Statistics
- Quality: Domains and Dimensions
- Statistical Methods in Social Science Research
- A Guide to Research Methodology: An Overview of Research Problems, Tasks and Methods
- Decision-making: Concepts, Methods and Techniques

=== Awards and medals ===
- Prof P V Sukhatme Award for Senior Statisticians June 2012
- P C Mahalanobis Birth Centenary Award January 2000
- Fellow of ISPS 2012
