= Reliability =

Reliability, reliable, or unreliable may refer to:

== Science, technology, and mathematics ==
=== Computing ===
- Data reliability (disambiguation), a property of some disk arrays in computer storage
- Reliability (computer networking), a category used to describe protocols
- Reliability (semiconductor), outline of semiconductor device reliability drivers

=== Other uses in science, technology, and mathematics ===
- Reliability (statistics), the overall consistency of a measure
- Reliability engineering, concerned with the ability of a system or component to perform its required functions under stated conditions for a specified time
  - Human reliability in engineered systems
- Reliability theory, as a theoretical concept, to explain biological aging and species longevity

== Other uses ==
- Reliabilism, in philosophy and epistemology
- Unreliable narrator, whose credibility has been seriously compromised

== See also ==
- Reliant (disambiguation)
