= Chevrolet AK Series =

American truck series

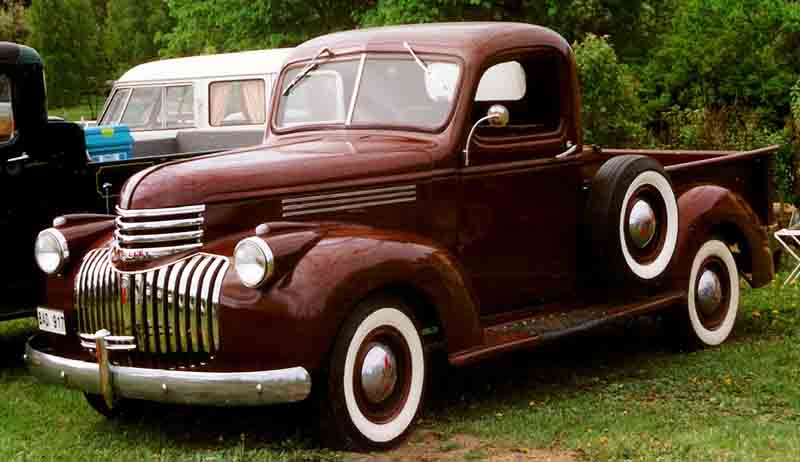
- 1946 Chevrolet AK series truck

Overview
- Manufacturer: Chevrolet (General Motors)
- Model years: 1941–1947
- Assembly: United States: Baltimore Assembly (Maryland); Flint Truck Assembly (Michigan); Janesville Assembly (Wisconsin); Lakewood Assembly (Georgia); Leeds Assembly (Missouri); Norwood Assembly (Ohio); Oakland Assembly (California); Pontiac West Assembly (Michigan); St. Louis Truck Assembly (Missouri); North Tarrytown Assembly (New York); Canada: Oshawa Truck Assembly (Ontario); Argentina: Buenos Aires (GM Argentina); Denmark: Copenhagen (GM Copenhagen)

Body and chassis
- Body style: 2-door pickup truck 3-door panel truck 2-door Cab Over Engine; 2-door station wagon (Suburban); 2-door Coupé utility
- Layout: FR layout

Powertrain
- Engine: 216 cu in (3.5 L) Chevrolet I6; 228 cu in (3.7 L) GMC I6
- Transmission: 3-speed manual

Chronology
- Predecessor: Chevrolet Master trucks
- Successor: Chevrolet Advance Design

The Chevrolet AK Series is a range of pickup trucks sold under the Chevrolet brand, produced from 1941 through 1947. It used the GM A platform, shared with the Chevrolet Deluxe. The AK series was also branded and sold at GMC locations, with the primary visual difference being the Chevrolet had vertical bars in the grille, while the GMC had horizontal bars. The 1941–45 GMC models were sold as the C-Series and became E-Series for the 1946 and 1947 model years (CC-Series/EC-Series for the conventional cab models and CF-Series/EF-Series for the COE ones).

The AK series represented an appearance split from previous Chevrolet products where the passenger cars and pickup trucks shared a common appearance, as demonstrated in the Chevrolet Master truck. The Chevrolet Deluxe was an all-new appearance when it was introduced in 1941, and shared much of its mechanicals with the AK series truck and second generation Chevrolet Suburban.

It was replaced with the Advance-Design, that was also sold as a GMC.

== Gallery ==
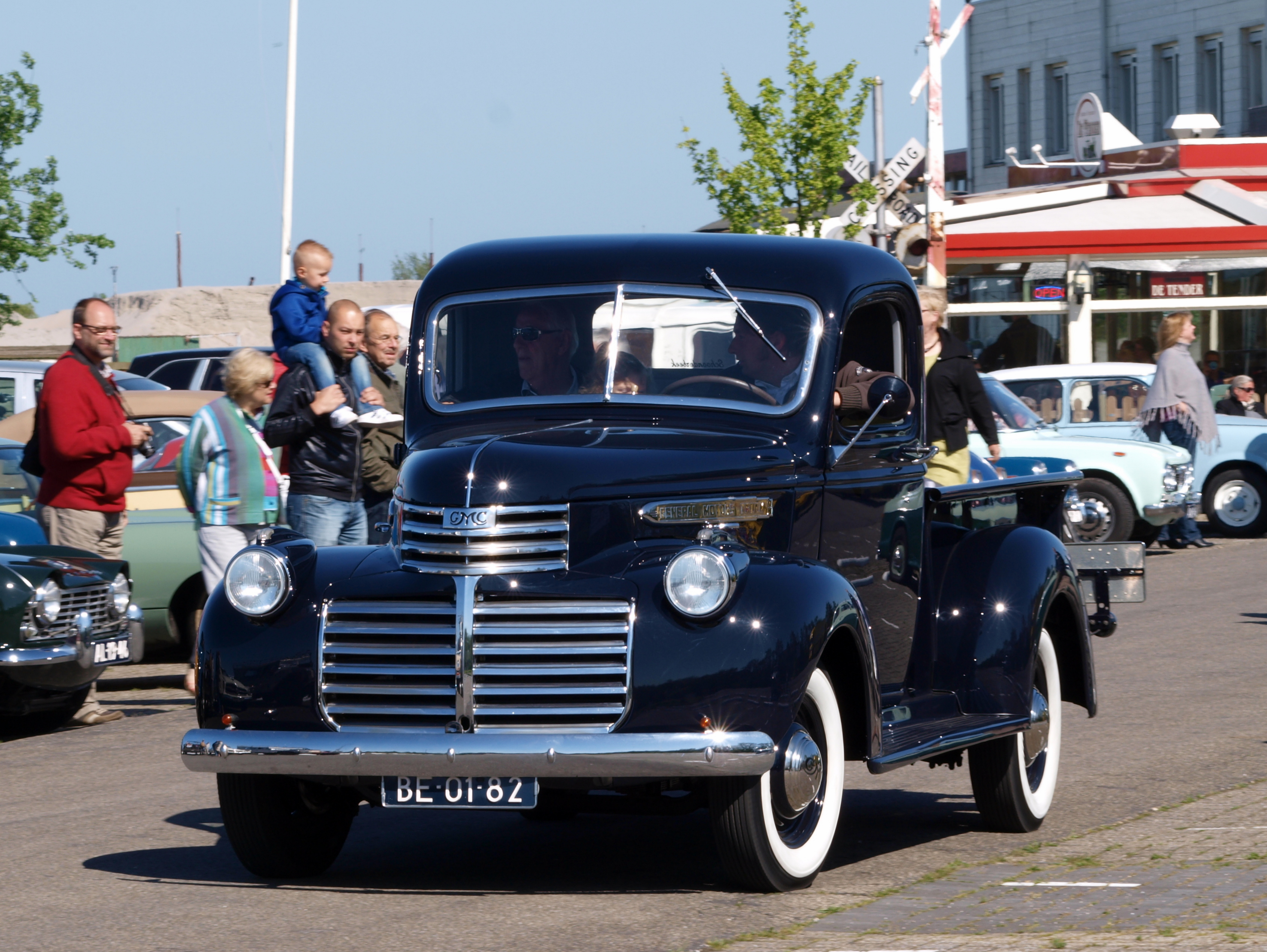
1941 GMC CC-series truck

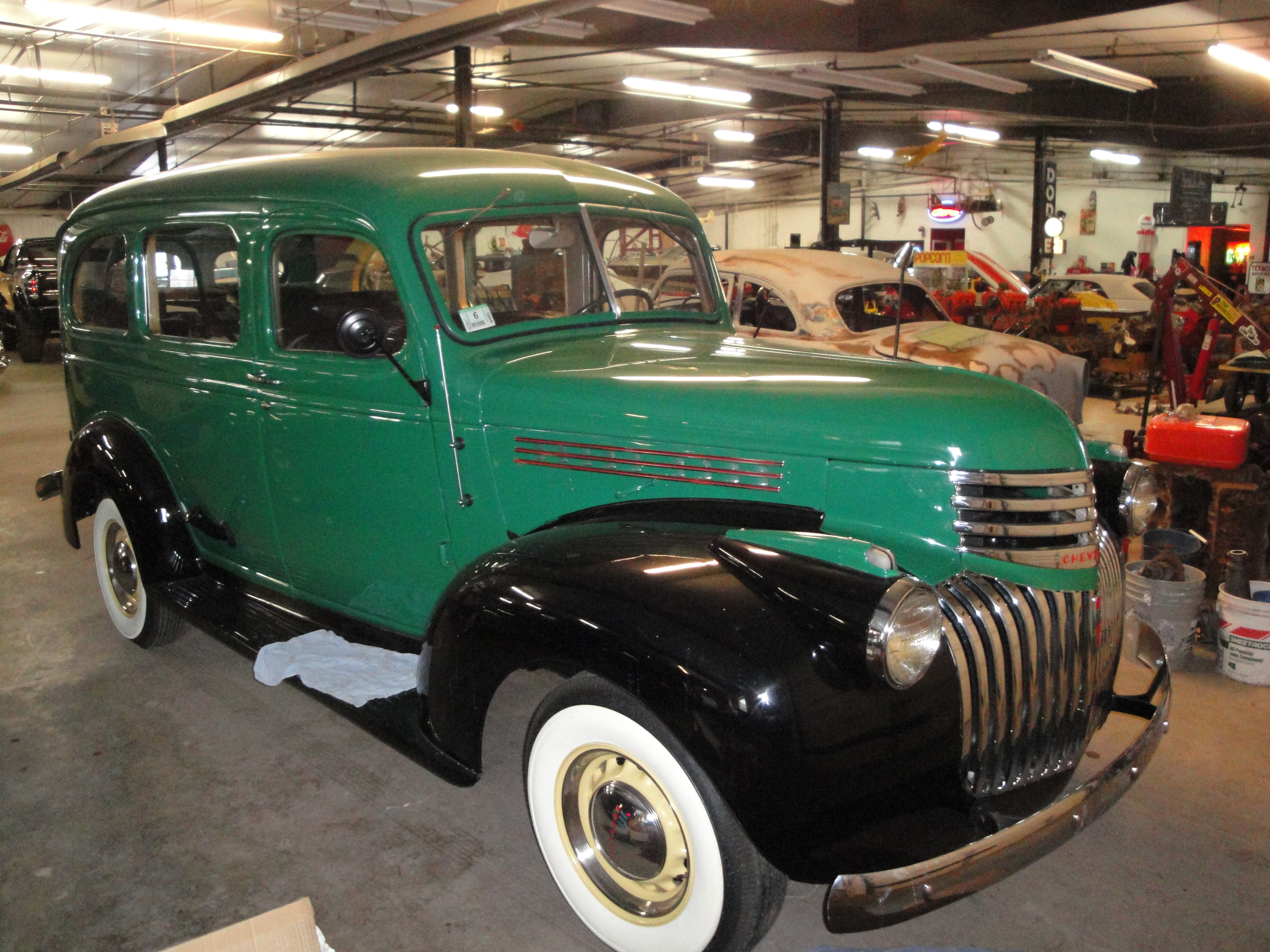
AK series Chevrolet Suburban

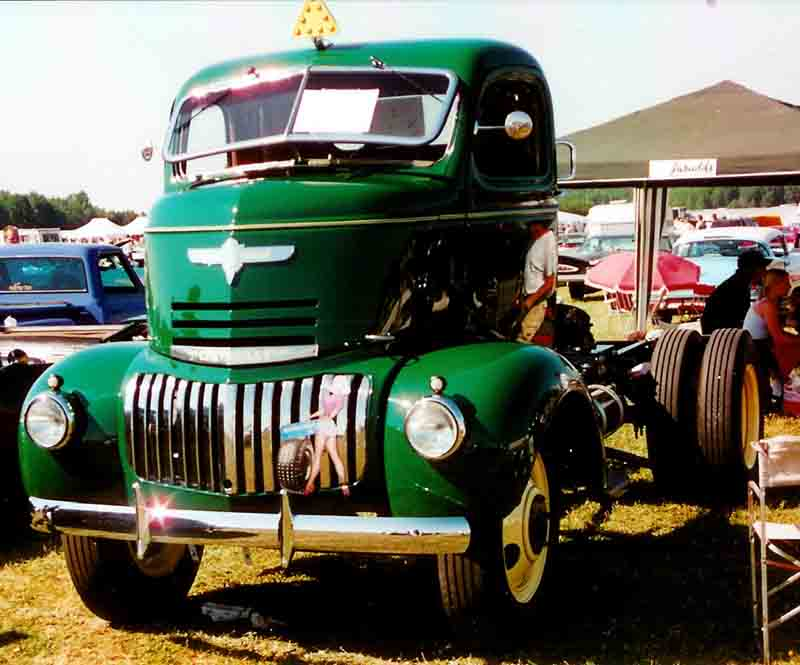
1942 Chevrolet AK series Cab Over Engine truck

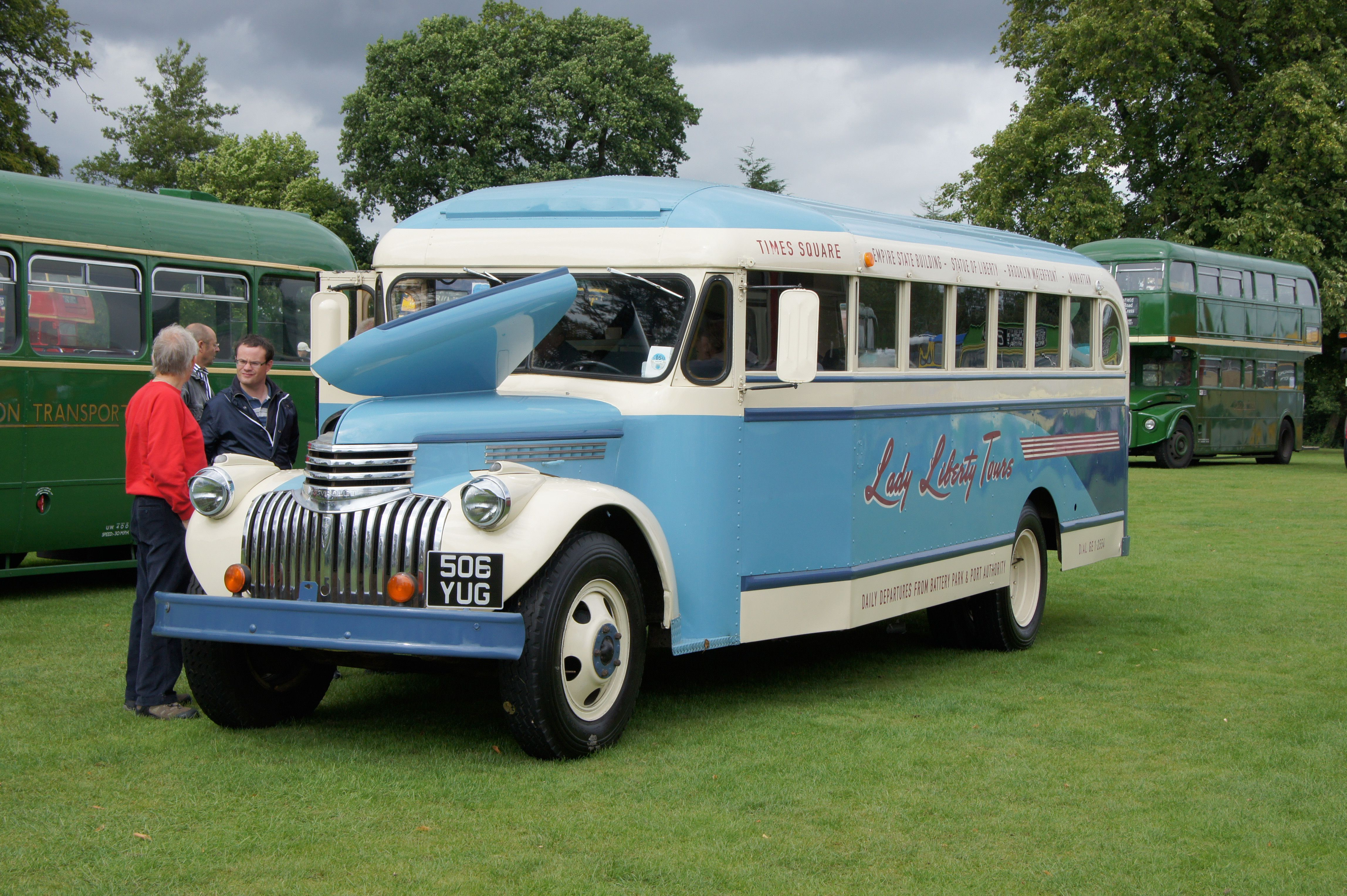
Chevrolet AK series bus

== See also ==
- Dodge T-, V-, W-Series, a contemporaneous American truck series also with Art Deco/Streamline Moderne styling
