= Pontiac West Assembly =

Pontiac West
- Operated: 1909–2008
- Location: Baldwin Avenue; Pontiac, Michigan
- Coordinates: 42.62°N 83.29°W
- Industry: Automotive
- Products: Chevrolet and GMC trucks
- Owner: General Motors
- Defunct: 2008; 18 years ago

Pontiac West Assembly (also known as GMC Truck & Coach, GM Truck Validation Center and Pontiac Centerpoint Campus Validation Center) was a General Motors manufacturing facility located in Pontiac, Michigan. The manufacturing complex occupied an irregular 82-acre site bounded on the North side by Rapid Street, on the South side by South Boulevard W, on the East side by the Grand Trunk Western Railroad/Woodward Avenue (U.S. Route 24), and on the West side by Franklin Road. The complex included GMC Truck & Coach Plant 1, 3, 4 and 5, as well as numerous administrative and support buildings. The last GM operations at the facility were closed, and the site completely demolished, in 2008.

== History ==
The complex was originally many separate privately owned parcels belonging to various manufacturing companies as well as private homes. By 1909 Rapid Motor Vehicle Company occupied a plant at 25 Rapid Street abutting the Grand Trunk Western Railroad tracks.

By 1919, Wilson Foundry & Machine Company, Detroit Weather Proof Body Company and Pontiac Drop Forge Company were some of the diverse property owners.

General Motors ownership of the site began with its acquisition of Rapid Motor Vehicle Company and its plant at 25 Rapid Street in 1909. The Rapid Motor Vehicle facility became Plant 1. In 1913, the manufacturing of all GMC trucks was consolidated at the Rapid Street plant.

GM acquired a controlling interest in Yellow Truck & Coach Manufacturing Company in 1925 and began moving its engineering operations to the Rapid Street plant. In 1937, Yellow Truck & Coach Manufacturing Company began purchasing the plants owned by Wilson Foundry & Machine Company. Plant 4 fronted S Saginaw Street (now Woodward Avenue). Plant 3 on the corner of South Boulevard W and Franklin Road was acquired in 1940. Plant 5 fronted Franklin Road north of Plant 3. In 1943, GM acquired the remaining interest in Yellow Truck & Coach Manufacturing Company and renamed it GMC Truck & Coach Division.

Around 1981, Plant 1 was demolished. Plants 3 and 5 were demolished around 2005, and Plant 4 in 2008. In 2011 the vacant property was transferred to RACER Trust as part of the GM bankruptcy settlement, and sold to M1 Concourse in 2014 and developed into a playground for auto enthusiasts.

== Other associated GMC facilities ==
- Plant 2 opened in 1928 at 660 South Boulevard E; this larger facility became known as Pontiac Central Assembly
- Plant 6 opened in 1972 at 2100 South Opdyke Road; this modern facility became known as Pontiac East Assembly

== Vehicles built ==
- Chevrolet AK Series/GMC C and E series
- Chevrolet Advance Design/GMC New Design
- Chevrolet Task Force/GMC Blue Chip
- Chevrolet C/K/GMC C/K/GMC Sierra
- GMC Motorhome
- GM Scenicruiser Bus
- GM Buffalo bus
- GM "old-look" transit bus
- GM New Look bus
- Chevrolet S-10Chevrolet/GMC S/T series
