= GMC (automobile) =

American utility vehicle brand

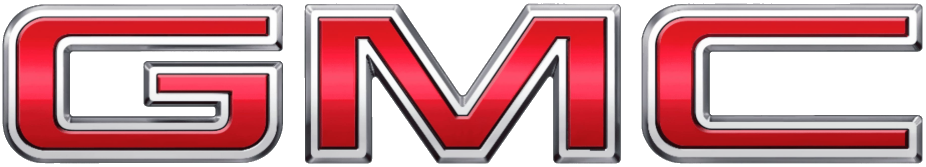

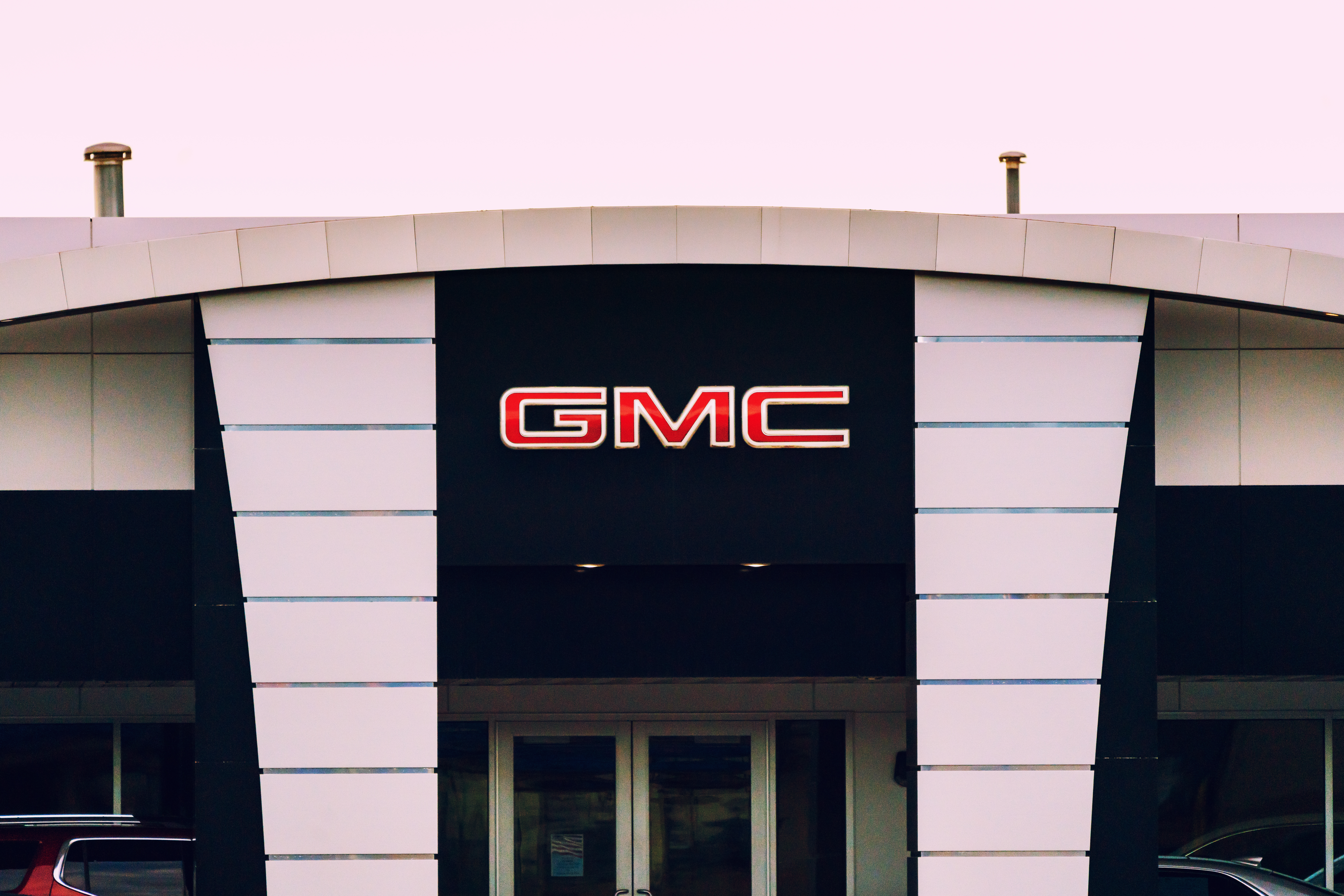
- GMC dealership sign in South Dakota
- Formerly: General Motors Truck Company (1911–1943); GMC Truck & Coach Division (1943–1998)
- Type: Division
- Industry: Automotive
- Predecessors: Rapid Motor Vehicle Company; Reliance Motor Car Company
- Founded: 1911; 115 years ago
- Founder: William C. Durant
- Headquarters: Detroit, Michigan, U.S.
- Area served: North America; South Korea; Middle East; Australasia
- Key people: Michael Mcphee (vice president)
- Products: Automobiles; Commercial vehicles; Trucks
- Brands: Denali; Hummer
- Parent: General Motors
- Website: gmc.com

GMC is a division of American automotive manufacturer General Motors (GM) for trucks and utility vehicles. GMC currently makes SUVs, pickup trucks, vans, and light-duty trucks. In the past, GMC also produced police vehicles, fire trucks, ambulances, heavy-duty trucks, military vehicles, motorhomes, transit buses, and medium duty trucks.

GM positions GMC as a premium vehicle brand in its portfolio, above the mainstream Chevrolet brand and below the luxury Cadillac division, although many vehicles share underlying platforms. In North America, GMC vehicles are typically sold alongside Buick vehicles, another premium marque, at multi-brand dealerships. The former GM division Hummer was revived as a sub-brand of GMC in 2020.

== History ==
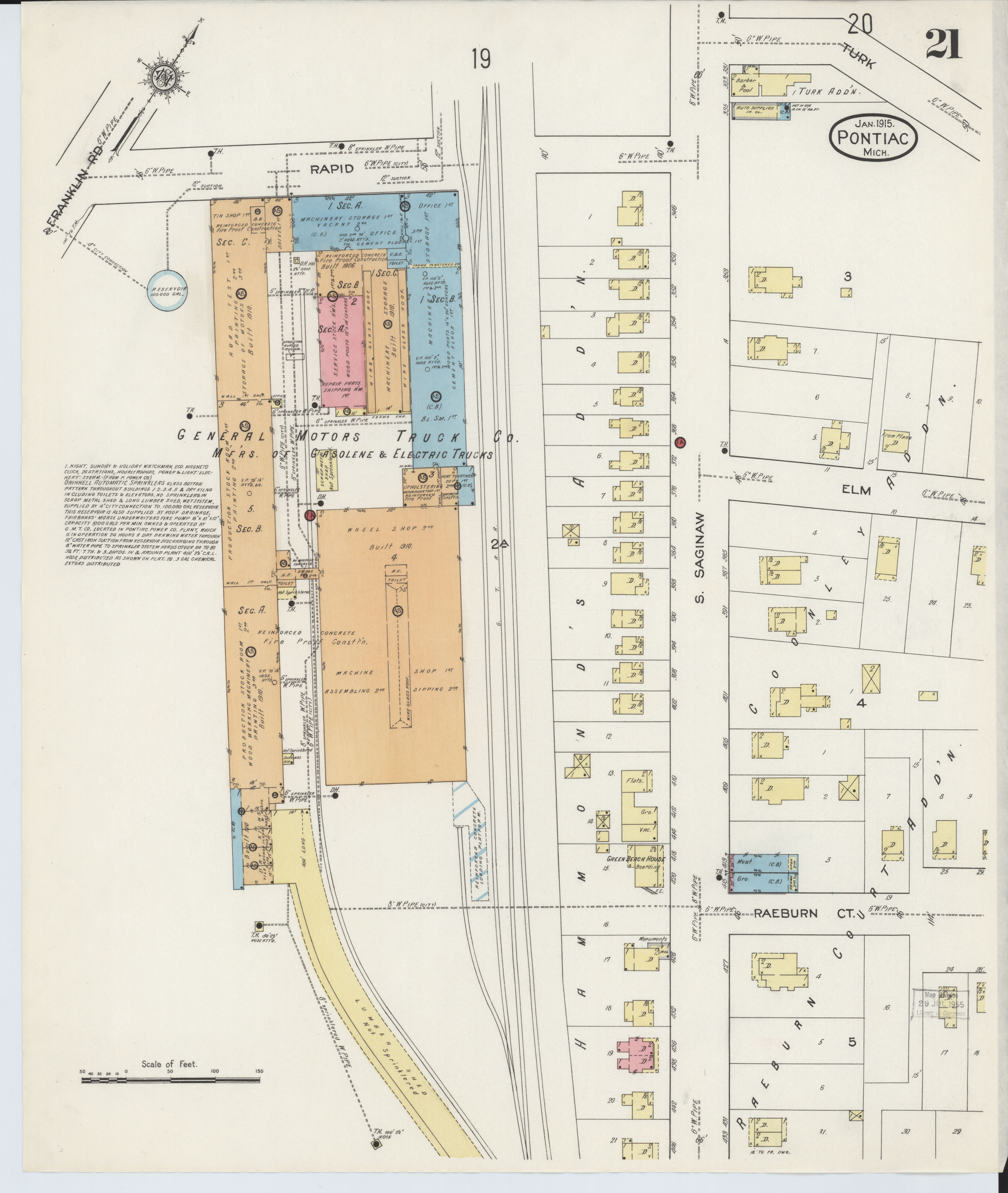
GMC Oakland plant (1915)

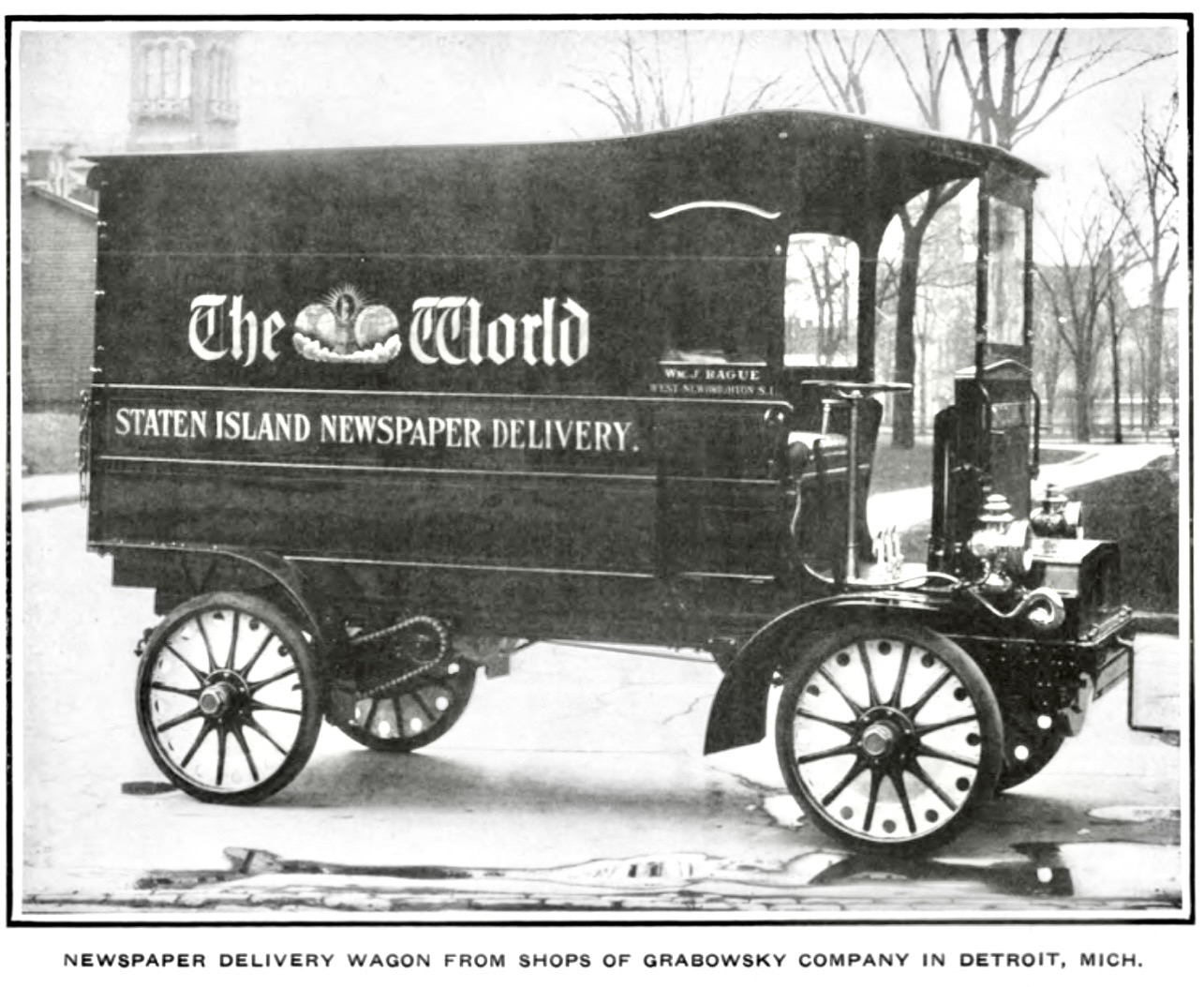
Grabowsky Delivery Truck 1,5 to (1908-1913)

Grabowsky advertisement (1910)

Roots to the GMC brand can be traced to 1900, when the Grabowsky Motor Company was established by brothers Max (1874-1946) and Morris Grabowsky, in Detroit, and renamed Rapid Motor Vehicle Company in 1902, when the brothers moved operations to Pontiac, Michigan. In 1909, William C. Durant gained control of Rapid Motor Vehicle Company and made it a subsidiary of his General Motors Company. In 1909, 300 vehicles were produced by Grabowsky.

In 1911, General Motors formed the General Motors Truck Company, and folded Rapid and Reliance Motor Car Company (another early commercial vehicle manufacturer that Durant had acquired in 1908) into it. In 1912, the Rapid and Reliance names were dropped in favor of "GMC". All General Motors truck production was consolidated at the former Rapid Motor Plant 1 in Pontiac, Michigan. In 1913, Horner took over the Grabowsky factory.

GMC maintained three manufacturing locations in Pontiac, Michigan, Oakland, California, and St. Louis, Missouri.

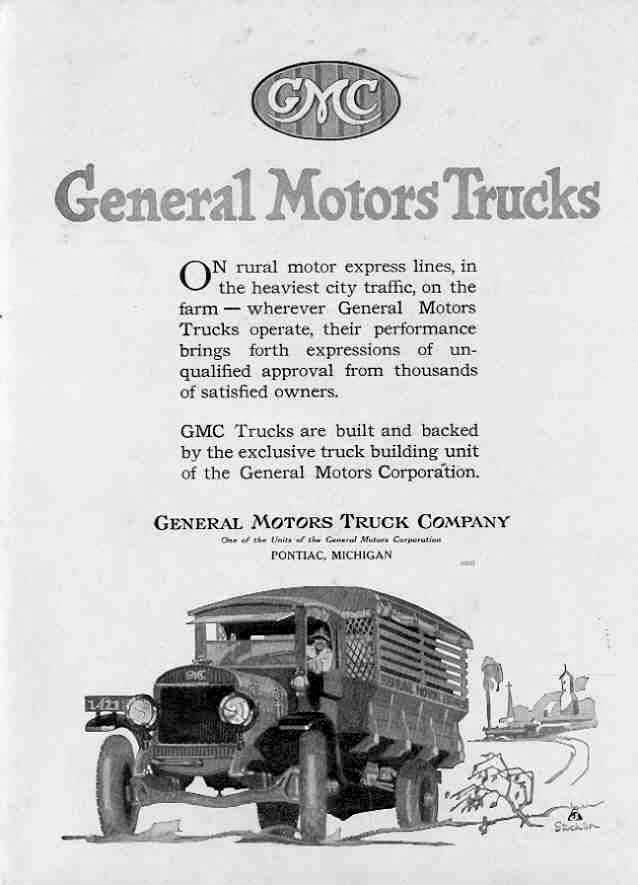
1920 GMC advertisement

In 1916, a GMC truck crossed the country from Seattle to New York City in thirty days. In 1926, a two-ton GMC truck was driven from New York to San Francisco in five days and 30 minutes. During World War I, the company provided the Model 16 3/4-ton truck, and modified its production to provide one-ton troop carriers and aviation support vehicles. By 1918, more than 90 percent of GMC truck production was for military use. GMTC provided a total of 8,512 trucks to the U.S. government during the war years, and earned a Distinguished Service Award. During World War II, GMC Truck produced 600,000 trucks for use by the United States Armed Forces.

In 1923, GMC trucks were exported to Japan to help recovery and reconstruction as a result of the Great Kantō earthquake; the company continued to provide vehicles as the transportation infrastructure was rebuilt. Before the earthquake struck, most of Japan's transportation of commerce and people was by wooden carts and government-owned railroads, which were severely damaged when the train tracks were twisted beyond use. Autonomous trucks were much more effective at traveling to heavily damaged areas.

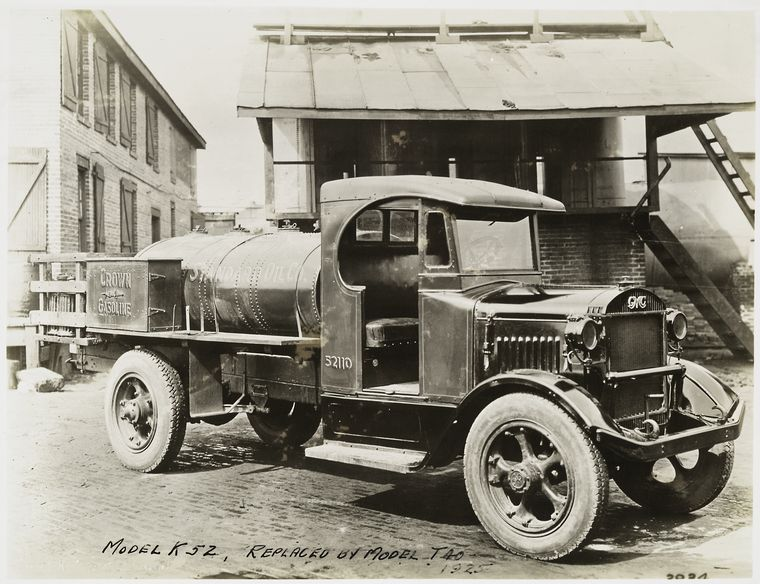
A "Crown Gasoline" (Crown Central Petroleum)'s General Motors truck Model K52 in 1925

In 1925, GM purchased a controlling interest in Yellow Coach, a bus and taxicab manufacturer based in Chicago, Illinois, which was founded by John D. Hertz. The company was renamed Yellow Truck & Coach Manufacturing Company (YT&CMC), an affiliated subsidiary of General Motors. All manufacturing operations of General Motors Truck Company were placed under YT&CMC. In 1928, Plant 2 opened and all headquarters staff moved to the administration building at 660 South Boulevard E in Pontiac, Michigan. In 1943, GM purchased the remaining interest in YT&CMC and renamed it GMC Truck and Coach Division.

In 1981, GMC Truck & Coach Division became part of GM Worldwide Truck & Bus Group. Bus production ended in May 1987, and the division name was changed from GMC Truck & Coach to GMC Truck Division. The Canadian plant (in London, Ontario) produced buses from 1962 until July 1987. GM withdrew from the bus and coach market due to increased competition in the late 1970s and 1980s. Rights to the RTS model were sold to Transportation Manufacturing Corporation, while Motor Coach Industries of Canada purchased the Classic design. In 1998, GMC's official branding on vehicles was shortened from GMC Truck to simply GMC.

In 1996, GM merged GMC Truck Division with the Pontiac Motor Division in order to "give the combined division a brand image projecting physical power and outdoor activity". This coincided with many GMC dealerships merging with Pontiac dealerships, allowing a single dealer to offer both trucks and entry-to-mid-level cars, using a similar approach already in use by Chevrolet.

In 2002, GMC celebrated its 100th anniversary, and released a book entitled GMC: The First 100 Years, a complete history of the company.

In 2007, GMC introduced the Acadia, a crossover SUV, which was the division's second unibody vehicle (after the Vandura) whose predecessor, the GMT-360 based Envoy, was discontinued with the closure of GM's Moraine Assembly plant on December 23, 2008.

In 2009, GMC ended production of medium-duty commercial trucks after more than 100 years. They became exclusive to Chevrolet with the launch of the 4500HD/5500HD Silverado in 2018. Also in 2009, GMC introduced the Terrain, a mid-size crossover SUV based on the GM Theta platform shared with the Chevrolet Equinox. It replaced the Pontiac Torrent after the Pontiac brand's demise.

In 2020, General Motors announced the return of the Hummer nameplate, this time as a sub-brand of GMC instead of a stand-alone division. The Hummer lineup includes two models, an electric pickup truck and SUV, to be sold as the "GMC Hummer EV". According to GM, the Edition 1 production electric pickup truck will feature 1,000 horsepower, hit 60 mph in three seconds, and is scheduled to launch in late 2021. The new Hummer EV was revealed on October 20, 2020.

In 2022, the GMC brand was introduced in South Korea as a subsidiary of GM Korea.

In 2025, the GMC brand was introduced in China, Australia, and New Zealand. In May 2025, GM stopped the import and sales of GMC vehicles in China.

== Leadership ==
- Susan Docherty (2009)
- Brian K. Sweeney (2009–2014)
- Duncan Aldred (2014–2024)
- Jaclyn McQuaid (2024–2026)
- Michael Mcphee (2026–present)

== Platform sharing with Chevrolet ==
Beginning in 1920, GMC and Chevrolet trucks became largely similar, built as variants of the same platform, sharing much the same body sheetwork, except for nameplates and grilles – though their differences, especially engines, have varied over the years. GMC advertising marketed its trucks to commercial buyers and businesses, whereas Chevrolet's advertising was directed towards private owners. Beginning in 1928, GMCs used Pontiac's 186 cu in six-cylinder engines in their lighter trucks. Medium-duty trucks relied on Oldsmobile straight-6 engines, while the heaviest trucks used GMC's own "Standard Big Brute" engine. From 1939 to 1974, GMC had its own line of six-cylinder engines, first the inline sixes known as "Jimmy's" from 1939 to 1959, and then their own V6 from 1960 until 1974, of which a V8 and a V12 version also existed. Additionally, from 1955 through 1959, the less than 2-ton, domestic GMC gasoline trucks were equipped with Pontiac V8s, and Oldsmobile V8s—whereas the Canadian models used Chevrolet engines. GMC dealerships were partnered with Pontiac, Oldsmobile and Buick dealerships.

Between 1962 and 1972, most GMC vehicles were equipped with quad-headlights, while their Chevrolet clones were equipped with dual-headlights. The platform has been the most profitable for General Motors, as it was shared with the Chevrolet Blazer/GMC Jimmy, the Chevrolet Suburban and the Chevrolet Tahoe/GMC Denali. In 1998, the platform was introduced as the Cadillac Escalade.

In 1971, GMC marketed their version of the Chevrolet El Camino, which was based on the Chevrolet Chevelle. Called Sprint, it was virtually identical to the El Camino, and a sport version, the SP, was equivalent to the El Camino SS. It was renamed Caballero in 1978, and remained produced alongside the El Camino until its demise in 1987.

In 1973, with GM's introduction of the new "rounded line" series trucks, GMC and Chevrolet trucks became even more similar, ending production of GMC's quad-headlight models, and setting the standard for the Chevrolet/GMC line of trucks for over thirty years.

As of 2020, GMC's vehicles were marketed as more premium, luxury vehicles positioned above similar vehicles from the more mainstream Chevrolet division. Chevrolet vehicles are priced lower than a comparable GMC, but GMC vehicles have features not found in a comparable Chevrolet.

In North America, Chevrolet offers a full lineup of cars, crossover vehicles, sport utility vehicles, and pickup trucks. GMC, however, does not offer any car models, so typically they are sold along Buick (or sometimes Cadillac) vehicles at multi-brand dealerships, allowing the same dealer to sell a full lineup of upscale vehicles, including both cars and trucks. However some standalone GMC dealerships do exist, primarily for dealers who have a focus on selling to the commercial and fleet vehicle markets.

=== Other platform sharing ===
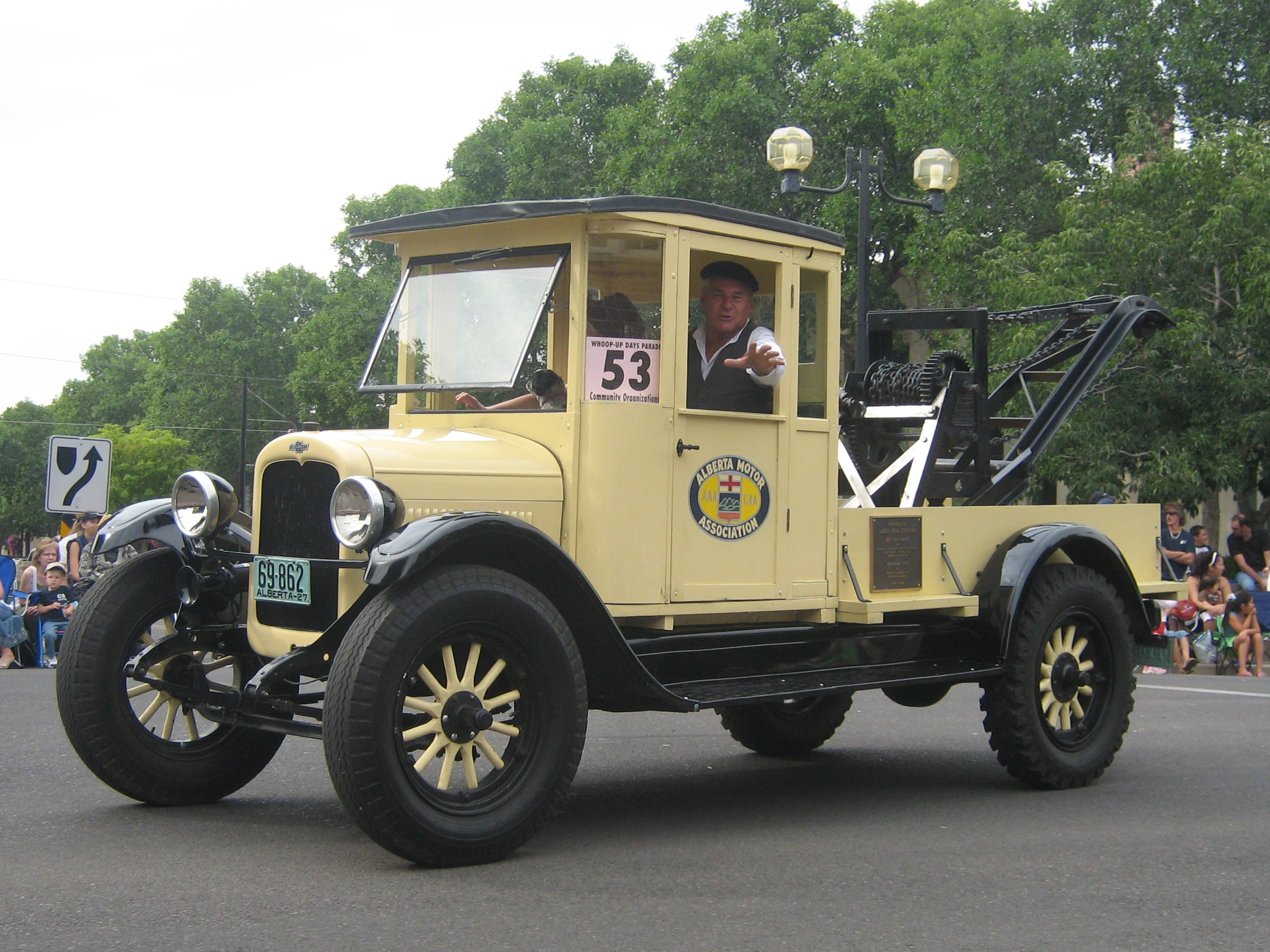
1920 Chevrolet tow truck

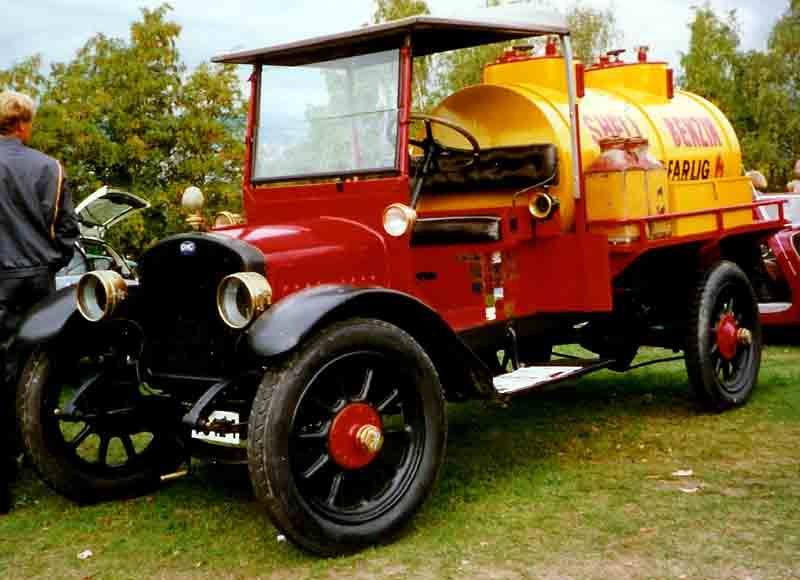
1919 GMC Tanker

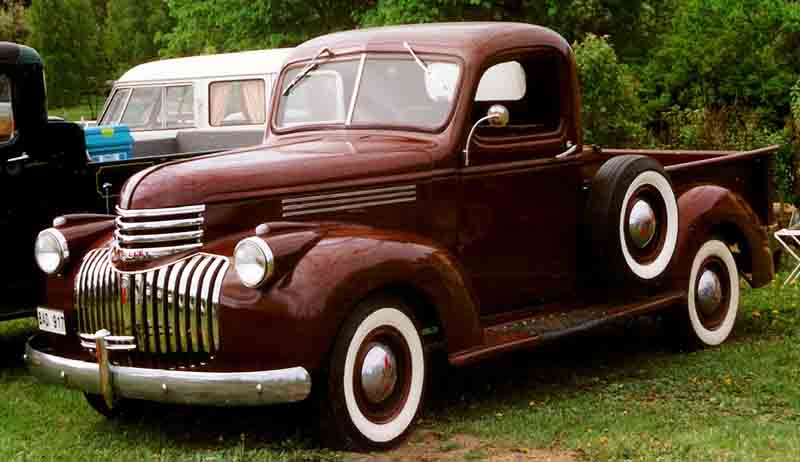
1946 Chevrolet Pickup

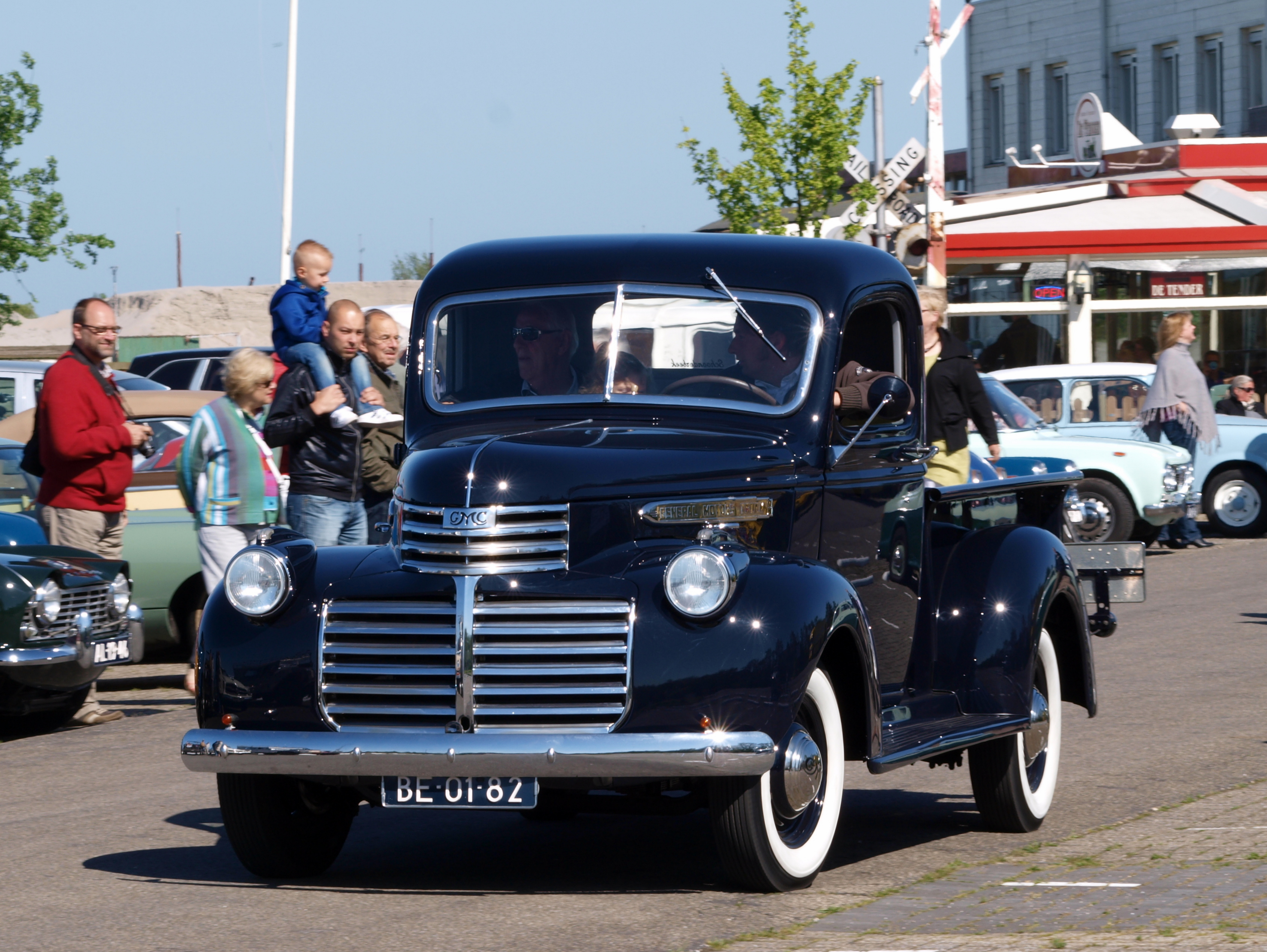
1941 GMC Model 9314

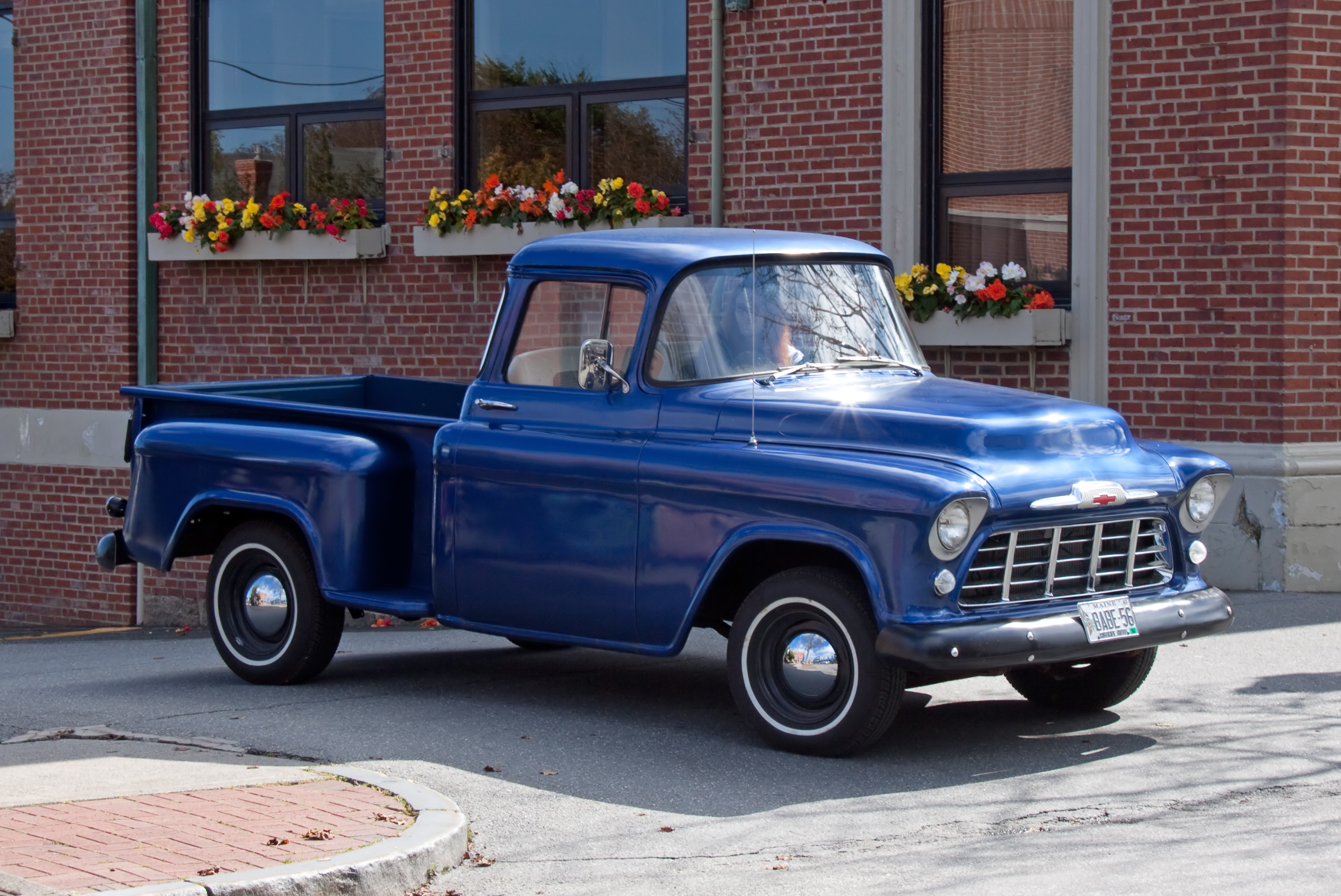
1956 Chevrolet Task Force

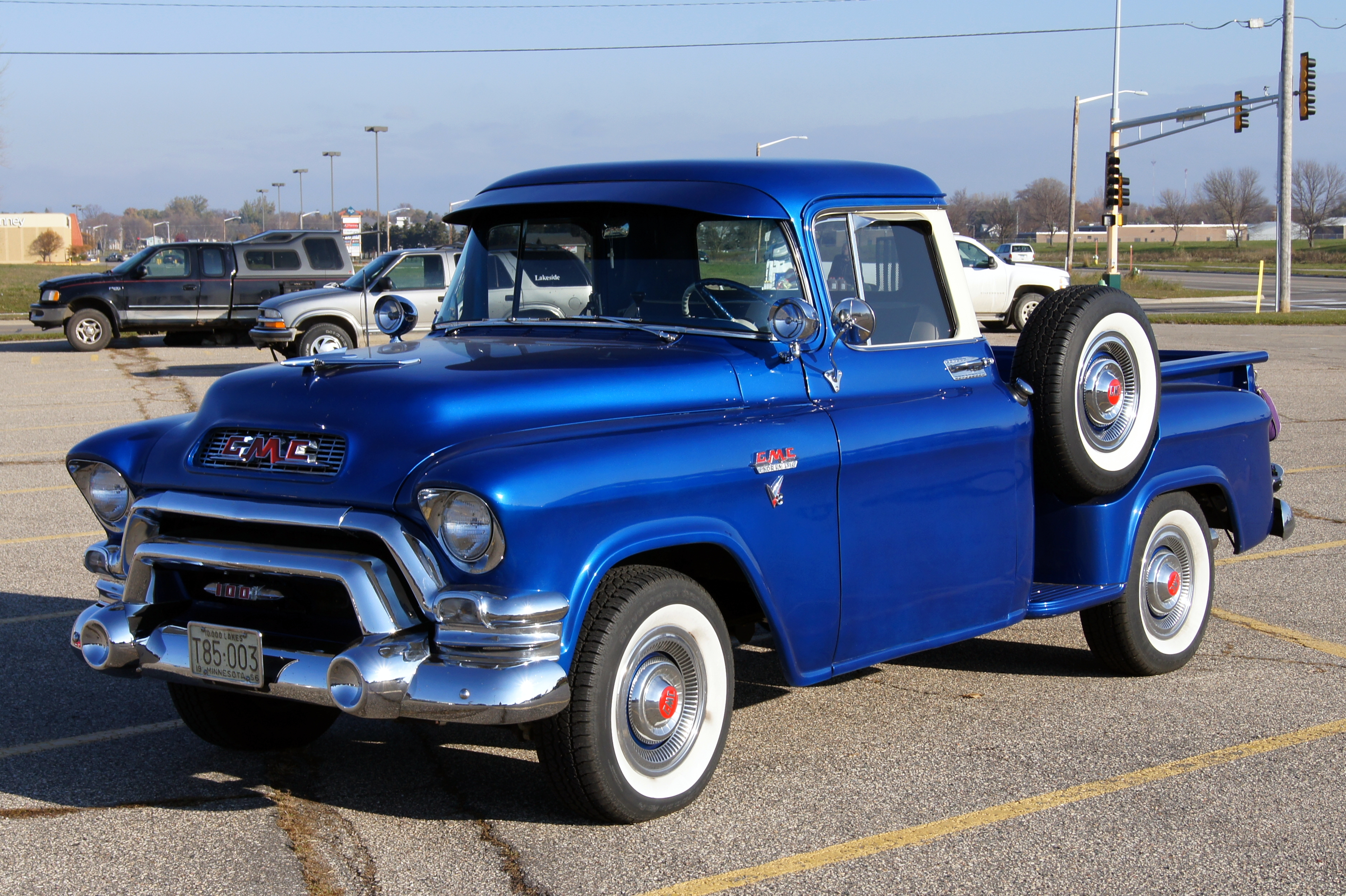
1956 GMC 100

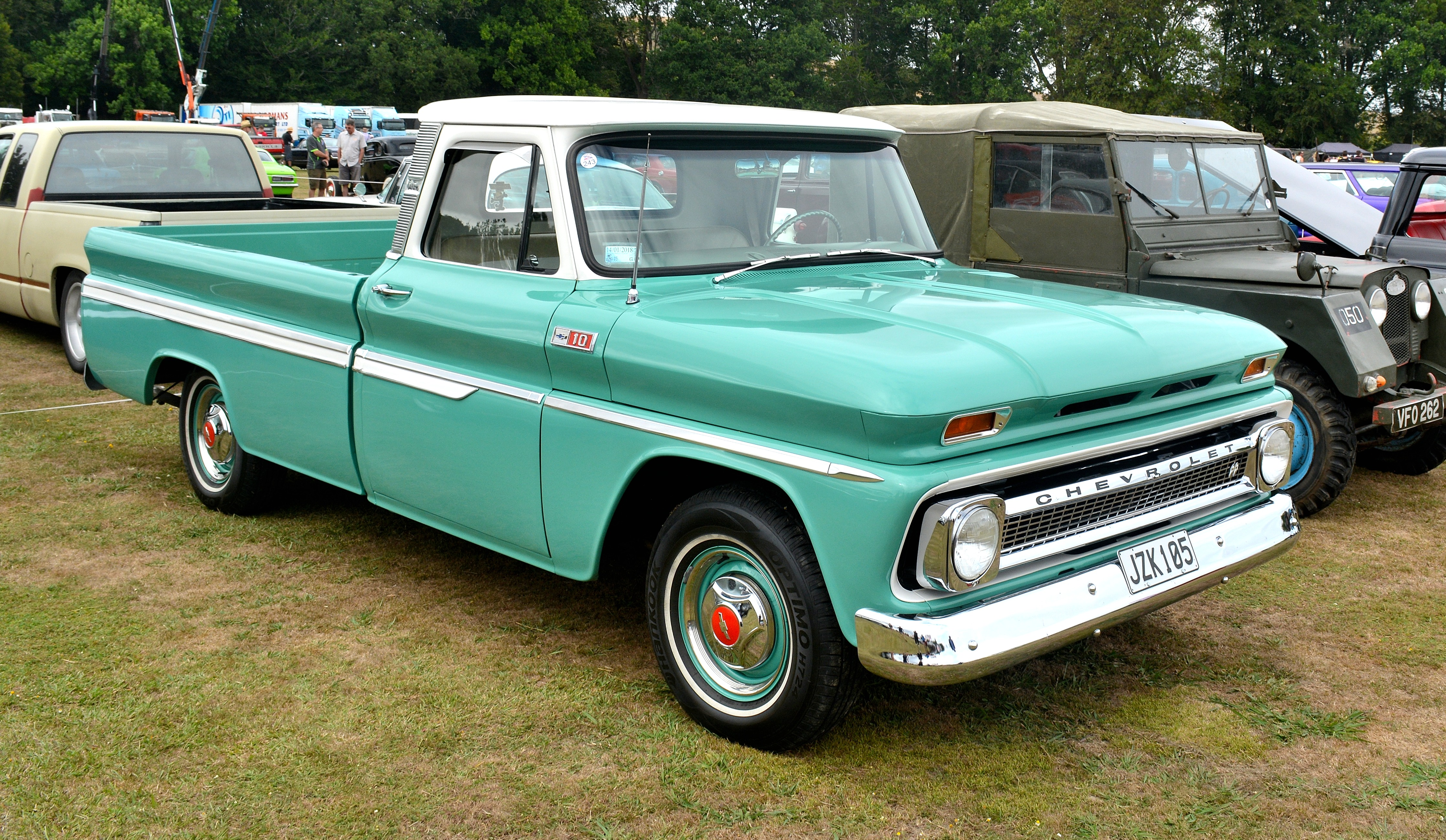
1965 Chevrolet C10 Pick-Up

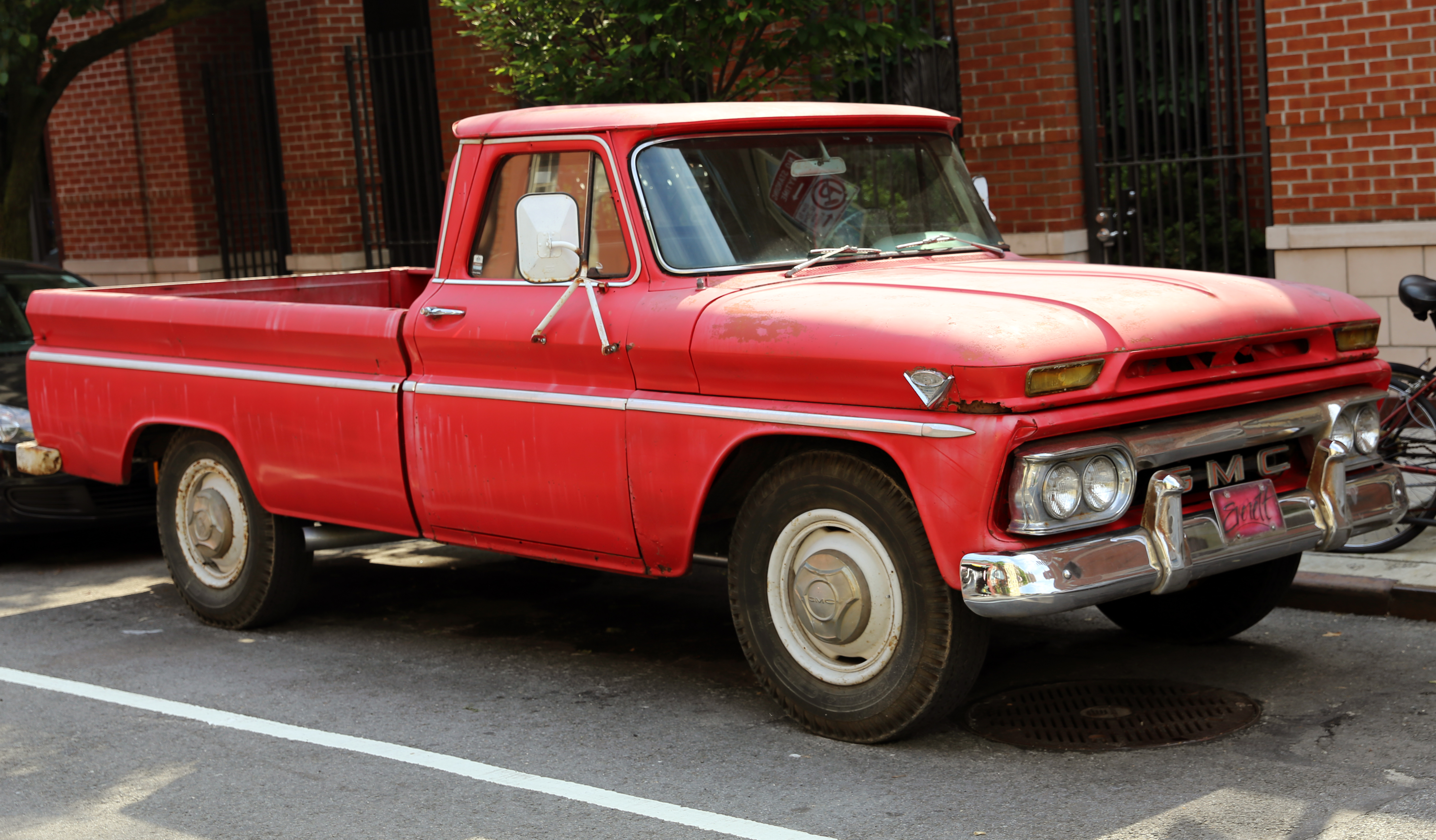
1966 GMC C-series pickup

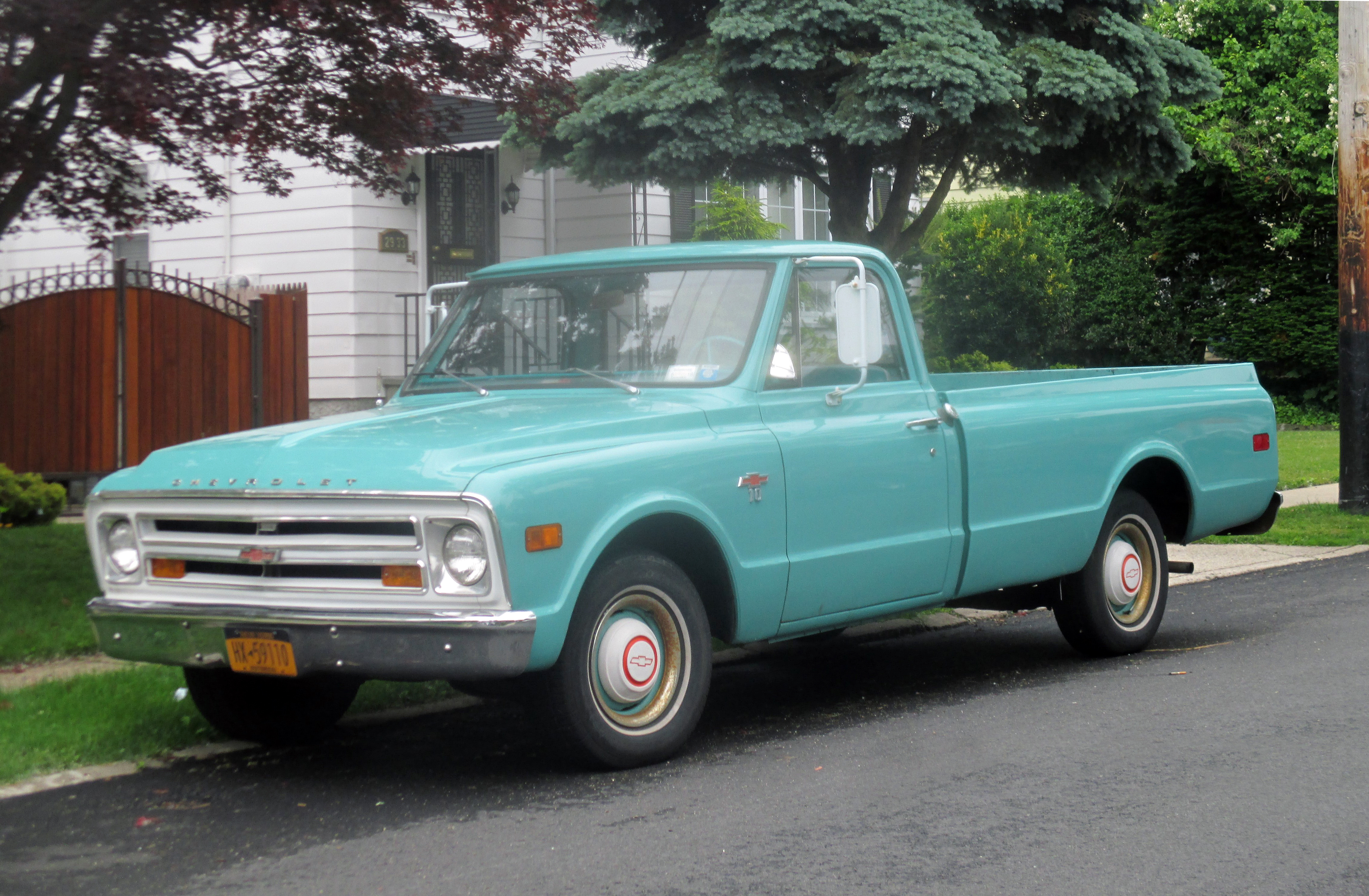
1968 Chevrolet C10

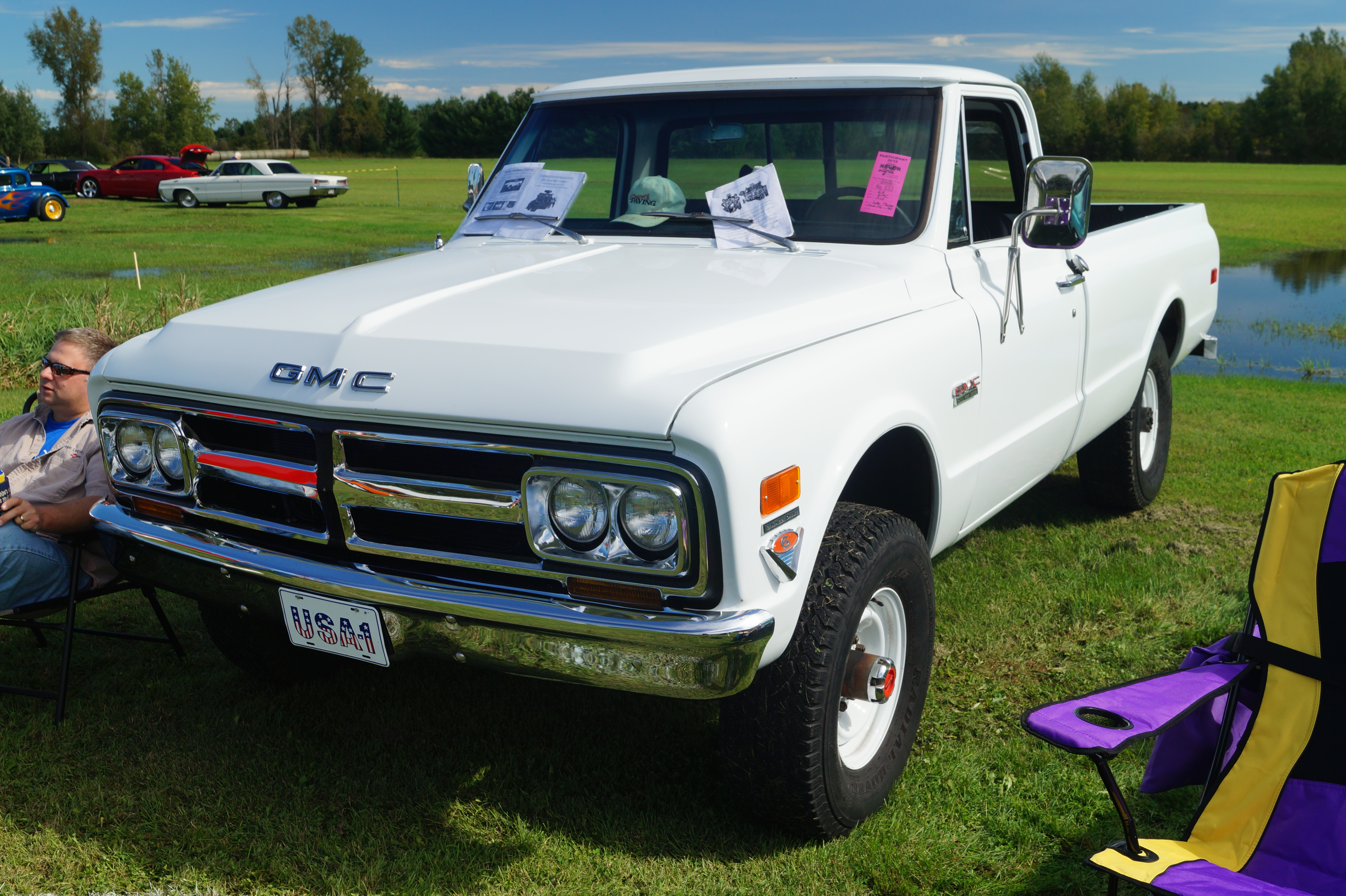
1968 GMC K2500 Super Custom

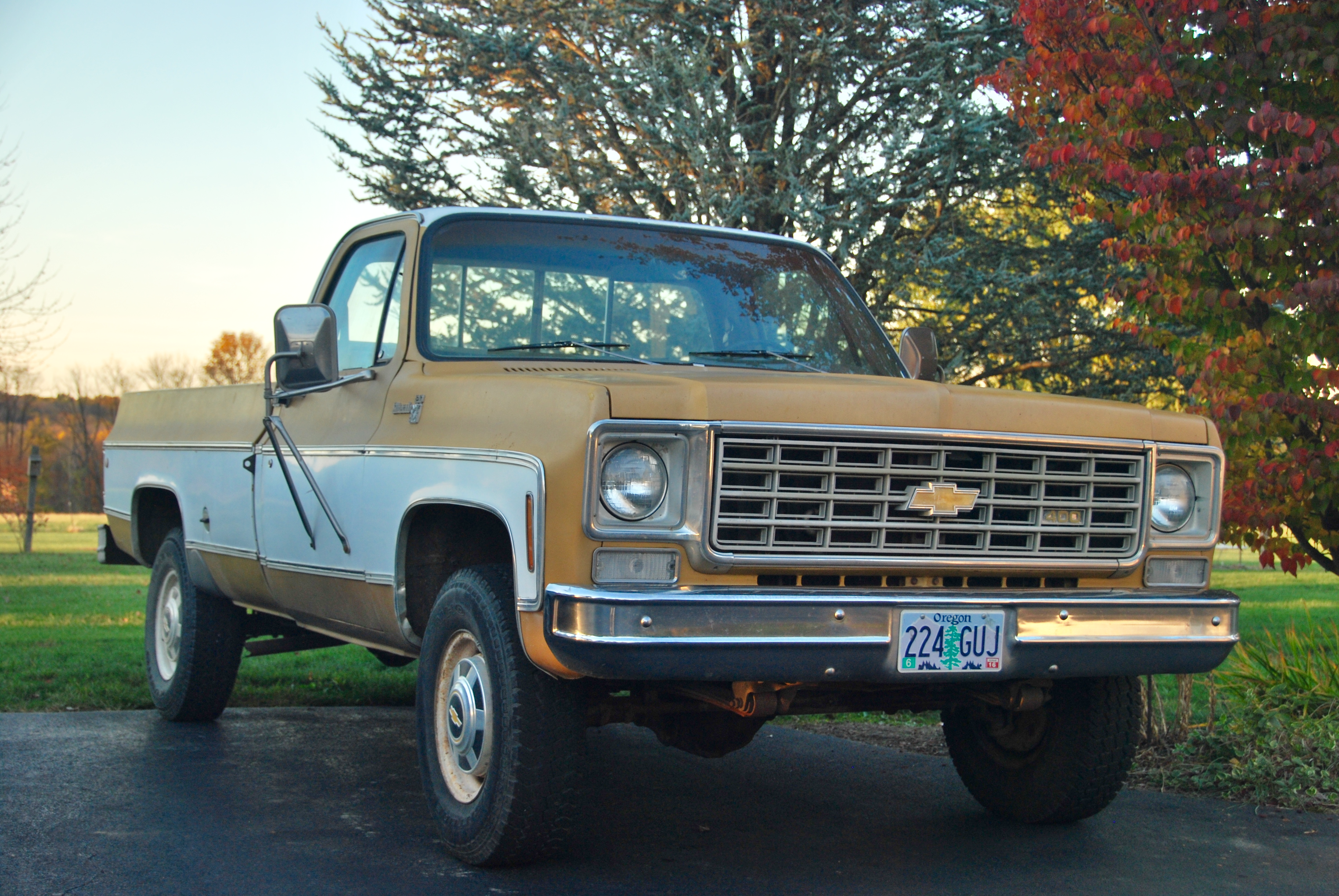
1976 Chevrolet K20

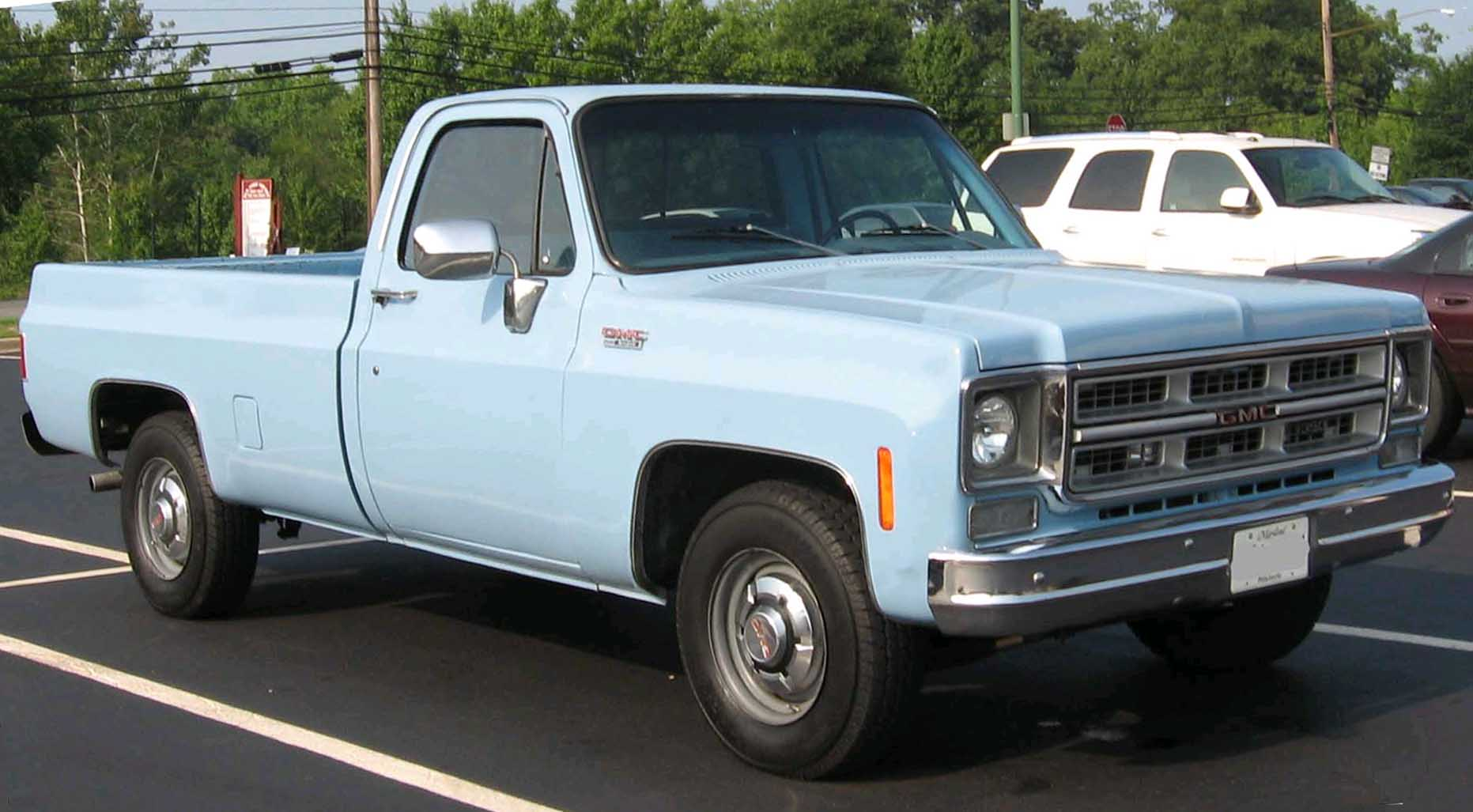
1975–1976 GMC C/K

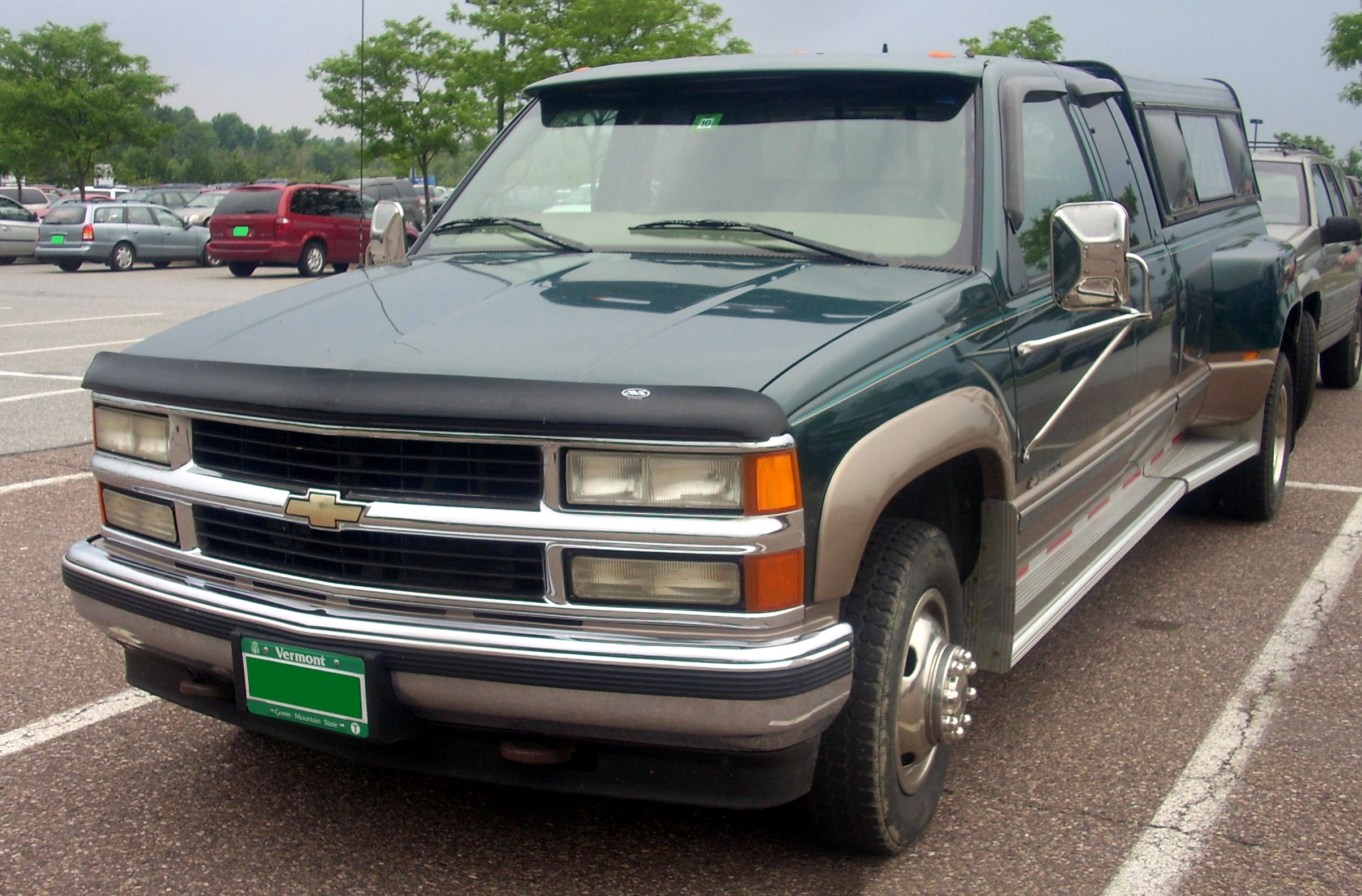
1997–2000 Chevrolet C3500 Silverado Extended Cab

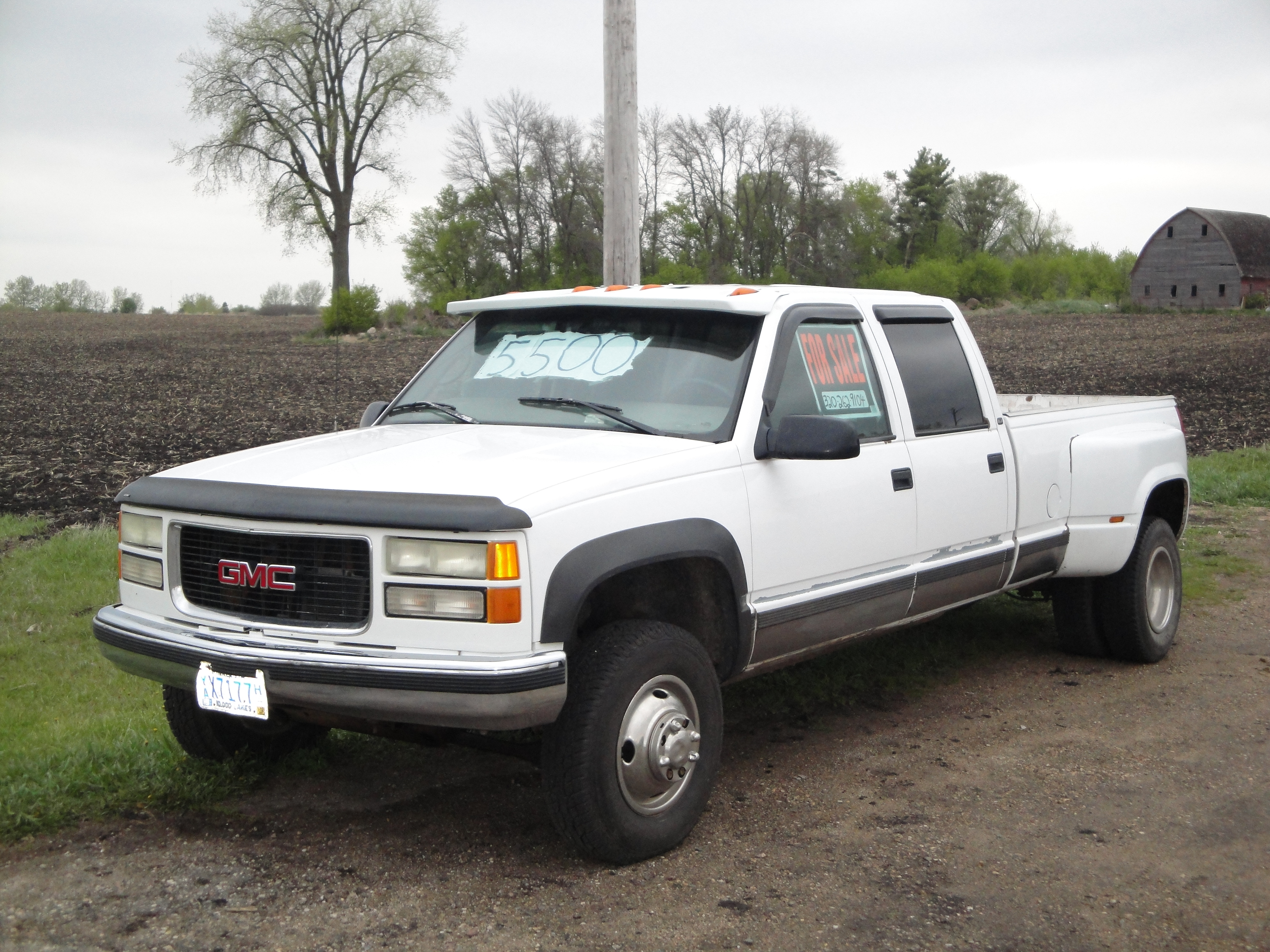
1997 GMC Sierra 3500 SLE Crew Cab

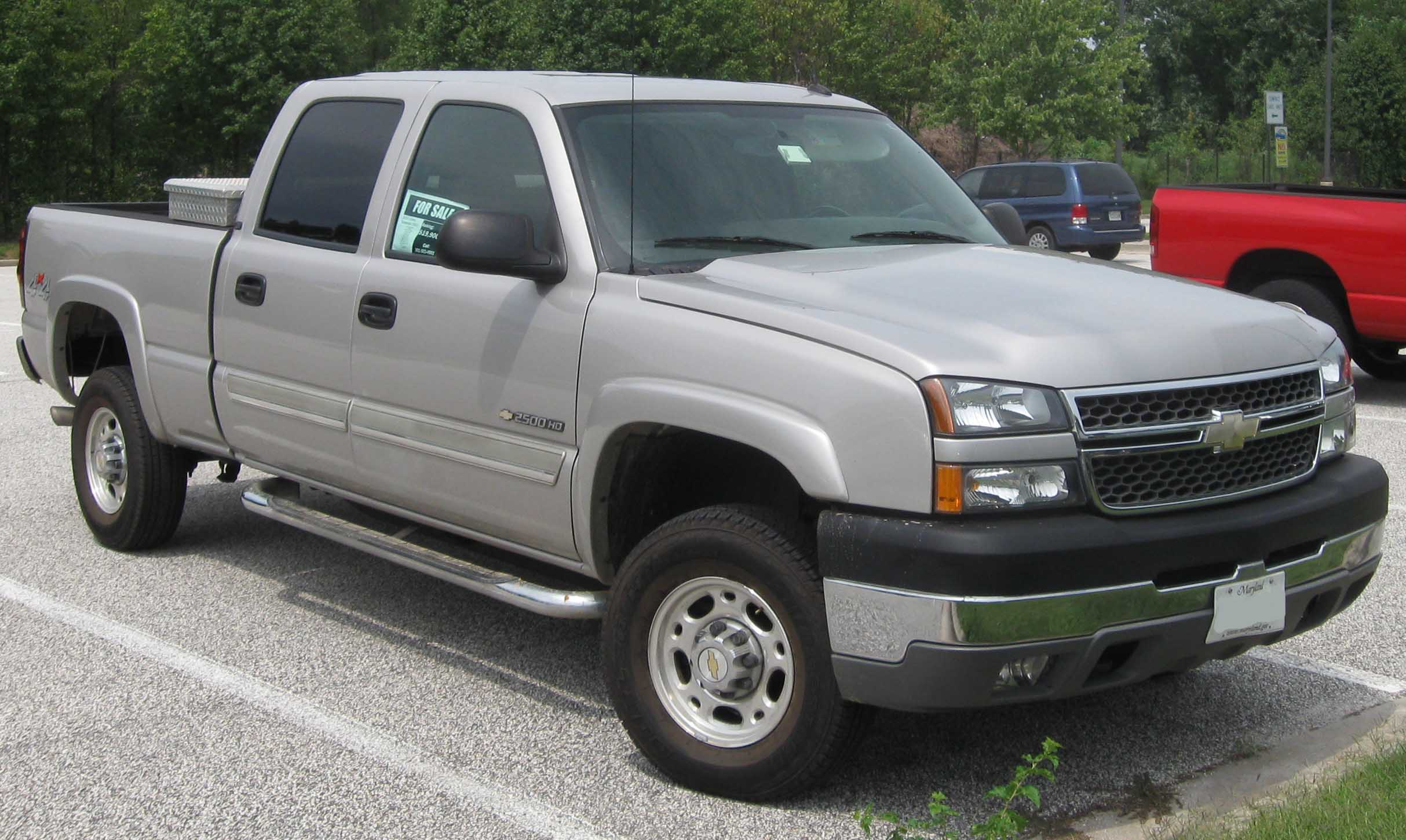
2005 Chevrolet Silverado Crew Cab

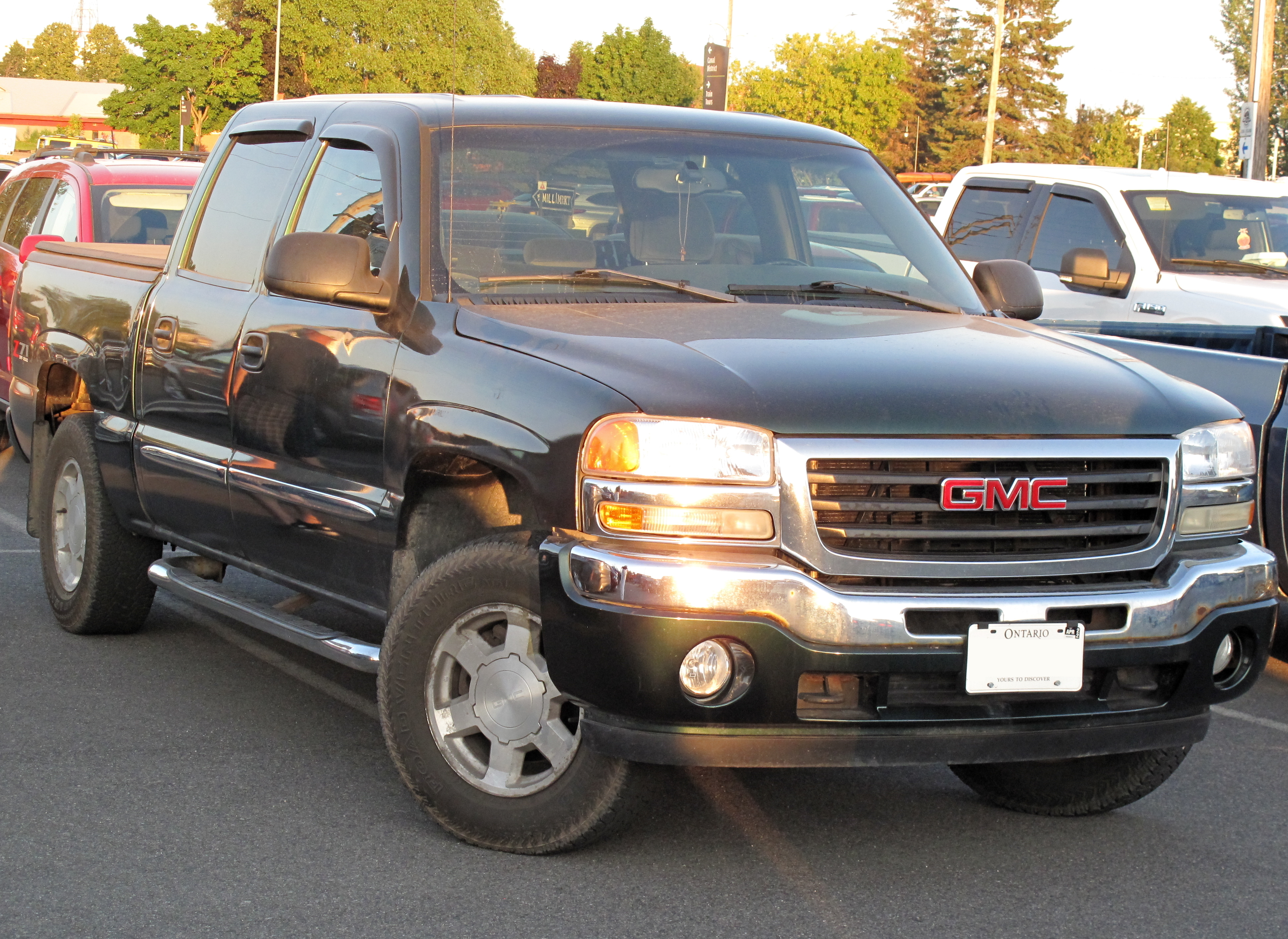
2006 GMC Sierra Crew Cab

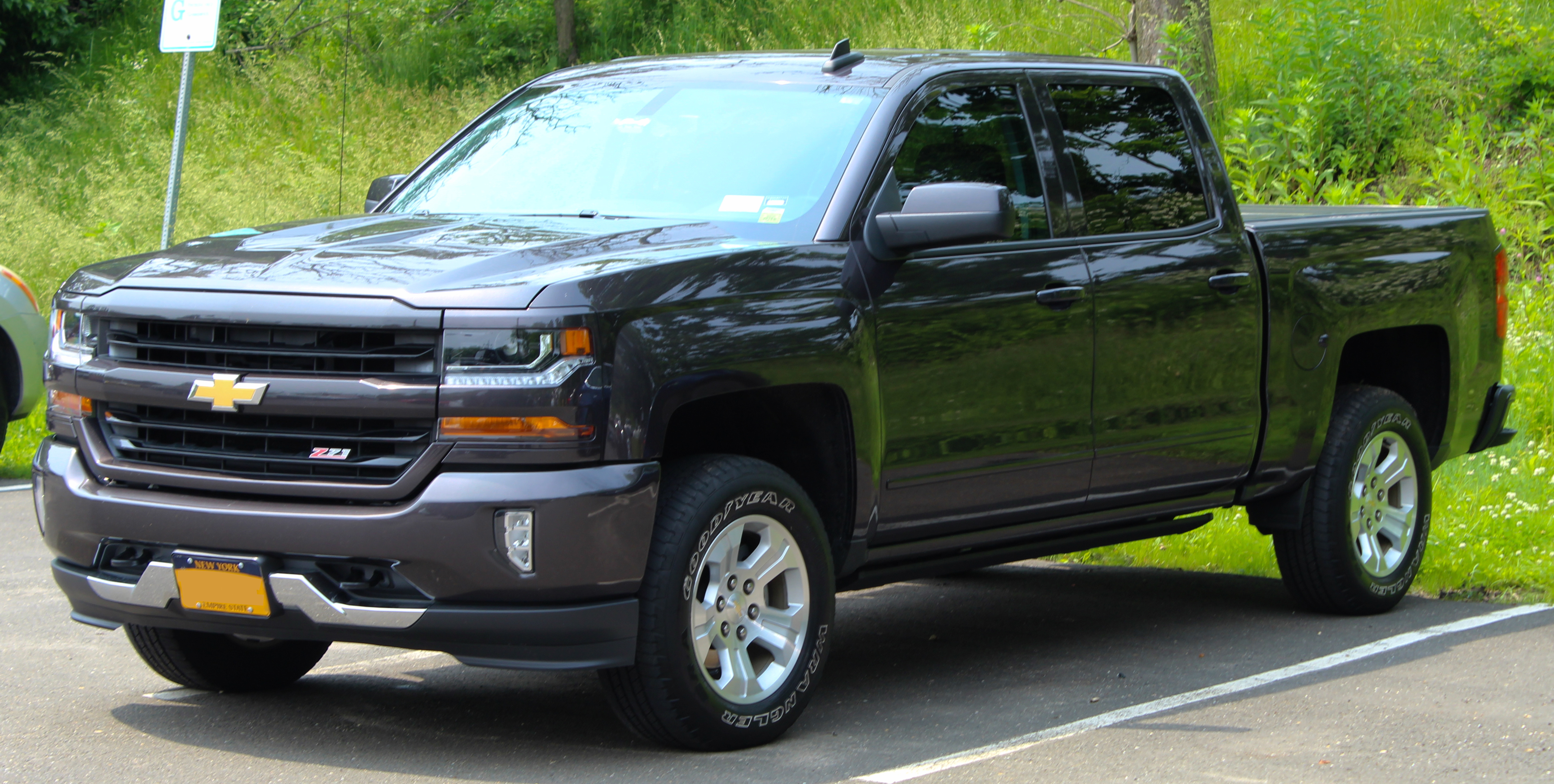
2016 Chevrolet Silverado

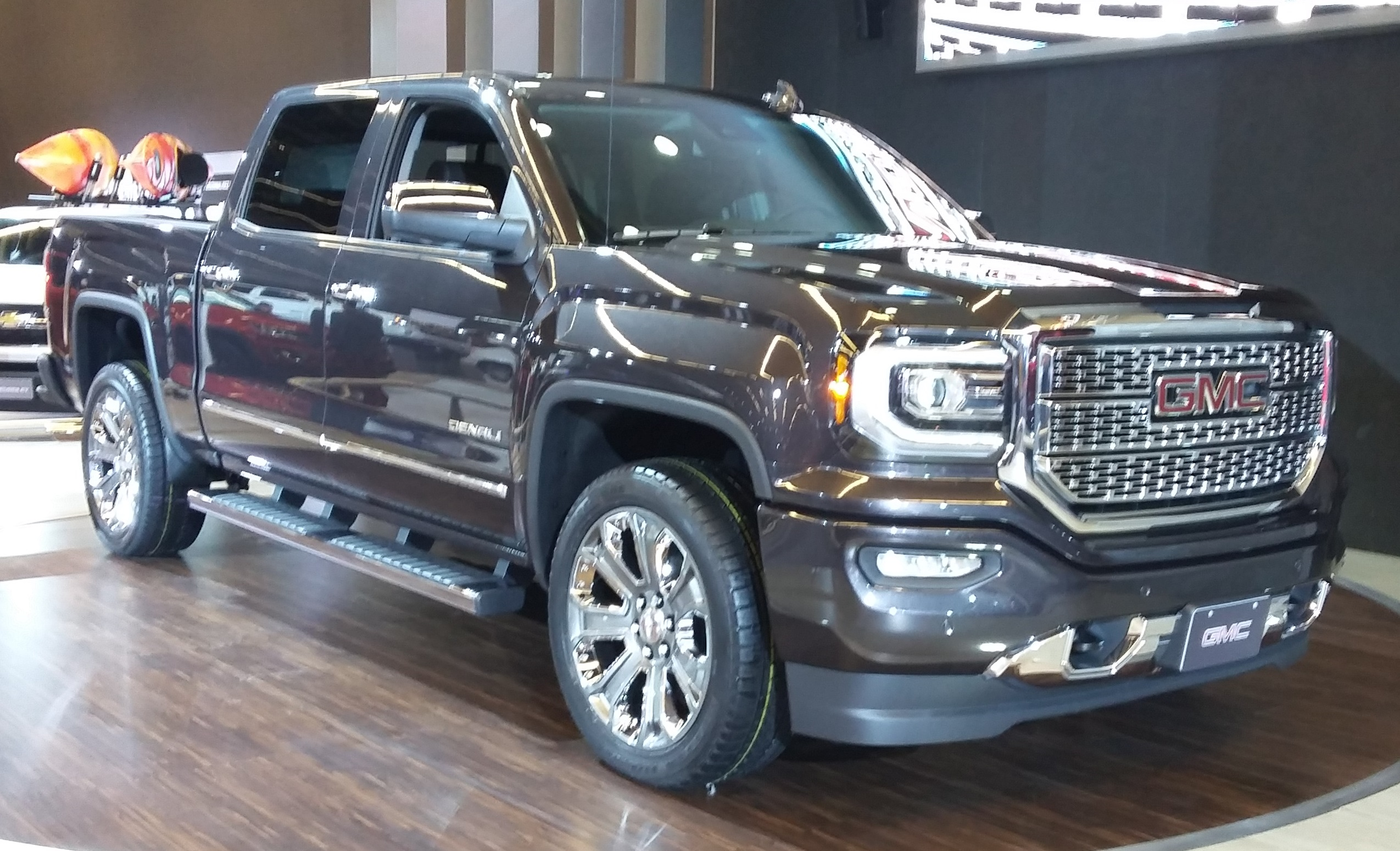
2016 GMC Sierra

== GMC models ==
=== Light-duty trucks ===
Image	Model	Introduced	Discontinued	Notes
	Rapid	1911	1915	1 t
	Rapid	1911	1915	2 t
	Reliance	1911	1915	3.5 t
	VC	~ 1913		1.25 t
	SC	~ 1913		2 t
	H	~ 1913		3 t
	HU	~ 1913		3.5 t
	40		1917	2 t
	30		1917	1.5 t
	15	1916	1917	0.75 t
	21	1916	1919	1 t
	70 A		1917	3.5 t
	70 B		1917	3.5 t
	71 A		1920	3.5 t
	71 B		1920	3.5 t
	41	1915	1920	2 t
	31	1915	1920	1.5 t
	K15	1922	1922	0,75 t
	K16	1922	1924	1 t
	K41	1921	1924	2 t
	K71	1922	1924	3,5 t
	T 11	1929	1930	0.5 t
	T-15A	1930	1932	0,75 t
	T 19	1927	1931	1,5 t
	T 20	1928	1928	1 t
	T 30	1927	1931	1.5 t
	T 60	1927	1931	3-3,5 t
	T and F series	1937	1938	Similar to the Chevrolet G/S and F/T series
	AC and AF series	1939	1940	AF series is cabover design
	C and E series	1941	1947	Little different from the Chevrolet AK Series trucks
	New Design series	1947	1955	Little different from the Chevrolet Advance-Design trucks
	Blue Chip series	1955	1959	Similar to the Chevrolet Task-Force trucks. Optional Pontiac V8
	C and K Series	1960	1991	half–, three-quarter– and one-ton trucks, with Sierra, Sierra Grande, High Sierra, and Sierra Classic trim lines
	Sprint	1971	1977	Coupe utility – GMC version of the 1971 to 1977 Chevrolet El Camino
	Caballero	1978	1987	Coupe utility – GMC version of the 1978 to 1987 Chevrolet El Camino
	S-15	1982	1990	Became the Sonoma in 1991
	Sonoma	1991	2004	Formerly the S-15 1982–1990
	Syclone	1991	1991	High performance version of the Sonoma
	Sierra	1988	current	GMC version of GMT400 Chevrolet C/K (1988–99) Chevrolet Silverado (1999–present) light- and heavy-duty pickup
	Canyon	2004	current	GMC version of Chevrolet Colorado midsize pickup
	Hummer EV SUT	2022 MY	current	General Motors' first all-electric off-road pickup

=== Medium-duty trucks ===
Image	Model	Introduced	Discontinued	Notes
	K	1911	1915	5t, engine 4 cylinder, 6435 cc, wheel base 3505 mm
	K101	1922	1924	5 to
	Varies, first letter denotes production year: A=1939-1940, C=1941-1945, E=1946, F=1947-1950, Z=1954, Y=1955, X=1956, T=1957, S=1958-1959, N=1960; Second letter denotes cab style: C=cab behind engine, F=cab over engine	1939	1959	Line sold to Navistar, now marketed under the WorkHorse brand.
	L-Series	1960	c.1984	Steel Tilt Cab
	TopKick	1980	2002	
	C-Series	1960	2002	
	Forward	1985	1997	rebadged Isuzu Elf
	W-Series	1998	2010	Rebadged Isuzu Elf
	T-Series	1994	2010	Rebadged Isuzu Forward
	TopKick	2003	2009	Model used for Ironhide in the Transformers film series

=== Heavy-duty trucks ===
Image	Model	Introduced	Discontinued	Notes
	DLR/F/“Crackerbox”	1959	1968	Aluminium Tilt Cab
	B-Model	1960	1966	
	7500	1963	1978	
	9500	1966	1978	
	Astro 95	1968	1988	
	General	1977	1988	
	Brigadier	1978	1988	

=== Buses ===
Image	Model	Introduced	Discontinued	Notes
	W-series	1920s	?	Yellow "Parlor" (highway) coaches
	P-series	1940s	1980	"Parlor" (highway) coaches
	"Old Look"	1940	1969	transit
	"New Look"	1959	1986	transit
	RTS	1977	1987	transit
	Classic	1982	1987	transit
	B-series	1966	2003	school bus
	S-series	1986	1989	school bus (forward control)

=== Vans ===
Image	Model	Introduced	Discontinued	Notes
	Handi-Van	1964	1970	
	Handi-Bus	1964	1970	
	Rally	1970	1996	GMC version of the Chevrolet Sportvan
	Vandura	1970	1996	GMC version of the Chevrolet Chevy Van
	Safari	1985	2005	GMC version of the Chevrolet Astro
	Savana	1996	current	GMC version of the Chevrolet Express

=== Sport utility vehicles ===
Image	Model	Introduced	Discontinued	Notes
	Suburban	1937	2006	Rebranded as Yukon XL for 2000, it was sold in the Middle East using the Suburban nameplate through the 2006 model year.
	Jimmy	1969	1991	GMC version of the Chevrolet Blazer
	S-15 Jimmy	1983	2005	GMC version of the Chevrolet Blazer
	Tracker	1989	1991	Canada only, GMC version of the Geo Tracker
	Typhoon	1992	1993	High performance version of the S-15 Jimmy
	Yukon	1992	current	GMC version of the Chevrolet K5 Blazer (1992-1994) and Chevrolet Tahoe (1995–present)
	Envoy	1998	2009	GMC version of the Chevrolet TrailBlazer
	Yukon Hybrid	2008	2013	GMC version of Chevrolet Tahoe Hybrid and Cadillac Escalade Hybrid
	Yukon XL	2000	current	Formerly the Suburban
	Acadia	2007	current	GMC version of the Chevrolet Traverse; became a mid-size crossover SUV commencing with the 2017 model year
	Terrain	2010	current	GMC version of the Chevrolet Equinox
	Hummer EV SUV	2024	current	Sport Utility variant of the electric Hummer EV off-road sub-brand

=== Motorhomes ===
Image	Model	Introduced	Discontinued	Notes
	GMC motorhome	1973	1978	The only Class A recreational vehicle produced by a car manufacturer. There were 12,921 produced.

=== Military vehicles ===
Image	Model	Introduced	Discontinued	Notes
	ACK/ACKWX	1940	1940	Originally contracted for the French army
	CCKW/CCW	1941	1945	
	AFKWX	1941	1945	Cab over engine
	DUKW	1942	1945	Amphibious

=== Sedans ===
Image	Model	Introduced	Discontinued	Notes
	Chevette	1992	1995	Rebadged Chevrolet Chevette intended for the Argentinian market

== See also ==
- General Motors
- History of General Motors
