= Rapid Motor Vehicle Company =

Manufacturer

Coordinates: 42.626026°N 83.287559°W

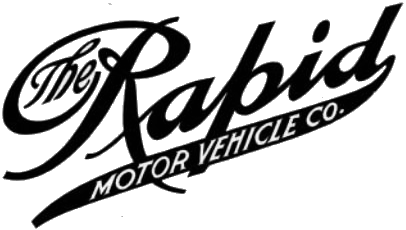
- Formerly: Grabowsky Motor Vehicle Company
- Type: Private
- Industry: Automotive
- Genre: Commercial Vehicles
- Founded: 1900; 126 years ago
- Founder: Max and Morris Grabowsky
- Defunct: 1911; 115 years ago
- Fate: Acquired by General Motors in 1909 and merged with Reliance Motor Car Company in 1911 to form General Motors Truck Company (renamed GMC in 1913)
- Successor: GMC
- Headquarters: Pontiac, Michigan, U.S.
- Area served: U.S.
- Products: Automobiles, autoparts

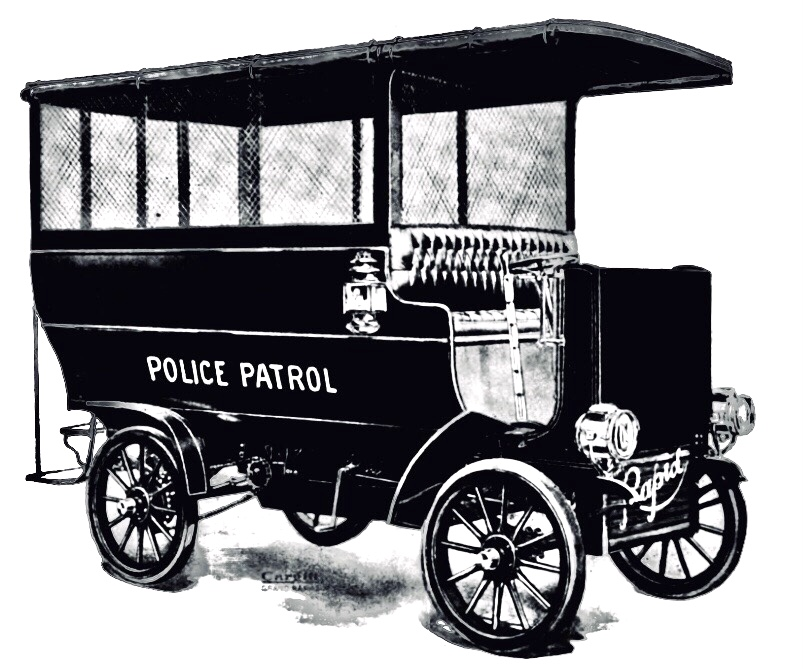
Rapid Motor Vehicle Company (1908) Motor Police Patrol

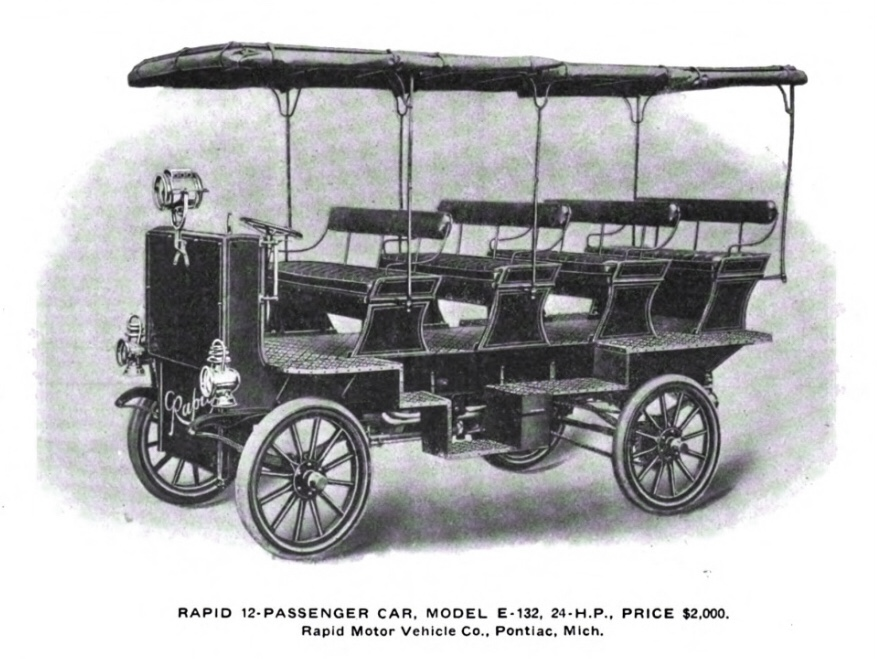
Rapid Model E (1908)

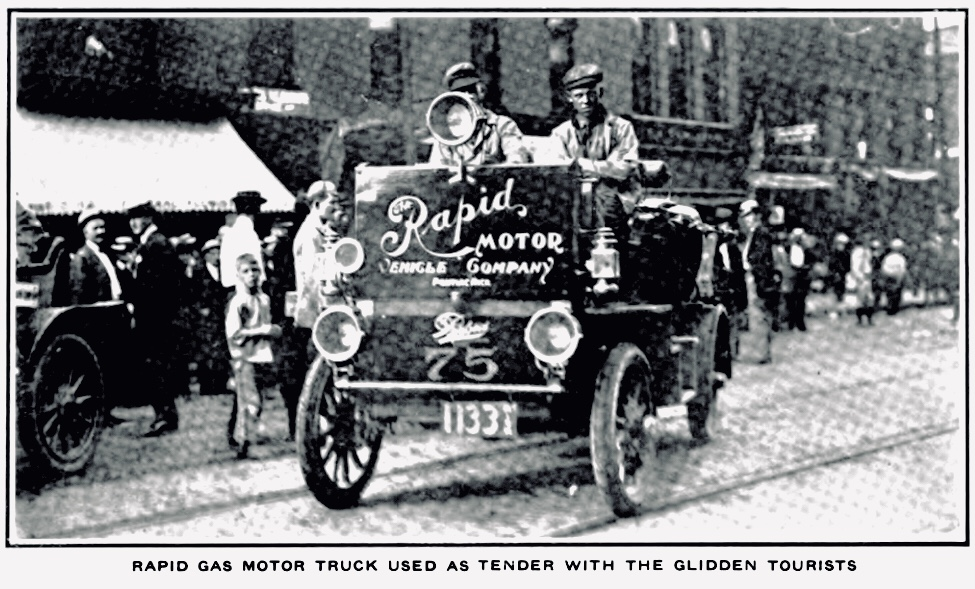
Rapid Motor Vehicle Glidden Tour Tire and Supply Truck (1909)

The Rapid Motor Vehicle Company was founded in 1902 in Pontiac, Michigan — by Grabowsky brothers, namely Max (1874–1946) and Morris (1870–1935) — whose earlier venture, Grabowsky Motor Vehicles Company had been founded in Detroit in 1900. They went on to build one-ton trucks and were the beginning of GMC Truck division after they were acquired by General Motors in 1909.

== History ==
In 1905 Rapid built a new assembly plant at 25 Rapid Street abutting the Grand Trunk Western Railroad tracks on the south side of Pontiac, Michigan. The Rapid Street Plant 1 was the nucleus of what would become the Pontiac West Assembly complex. Grabowsky Power Wagon Co., Detroit, Mich. Gasoline wagons rated to carry 1½ tons, 3 tons and 5 tons are being made by this company.

Rapid was the "first truck to conquer Pikes Peak" in a 1909 road race.

=== Products ===
Vehicles exhibited St Grand Central Palace (1909)

- One 5 ton gasoline Truck chassis
- One 2 ton gasoline Truck chassis
- One Combination Fire Wagon 2 ton
- One Hospital Ambulance 1 ton
- One 12-Passenger Pullman Gasoline Car 1 ton Model E
- One 20-Passenger „Tourist“ 2 ton
- One 1 Ton Gasoline Delivery Car
- One 2 Ton Gasoline Delivery Car
- the Glidden Tour Tire and Supply Truck

=== General Motors Era ===
General Motors Company was founded by William C. Durant in 1908. Durant began acquiring the stock of Rapid Motor Vehicle Company in 1908 and in 1909 had a controlling interest. Rapid Motor Vehicle Company became a subsidiary of General Motors in 1909. In 1911 the Rapid Motor Vehicle Company ceased to exist when General Motors Truck Company was created and all of General Motors truck subsidiaries were absorbed in to the new business unit. In 1912 the Rapid brand name was discontinued in favor of GMC.

== Advertisements ==
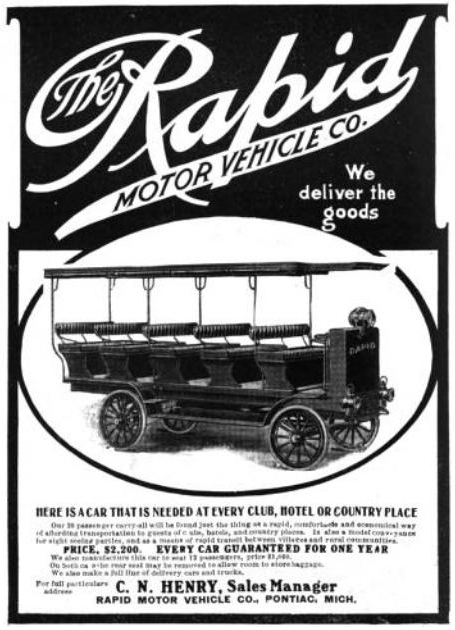
Rapid Motor Vehicle Company of Pontiac, Michigan - 1906

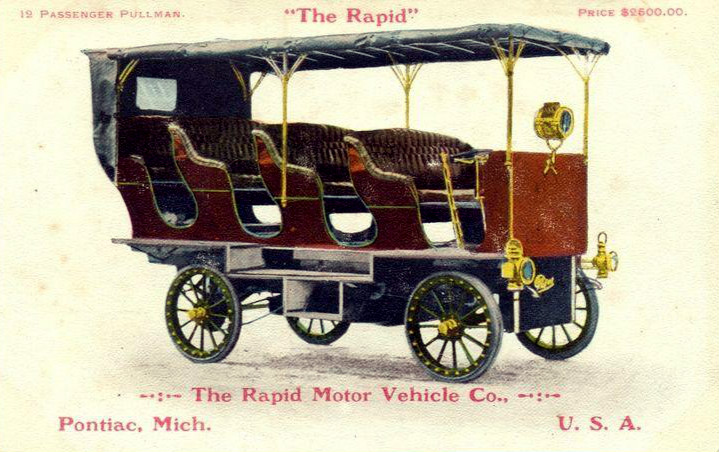
12 passenger Pullman vehicle.

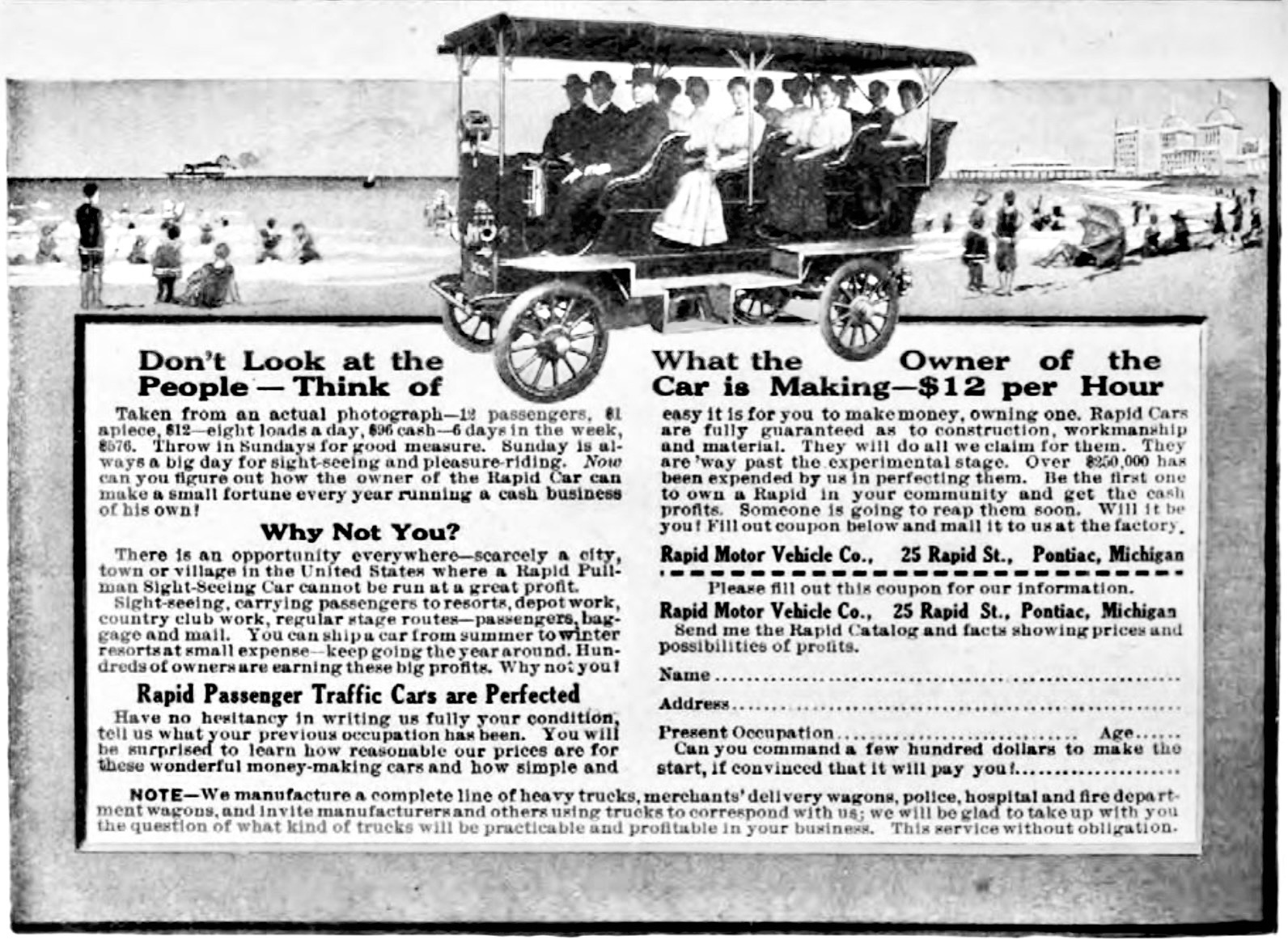
Rapid 12 passenger bus (1909)

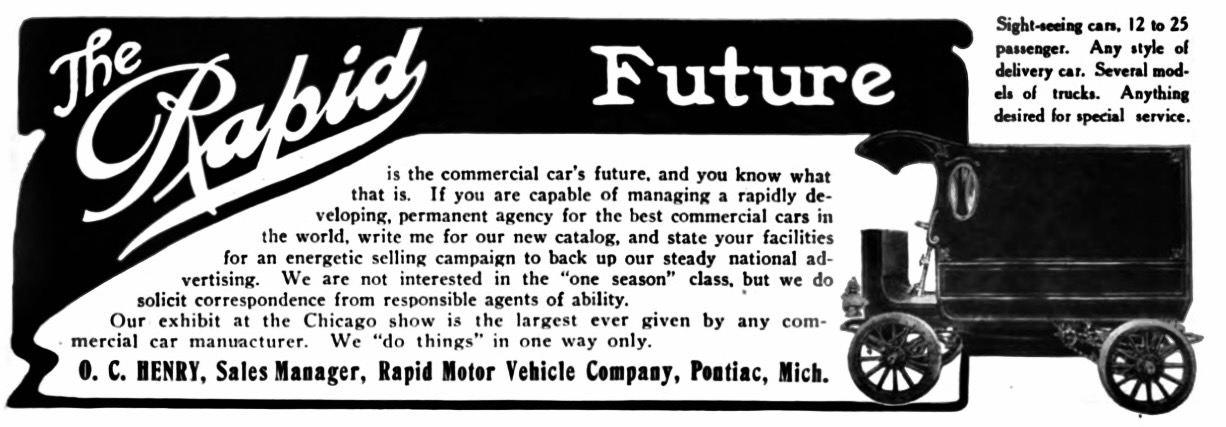
Rapid advertisement (1907)
