= Data reliability =

The term data reliability may refer to:

- Reliability (statistics), the overall consistency of a measure
- Data integrity, the maintenance of, and the assurance of the accuracy and consistency of, data over its entire life-cycle
