= Reliant =

Reliant may also refer to:

- Reliant Energy, an energy corporation from Houston, Texas, United States
- Reliant Motors, a defunct British car manufacturer
- Reliant Pharmaceuticals, now owned by GlaxoSmithKline
- Stinson Reliant, a utility and trainer aircraft
- Hipp's Superbirds Reliant, an ultralight aircraft
- Hipp's Superbirds Reliant SX, an ultralight aircraft
- Plymouth Reliant, a North American car
- The Reliant UNIX, ex. SINIX
- Reliant (YT-803), a US Navy Valiant-class tugboat

== See also ==
- Reliance (disambiguation)
- Relient K, an American Christian rock band
