= Reliance (automobile) =

Defunct American motor vehicle manufacturer

Reliance Automobile Manufacturing Company Reliance Motor Car Company
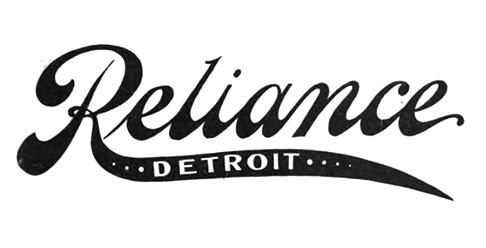
- Industry: Automotive
- Founded: 1904; 122 years ago
- Defunct: 1911; 115 years ago
- Fate: Acquired by General Motors in 1909 and merged with Rapid Motor Vehicle Company in 1911 to form General Motors Truck Company (renamed GMC in 1913)
- Successor: GMC
- Headquarters: Detroit, Michigan, United States
- Key people: E. O. Abbott, W. K. Ackerman, Fred O. Paige
- Products: Automobiles, Trucks

The Brass era Reliance automobile was manufactured by the Reliance Automobile Manufacturing Company in Detroit, Michigan from 1904 to 1907.

== History ==
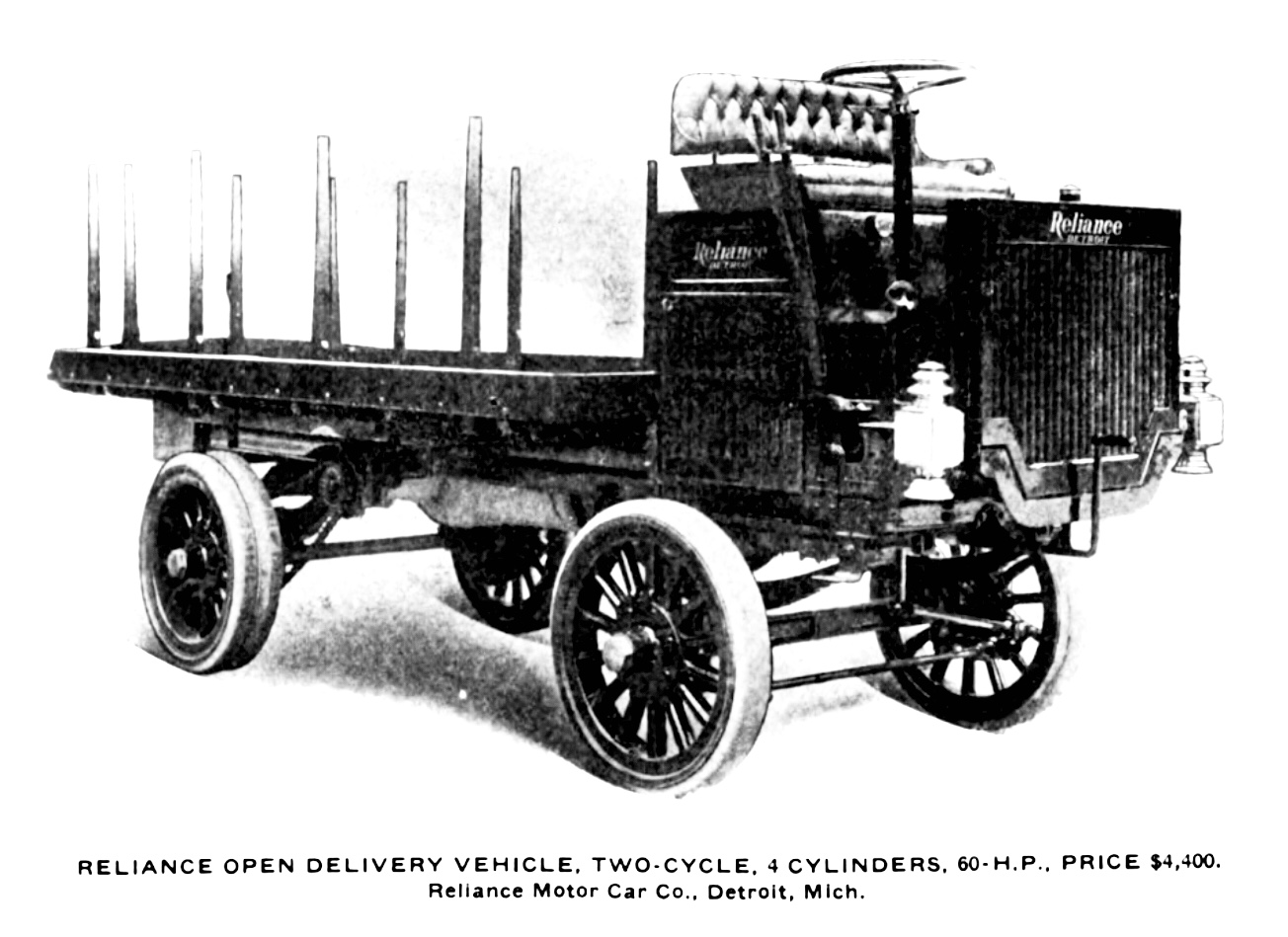
Reliance 60 hp (1908)

The Reliance was a two-cylinder, 3.2 liter water-cooled engine car with selective transmission and shaft-drive. It was designed by E. O. Abbott and W. K. Ackerman, both formerly with Cadillac.The body style was a side-entrance tonneau and the company wanted to advertise they were the first in the United States to introduce it, and pre-dated production to 1903 instead of 1904. Peerless and Orlo both introduced a side-entrance body in 1904.

The Reliance had a King of Belgium tonneau body style for 1905 and was priced at $1,250, equivalent to $44,792 in 2025. The company was under-capitalized and was reorganized in 1904 as Reliance Motor Car Company, with Fred O. Paige taking charge shortly after. A commercial truck was added in 1906 and from February 1907 only trucks were manufactured.

Reliance sold the passenger car production and it would later become the Crescent automobile. Reliance was purchased in 1909 by General Motors and the Reliance truck evolved into the first GMC truck. Fred Paige departed to build his Paige automobile.

== Advertisements ==
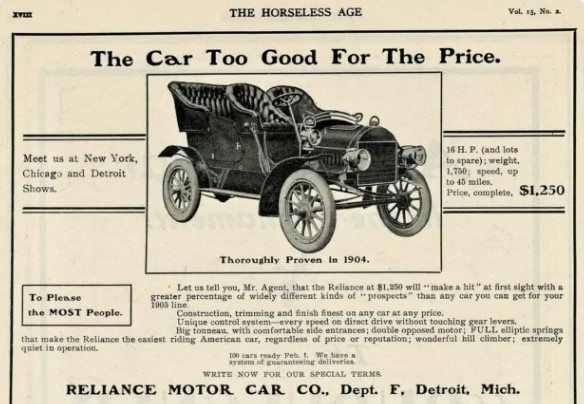
1904 Reliance Model Two Touring car advertisement in the Horseless Age magazine

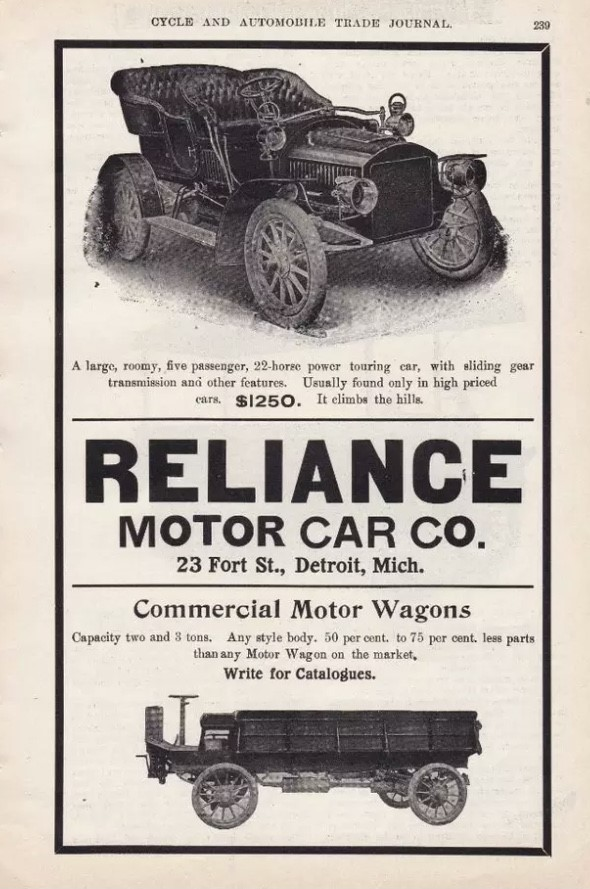
1906 Reliance automobile and truck advertisement in the Cycle and Automobile Trade Journal

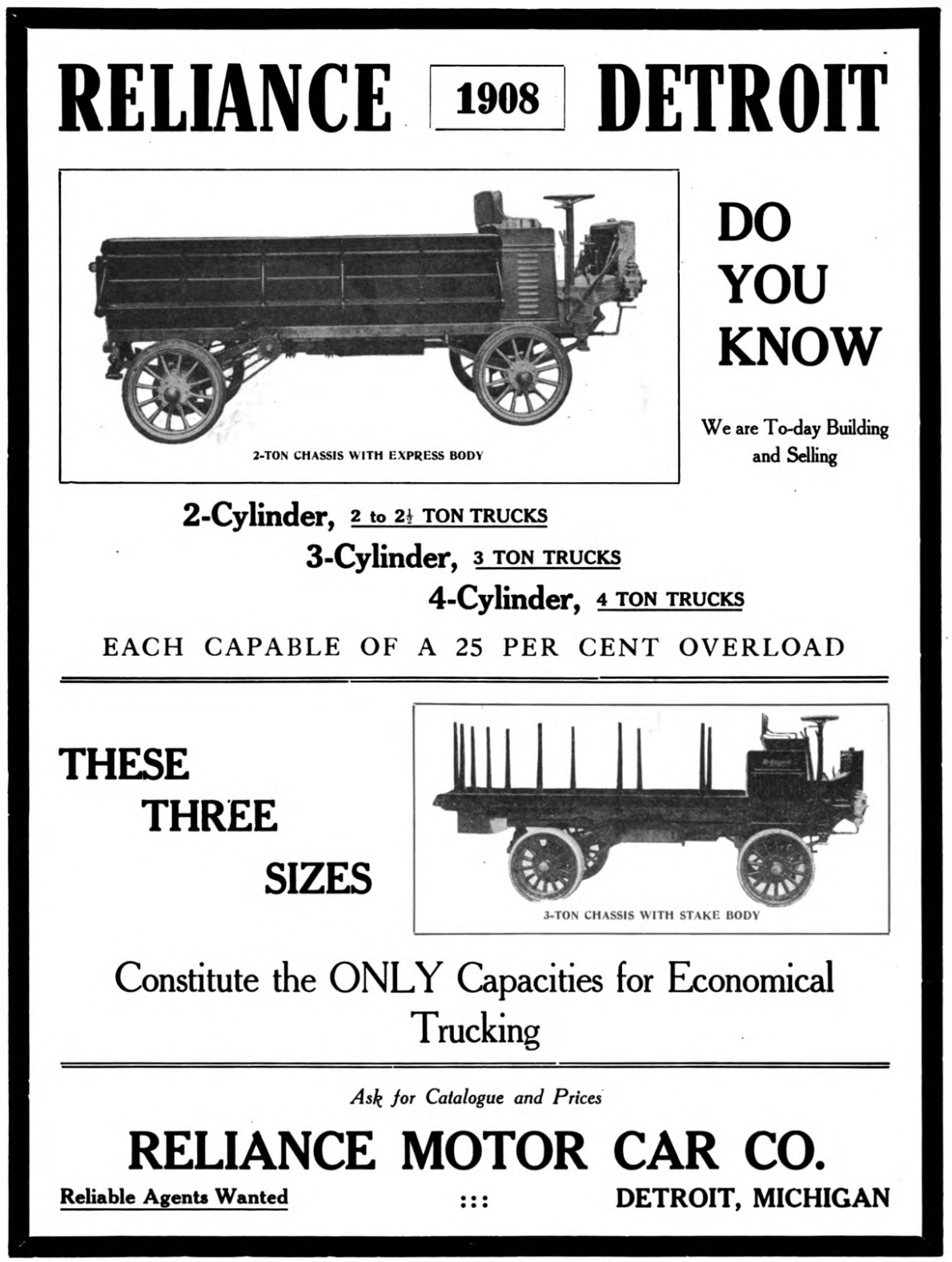
Reliance advertisement (1908)

Reliance Truck advertisement (1910)
