= The Godwin Group =

American manufacturing company

The Godwin Group is a truck equipment manufacturer headquartered in Dunn, North Carolina comprising nine subsidiaries: Godwin Manufacturing Company, Inc., R/S-Godwin Truck Body Company, LLC, Galion-Godwin Truck Body Company, LLC, Williamsen-Godwin Truck Body Company, Champion Hoist and Equipment, Good Roads by Godwin, Godwin Import Export LLC, Godwin Aviation LLC, and Allied Mobile Systems. The company specializes in dump bodies, truck hoists, and snow removal equipment such as snow plows and salt spreaders. Founded in April 2004, the firm was created to centralize operations of each subsidiary. The Godwin Group is one of the largest family-owned and operated truck equipment manufacturers in the United States.

The offices of The Godwin Group are located at 200 Champion Drive in Dunn, a large manufacturing facility originally owned by sports apparel company Champion Products, Inc. After Champion relocated most of its operations to Mexico in March 1999, the 250,000 square foot facility remained vacant until purchased by The Godwin Group in 2004. The facility houses both The Godwin Group offices and one of their subsidiaries, Champion Hoist and Equipment.

With six of the nine firms located in Dunn, the city has been dubbed the truck body capital of the world.

Despite the residual economic woes of the COVID-19 pandemic, The Godwin Group posted a 13.1% YOY increase in sales in 2021 making it their most profitable year ever according to Pat Godwin Sr.

In 2022, The Godwin Group installed the world's most powerful CNC laser fiber machine, manufactured by German company Eagle Laser. At the time of installation it was only the second of its kind in North America; the other was located in Pennsylvania.

== Companies ==
=== Godwin Manufacturing Company, Inc. ===
Godwin Manufacturing Company, Inc. was founded on April 1, 1966, by Pat Godwin Sr. in Dunn, North Carolina. Godwin Sr. dropped out of school in sixth grade to work at his family's sweet potato farm in Sampson County, North Carolina. Later in his twenties, Godwin worked as a Pepsi-Cola delivery driver until he left his job and started a welding business, Godwin Welding Service, in his back yard which would eventually grow into Godwin Manufacturing.
