= Pickup truck =

Light-duty truck with an enclosed cab and an open cargo area

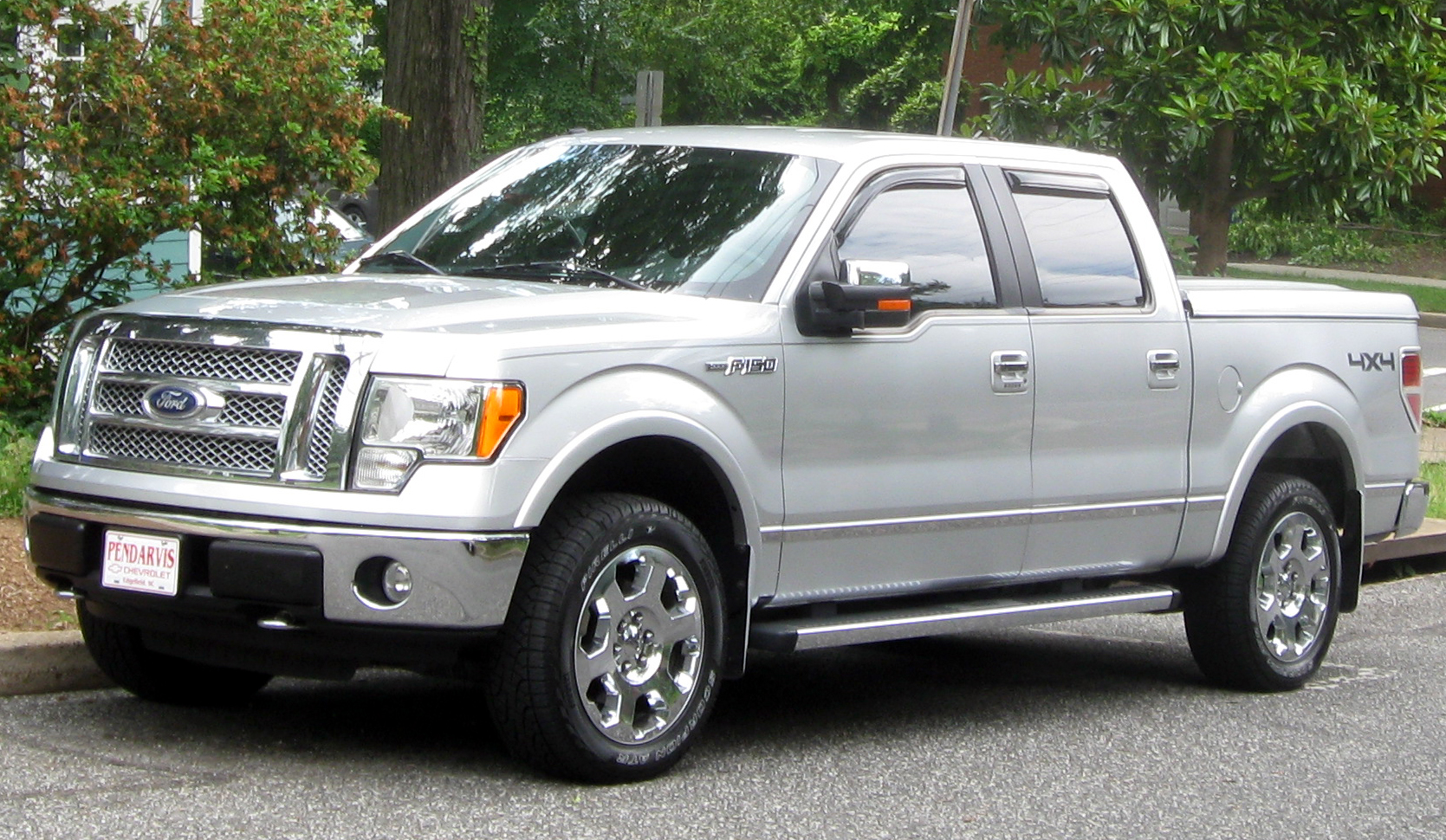
2009–2012 Ford F-150 Lariat SuperCrew full-size truck with tonneau cover, a crew cab configuration , and running boards

A pickup truck or pickup is a light or medium duty truck that has an enclosed cabin, and a back end made up of a cargo bed that is enclosed by three low walls with no roof (this cargo bed back end sometimes consists of a tailgate and removable covering). In Australia and New Zealand, both pickups and coupé utilities are called utes, short for utility vehicle. In South Africa, people of all language groups often use the term bakkie, a diminutive of Afrikaans: bak, meaning bowl or container, referring to the truck bed.

Once a work or farming tool with few creature comforts, in the 1950s, American consumers began purchasing pickups for lifestyle reasons, and by the 1990s, less than 15 percent of owners reported use in work as the pickup truck's primary purpose. In North America, the pickup is mostly used as a passenger car and accounts for about 18% of total vehicles sold in the United States. Full-sized pickups and SUVs are an important source of revenue for major car manufacturers such as Ford, General Motors, and Stellantis, accounting for more than two-thirds of their global pre-tax earnings, though they make up just 16% of North American vehicle production. These vehicles have a high profit margin and a high price tag; in 2018, Kelley Blue Book cited an average cost (including optional features) of US$47,174 for a new Ford F-150.

The term pickup is of unknown origin. It was used by Studebaker in 1913. By the 1930s, it had become the standard term in certain markets for a light-duty truck.

== History ==
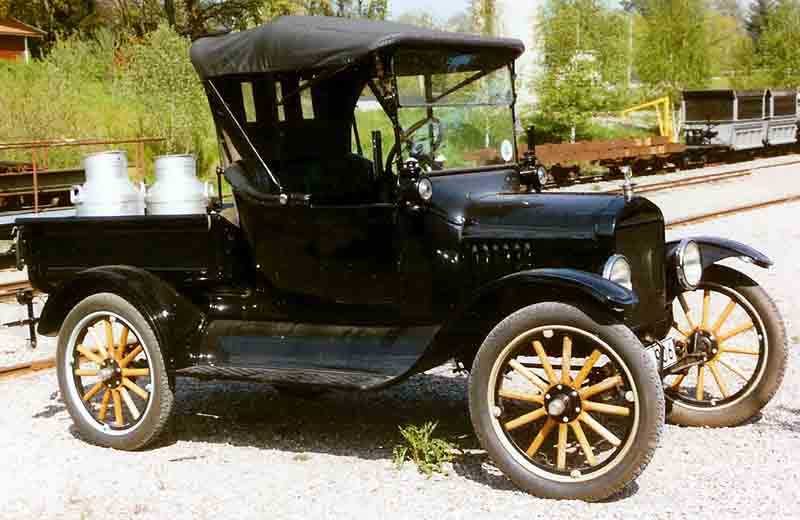
A 1922 Ford Model T pickup

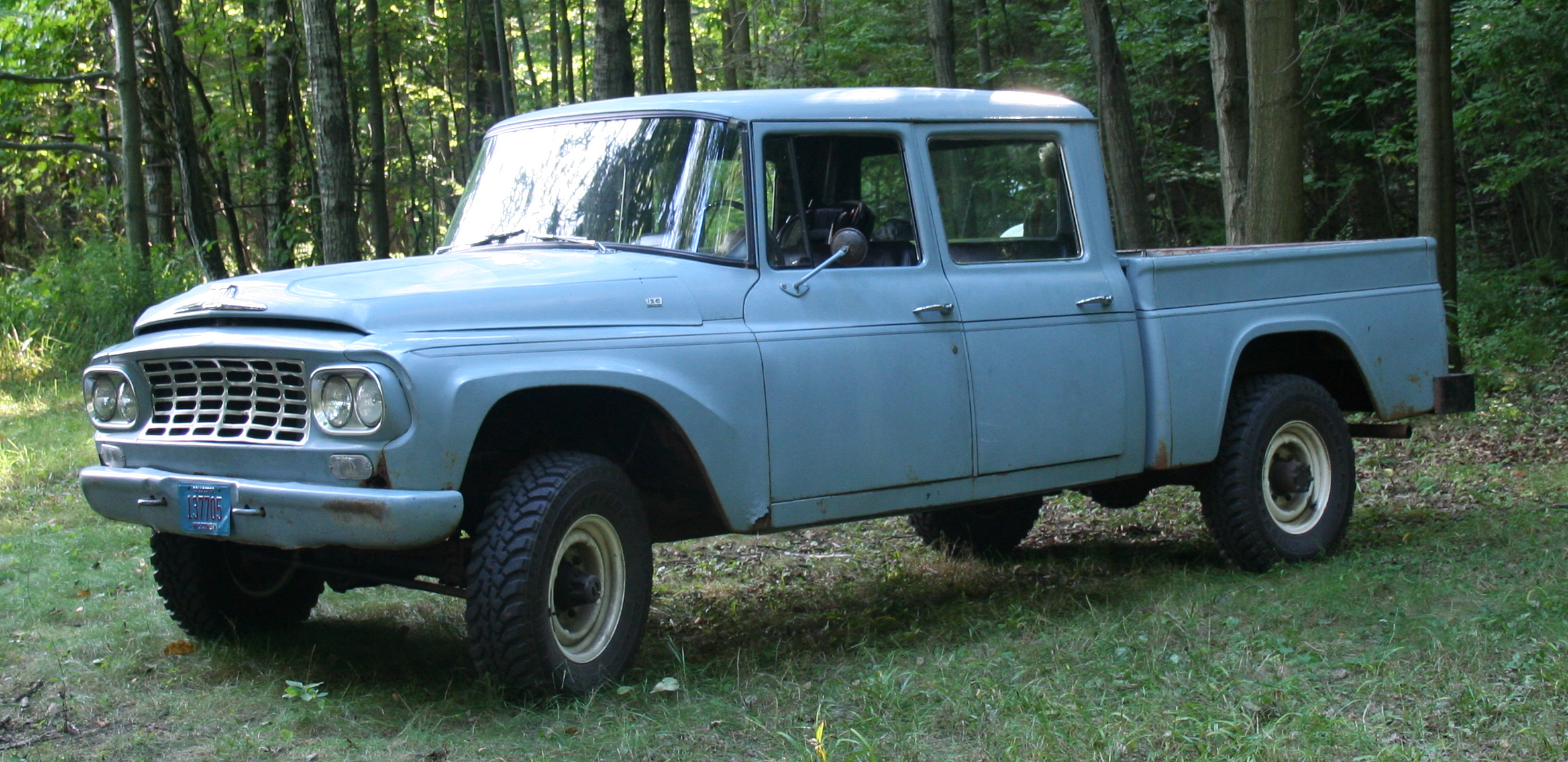
A 1961 International Travelette

In the early days of automobile manufacturing, vehicles were sold only as a chassis and third parties added bodies on top. In 1902, the Rapid Motor Vehicle Company was founded by Max Grabowsky and Morris Grabowsky who built one-ton carrying capacity trucks in Pontiac, Michigan. In 1913, the Galion Allsteel Body Company, an early developer of the pickup and dump truck, built and installed hauling boxes on slightly modified Ford Model T chassis, and from 1917, on the Model TT. Seeking part of this market share, Dodge introduced a 3/4-ton pickup with a cab and body constructed entirely of wood in 1924. In 1925, Ford followed up with a steel-bodied half-ton based on the Model T with an adjustable tailgate and heavy-duty rear springs. Billed as the "Ford Model T Runabout with Pickup Body," it sold for US$281; 34,000 were built. In 1928, it was replaced by the Model AA, which had a closed-cab, safety-glass windshield, roll-up side windows, and three-speed transmission.

In 1931, General Motors introduced light-duty pickups for both GMC and Chevrolet targeted at private ownership. These pickup trucks were based on the Chevrolet Master. In 1940, GM introduced the dedicated light-truck platform, separate from passenger cars, which GM named the AK series. Ford North America continued to offer a pickup body style on the Ford Model 51, and the Ford Australian division produced the first Australian "ute" in 1932. In 1940, Ford offered a dedicated light-duty truck platform, then upgraded the platform after World War II to the Ford F-Series in 1948.

Dodge at first assumed heavier truck production from Graham-Paige, while the company produced their light (pickup) trucks, initially on their sufficiently sturdy passenger car frames. But after switching to distinct, dedicated truck frames in 1936, Dodge/Fargo launched an extensive own truck range for 1939, marketed as the "Job-Rated" trucks. These Art Deco–styled trucks were again continued after World War II.

International Harvester offered the International K and KB series, which were marketed towards construction and farming and did not have a strong retail consumer presence, and Studebaker also manufactured the M-series truck. At the beginning of World War II, the United States government halted the production of privately owned pickup trucks, and all American manufacturers built heavy duty trucks for the war effort.

In the 1950s, consumers began purchasing pickups for lifestyle rather than utilitarian reasons. Car-like, smooth-sided, fenderless trucks were introduced, such as the Chevrolet Fleetside, the Chevrolet El Camino, the Dodge Sweptline, and in 1957, Ford's purpose-built Styleside. Pickups began to feature comfort items such as power options and air conditioning. During this time, pickups with four doors, known as crew cabs, started to become popular. These pickup trucks were released in 1954 in Japan with the Toyota Stout, in 1957 in Japan with the Datsun 220, and in 1957 in America with the International Travelette. Other manufacturers soon followed, including the Hino Briska in 1962, Dodge in 1963, Ford in 1965, and General Motors in 1973.

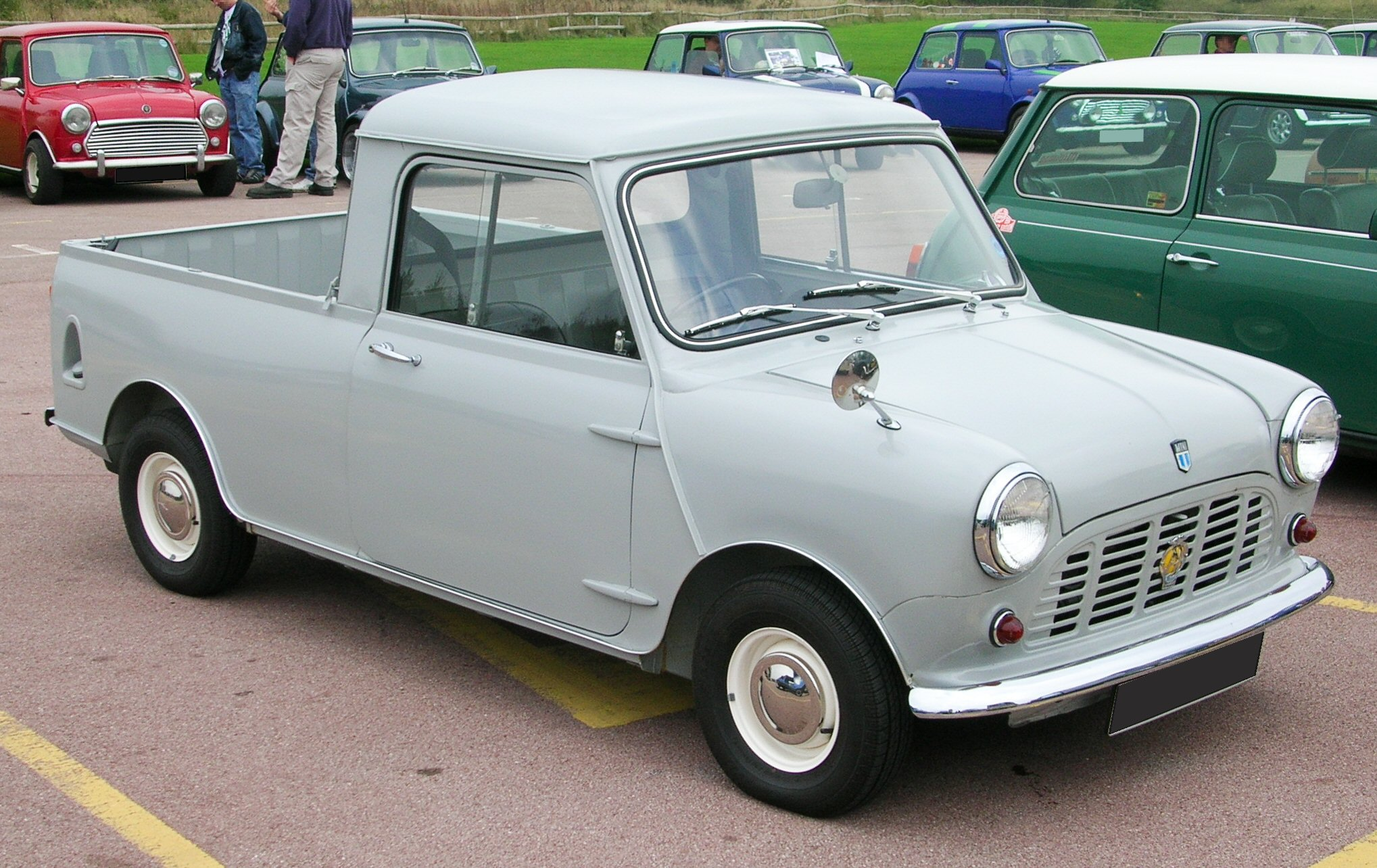
Mini Pick-up

In 1961, in the UK, the British Motor Corporation launched an Austin Mini Pickup version of the original 1959 Mini. It was in production until 1983. In 1963, the US chicken tax directly curtailed the import of the Volkswagen Type 2, distorting the market in favor of US manufacturers. The tariff directly affected any country seeking to bring light trucks into the United States and effectively "squeezed smaller Asian truck companies out of the American pickup market." Over the intervening years, Detroit lobbied to protect the light-truck tariff, thereby reducing pressure on Detroit to introduce vehicles that polluted less and that offered increased fuel economy.

The US government's 1973 Corporate Average Fuel Economy (CAFE) policy set higher fuel-economy requirements for cars than pickups. CAFE led to the replacement of the station wagon by the minivan, the latter of which belonged in the truck category, which allowed it to comply with less strict emissions standards. Eventually, CAFE led to the promotion of sport utility vehicles (SUVs). Pickups, unhindered by the emissions controls regulations on cars, began to replace muscle cars as the performance vehicle of choice. The Dodge Warlock appeared in Dodge's "adult toys" line, along with the Macho Power Wagon and Street Van. The 1978 gas guzzler tax, which taxed fuel-inefficient cars while exempting pickup trucks, further distorted the market in favor of pickups. Furthermore, until 1999, light trucks were not required to meet the same safety standards as cars, and 20 years later, most still lagged behind cars in the adoption of safety features.

In the 1980s, the compact Mazda B-series, Isuzu Faster, and Mitsubishi Forte debuted. Subsequently, US manufacturers built their compact pickups for the domestic market, including the Ford Ranger, and the Chevrolet S-10. Minivans subsequently made inroads into the pickups' market share. In the 1990s, pickups' market share was further eroded by the growing popularity of SUVs.

Mid-sized electric trucks had been tried early in the 20th century but soon lost out to gasoline and diesel vehicles. In 1997, the Chevrolet S-10 EV was released, but few were sold, and those were mostly to fleet operators. After the development of vehicle-scale lithium-ion batteries, electric pickups returned to commercial production, including the Ford F-150 Lightning, Toyota Hilux BEV, and Tesla Cybertruck.

By 2023, pickup trucks had become strictly more lifestyle than utilitarian vehicles. Annual surveys of Ford F-150 owners from 2012 to 2021 revealed that 87% of the owners used their trucks frequently for shopping and running errands and 70% for pleasure driving, whereas 28% used their trucks often for personal hauling (41% occasionally and 32% rarely/never) and only 7% used them for towing while 29% only did so occasionally and 63% rarely/never did. The 1960s–1970s Ford F-100 was typically a regular cab and consisted of mostly 64% bed and 36% cab, while by mid-2000s, crew cabs were largely becoming the norm and the bed was shrunk to accommodate the larger cab, and a 2023 F-150 consisted of 63% cab and 37% bed.

== International markets ==
While the Ford F-150 has been the best-selling vehicle in the United States since 1982, the Ford F-150, or indeed any full-sized pickup truck, is a rare sight in Europe, where higher fuel prices and narrower city roads make it difficult to use daily. In the United States, pickups are favored by a cultural attachment to the style, lower fuel prices, and taxes and regulations that distort the market in favor of domestically built trucks. As of 2016, the IRS offers tax breaks for business use of "any vehicle equipped with a cargo area ... of at least six feet in interior length that is not readily accessible from the passenger compartment".

In Europe, pickups represent less than 1% of light vehicles sold, the most popular being the Ford Ranger with 27,300 units sold in 2015. Other models include the Renault Alaskan (a rebadged Nissan Navara), and the Toyota Hilux.

In China (where it is known by the English loanword as 皮卡車 or 皮卡车 (pí kǎ chē), the Great Wall Wingle is manufactured domestically and exported to Australia. In Thailand, pickups manufactured for local sale and export include the Isuzu D-Max and the Mitsubishi Triton. In Latin and South America, the Toyota Hilux, Ford Ranger, Volkswagen Amarok, Dodge Ram, Chevrolet S-10, Chevrolet D-20, and Chevrolet Montana are sold.

In South Africa, pickups account for about 17% of the passenger and light commercial vehicle sales, mostly the Toyota Hilux, Ford Ranger, and Isuzu KB (Isuzu D-Max). The Volkswagen Amarok and Nissan Navara are also sold.

== Design and features ==
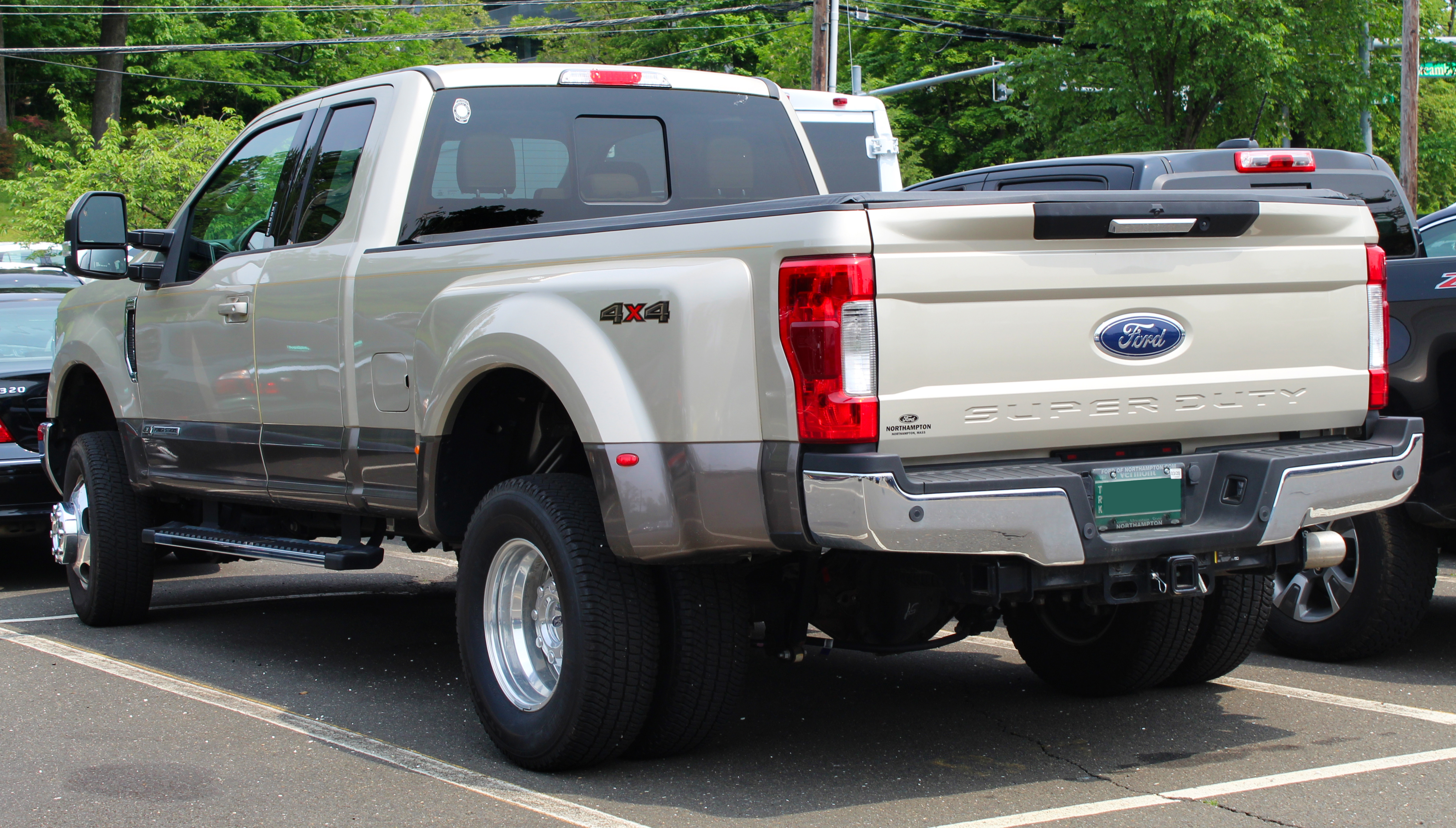
A Ford F-350 with four rear wheels (a "dually") and an extended cab with rear-hinged doors

In the United States and Canada, nearly all new pickups are sold with automatic transmissions. Only the Jeep Gladiator and the Toyota Tacoma are available with manual transmissions.

A regular cab, single cab or standard cab, has a single row of seats and a single set of doors, one on each side.

Extended cab or extra cab pickups add an extra space behind the main seat, sometimes including smaller jump seats which can fold out of the way to create more storage space. The first extended-cab truck in the United States was called the Club Cab and was introduced by Chrysler in 1973 on its Dodge D-series pickup trucks. Extended-cab trucks either have just a single set of doors with no direct access to the extended portion of the cab, very small (half-sized) rear doors that are rear-hinged which can only be opened after the front doors are open, or small (three-quarter-sized) front-hinged doors.

A crew cab, or double cab, seats five or six and has four full-sized, front-hinged doors. The first crew-cab truck in the United States was made by International Harvester in 1957 and was later followed by Dodge in 1963, Ford in 1965, and Chevrolet in 1973. However, they were originally available only with three-quarter-ton or one-ton models (such as Ford F-250/F-350), while half-ton trucks like Ford F-150 would not become available in four-door configuration until 2001, by which time crew cabs also started overtaking regular/extended cabs in popularity.

Cab-over designs have the cab sitting above the front axle, with cab forward designs having the steering wheel center point located in the first front quartile of the vehicle. These arrangements allow a longer cargo area for the same overall length. An early cab-over, drop-sided pickup was the Volkswagen Transporter, introduced in 1952. This configuration is more common among European and Japanese manufacturers than in North America. The design was more popular in North America in the 1950s and 1960s, with examples including the Chevrolet Corvair Rampside and Loadside, Dodge A-100 and A-108, Ford Econoline, and Jeep FC-150 and FC-170. The electric Telo MT1 is a modern take on the cab forward design, with the front footwells of the cab located near the front axle and no traditional nose.

A "dually" is a North American colloquial term for a pickup with four rear wheels instead of two, able to carry more weight over the rear axle. Vehicles similar to the pickup include the coupé utility, a car-based pickup, and the larger sport utility truck (SUT), based on a sport utility vehicle (SUV).

The terms half-ton, three-quarter-ton, and one-ton are remnants from a time when the number referred to the maximum cargo capacity by weight.

In North America, some pickup trucks may be marketed as heavy duty (eg Ram Heavy Duty), super duty (eg Ford Super Duty) or simply "HD". This is typically a pickup truck with higher payload and/or towing capabilities than is standard for their size. While synonymous with "dually" or full-size pickup trucks in North American, none of those are requirements. Dually is not available on Ram 2500 or Ford F-250 and is optional on Ram 3500 or Ford F-350, but those pickup trucks are all heavy duty. Mahindra Bolero MaXX Pik-Up HD is a heavy duty mid-size pickup truck with a two tonne payload.

Some pickup trucks have an opening at the rear of the cab to increase cargo capacity lengthwise without increasing overall vehicle length or wheelbase, which reduces break over, approach, departure angles and increases turning radius. This feature is referred to as a mid-gate due to it being located in the middle of a pickup truck, as opposed to the tail-gate, which is located as the rear/tail of the vehicle.

=== Bed styles ===
Chevrolet C/K (first generation), Stepside and Fleetside comparison

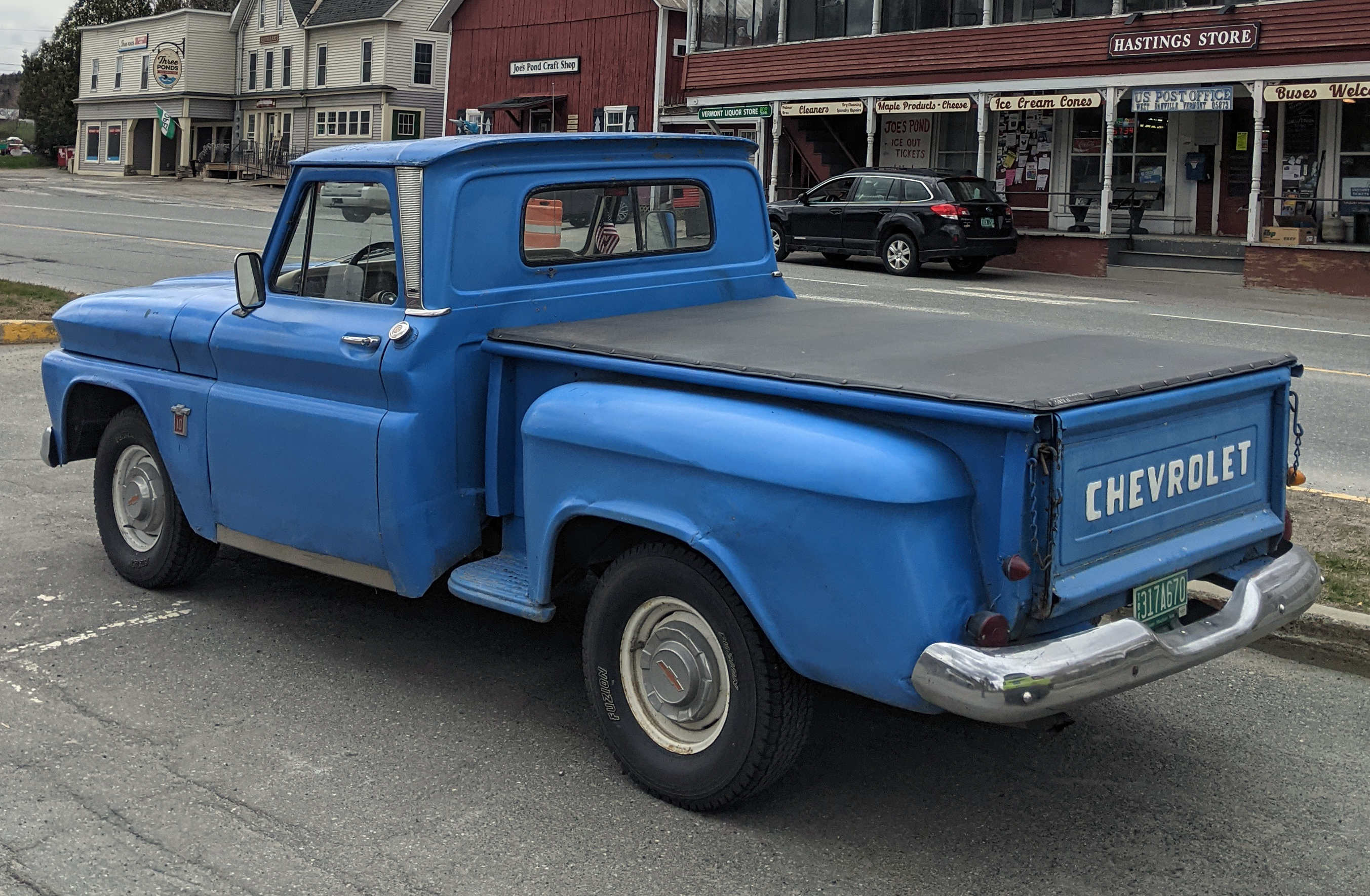
Stepside (1964)

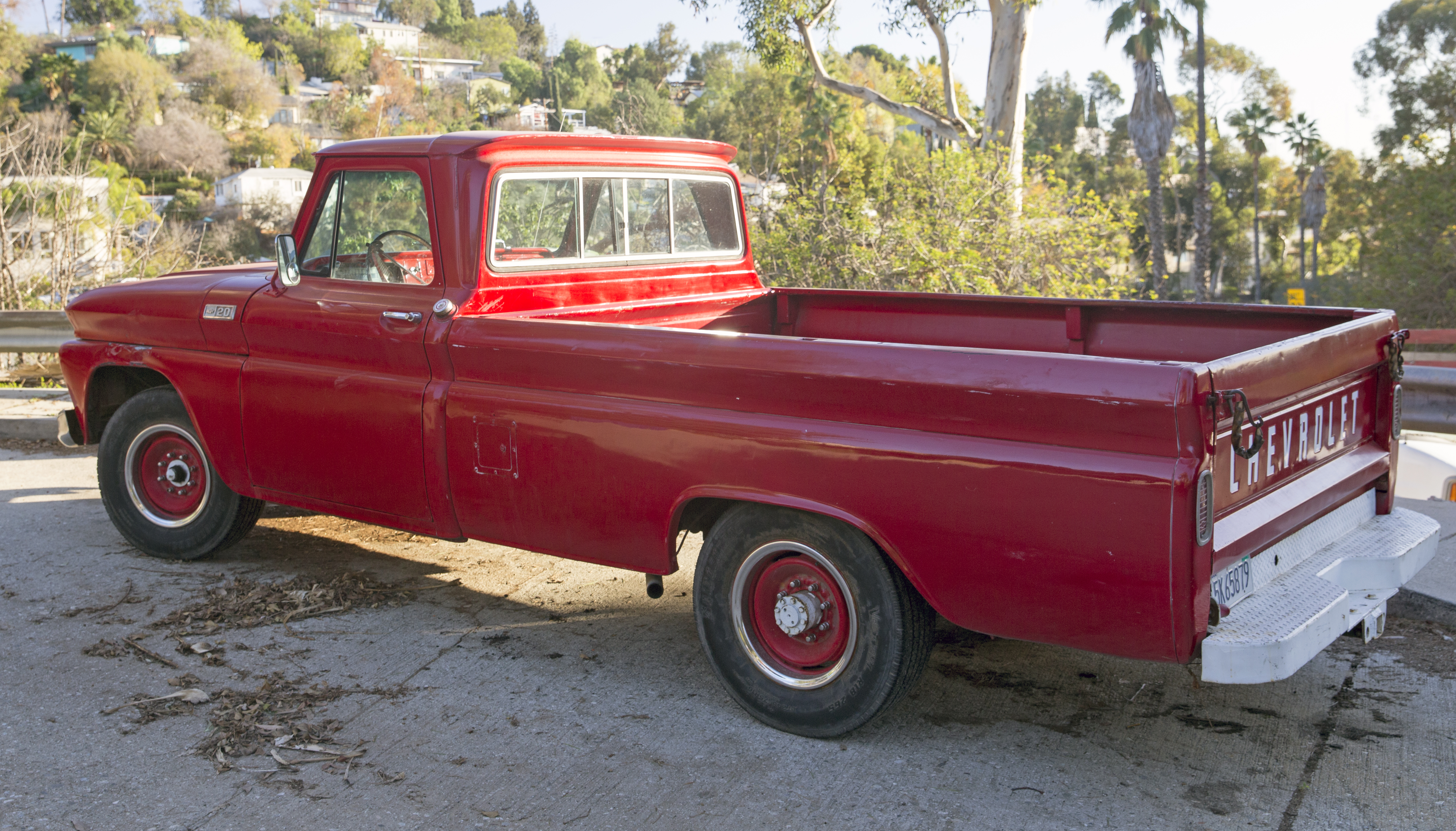
Fleetside (1965)

The cargo bed can vary in size according to whether the vehicle is optimized for cargo utility or passenger comfort. Most have fixed side walls and a hinged tailgate. Cargo beds are normally found in two styles: stepside or fleetside. A stepside bed has fenders that extend on the outside of the cargo area; originally these were just fenders attached to a cargo box. This style used to be the standard design, as it was cheaper to manufacture. A fleetside bed has wheel wells inside of a double-walled bed, and most are usually designed to match the cab's styling. The two types of bed have been given a variety of names by different manufacturers; "Stepside" and "Fleetside" originate with Chevrolet but are also frequently used by Dodge as well as GMC. GMC has also used "Wideside" instead of Fleetside, while Dodge has also used "Utiline" and "Sweptline" for the two types. Ford uses "Flareside" and "Styleside", respectively. Jeep has used "Sportside" and "Thriftside" for the separate fender style, and "Townside" for flush designs. International Harvester called the two types "Standard" and "Bonus-Load".

The first fleet-sided pickup truck was the Crosley in the 1940s, followed by the 1955 Chevrolet Cameo Carrier. Early pickups had wood-plank beds, which were largely replaced by steel by the 1960s. In many parts of the world, pickups frequently use a dropside bed – with a flat tray with hinged panels that can be raised separately on the sides and the rear. The fleetside has gradually fully replaced the earlier, separate-fender look: The last time Chevrolet and GMC used the Stepside style was on the 2005 Silverado and Sierra 1500 models; Ford last used the Flareside style on the 2009 F-150.

== Safety ==
Consumer pickup trucks sold in the US have increased in weight by 32% since 1990. Also, cabins have grown and risen further from the ground and grille and hood sizes have increased over time. These changes mean that a modern standard pickup truck has a 2.1–3.0 m (7–10 ft) longer blind spot in front of its grille than most other vehicles as well as increased blind spots behind and to the side. The Ford F-250 has a hood almost 1.8 m (6 ft) from the ground. It may be impossible to see a small object such as a child as far as 4.6 m (15 ft) in front of the vehicle. A total of 575 children in the US died in front-over deaths between 2009 and 2019, most by their parents. This is an 89% increase in mortality from the previous ten years. Additionally, US car-related fatalities went up by 8% and pedestrian casualties increased by 46% between 2011 and 2021. While the reasons for this increase are complex, Consumer Reports partially attributes this number to increased truck size and prevalence. Chuck Farmer from the US Insurance Institute for Highway Safety has found large pickup trucks to be as deadly or deadlier than muscle cars and "... are work trucks, and people should not be using them primarily for commuting, because they kill so many other drivers."

Riding in the bed of a pickup truck is prohibited in some countries and jurisdictions, or is permitted only under narrow circumstances. Some countries and jurisdictions also have prohibitions or regulations on transporting unsecured animals in the bed of a pickup truck.

== Uses ==
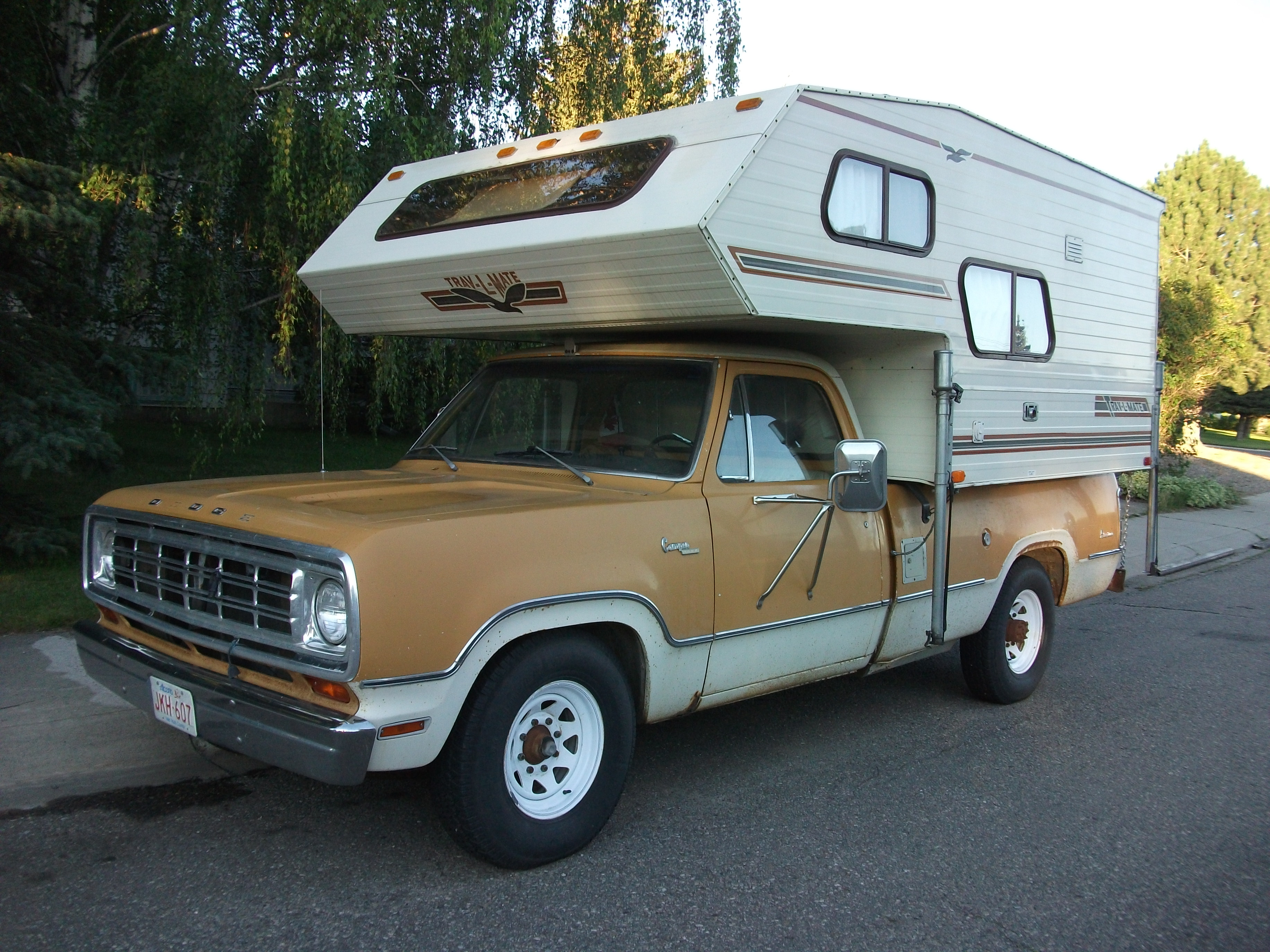
1974 Dodge D200 with camper

In the United States and Canada, pickups are used primarily for passenger transport. Pickup trucks are often marketed and used for their hauling (utilizing cargo bed) and towing (utilizing body-on-frame design and long wheelbase) capabilities.

Equipping pickup trucks with a camper shell provides a small space for camping. Slide-in truck campers can offer a pickup truck the amenities of a small motorhome, but still allow the operator the option of removal and independent use of the vehicle.

Modified pickups can be used as improvised, unarmored combat vehicles called a technical.

Pickup trucks are used to carry passengers in parts of Africa and Southeast Asia. In Thailand, most songthaews are converted pickup trucks and flatbed trucks. In Haiti, tap taps are also converted pickup trucks.

Towing with pickup trucks is separated into two categories: conventional towing (bumper pull) and in-bed (heavy duty) towing. Conventional towing mounts the hitch at the rear of the pickup truck, in-bed towing mounts the hitch directly above or in front of the rear axle. Weight distribution hitch falls under conventional towing. Fifth wheel and gooseneck fall under in-bed towing.

== Sizes ==
In the U.S., pickup trucks have grown in size and function, from workhorses to family vehicles with many technological features. By the 2010s, small pickups had nearly vanished and in the 2020s full-size trucks made up a majority of U.S. sales. Safety advocates are concerned with larger trucks' mass and driver blind spots.

=== Kei/Mini truck ===
Kei trucks are a Japanese class with a maximum length of 3,400 mm (134 in), a maximum width of 1,480 mm (58 in), a maximum height of 2,000 mm (79 in), and a maximum displacement of 660 cc (40 cu in). In some countries, mini trucks are similar to (or slightly bigger) than kei trucks. In other countries (e.g., the United States), mini trucks is a term used for a pickup smaller than a full-size design.

UTVs are of similar size and serve similar roles in developed countries but are typically restricted to off-road and rural areas.

=== Compact pickup truck ===
In current production, compact pickup trucks utilize unibody construction, sharing chassis architecture with a compact SUV or a compact passenger car. Examples include the Hyundai Santa Cruz and Ford Maverick. Subaru also produced the Subaru Baja, based heavily on the Subaru Outback (Legacy) wagon, and Subaru BRAT, based on the Subaru Leone wagon, using a unibody construction. Other variations include the Holden Crewman and Holden One Tonner which are based on a sedan platform, but use a part-monocoque, part chassis frame construction.

=== Mid-size pickup truck ===
Typically, mid-size pickup trucks use body-on-frame construction, often sharing design with a mid-size SUV. Examples include the Ford Ranger, Toyota Hilux, and Isuzu D-Max. This is usually the largest size pickup sold or manufactured in countries outside North America.

=== Full-size pickup truck ===
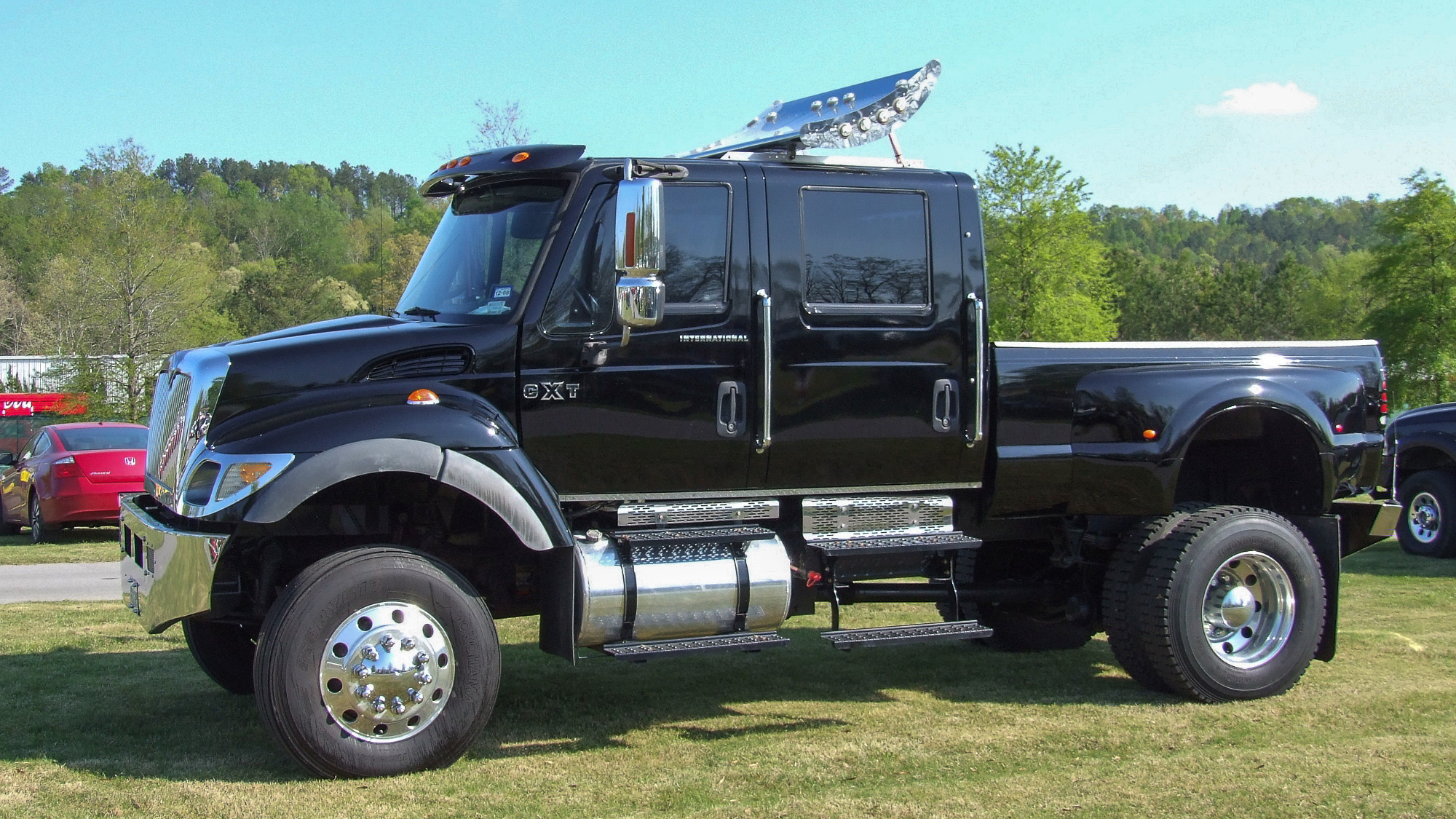
2004-2008 International CXT, the largest mass-produced pickup truck ever built.

Full-size pickup trucks are traditionally defined as body-on-frame pickup trucks with an exterior body width of at least 79 inches (2 m)(excluding mirrors and/or widebody/flares for dually wheels). Examples include the Ford F-Series, Chevrolet Silverado/GMC Sierra, Tesla Cybertruck, and Toyota Tundra.

There is no clear definition for what is too large to be a pickup truck. Most of the time the line is drawn where the features or target market of a truck no longer primarily serve private owners (e.g. Ford F-550 and larger), or a CDL (commercial driver's license) is required. Examples of exceptions include the International XT, the Unimog 437, and conversions of heavy-duty prime mover trucks.

== Gallery ==
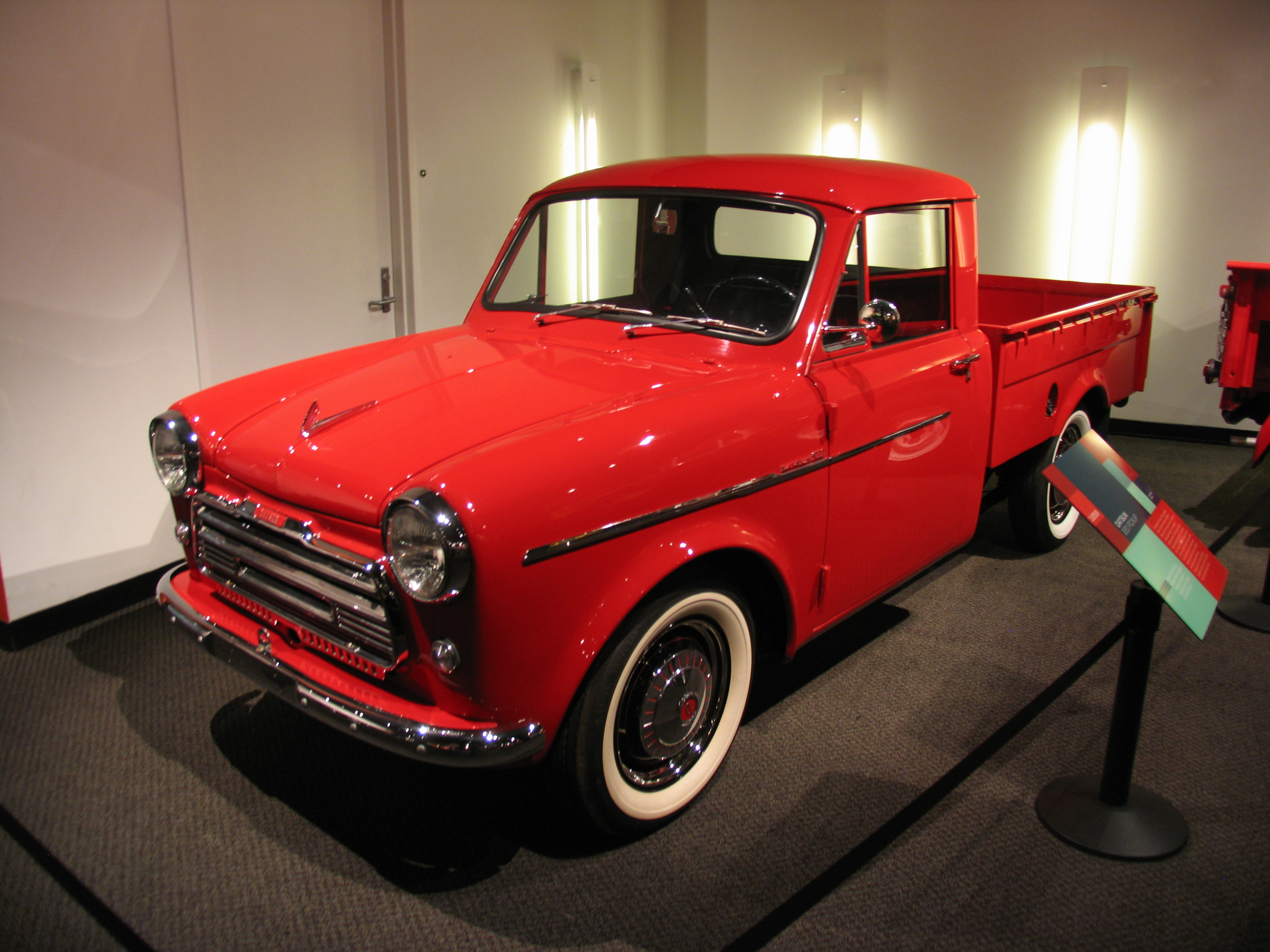
Early compact Datsun Truck

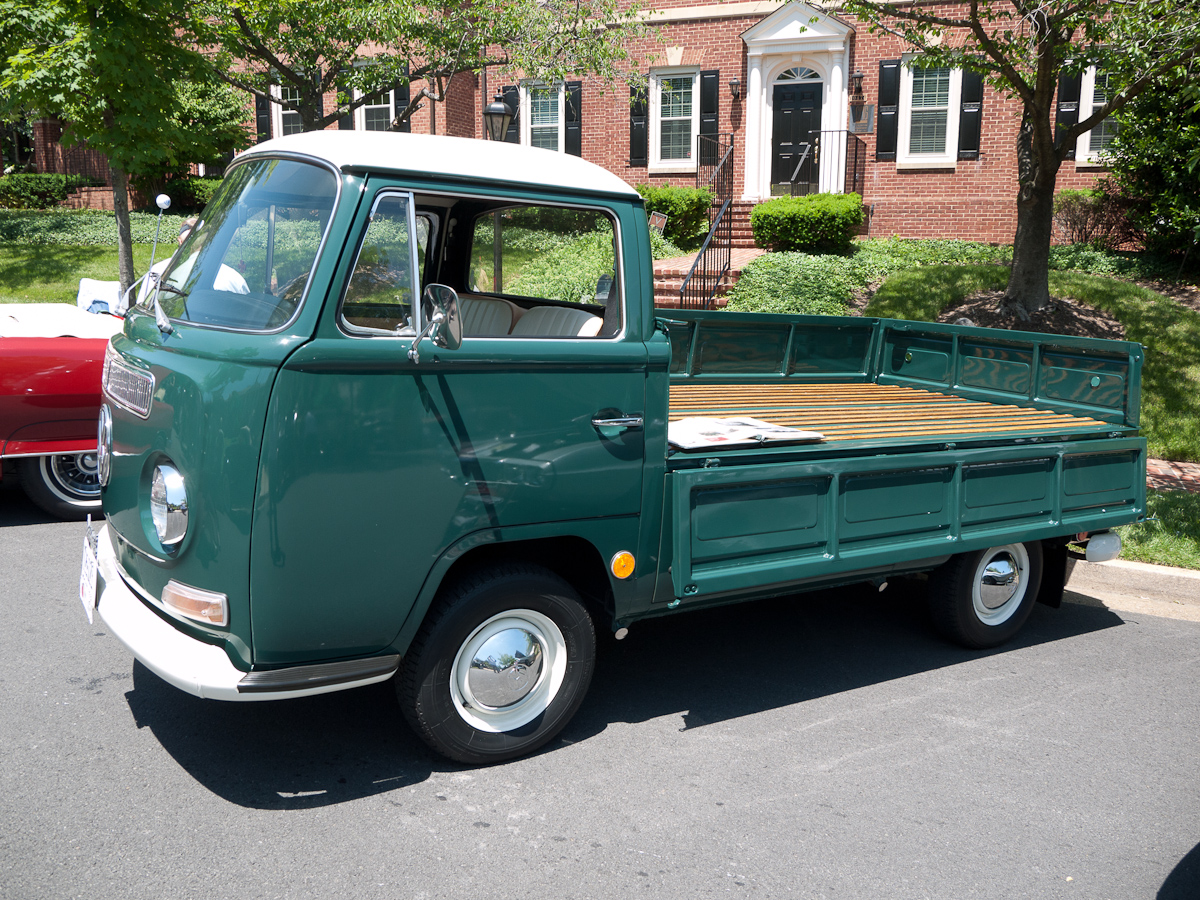
Volkswagen Type 2 with single cab over and a drop side bed with the left panel folded down

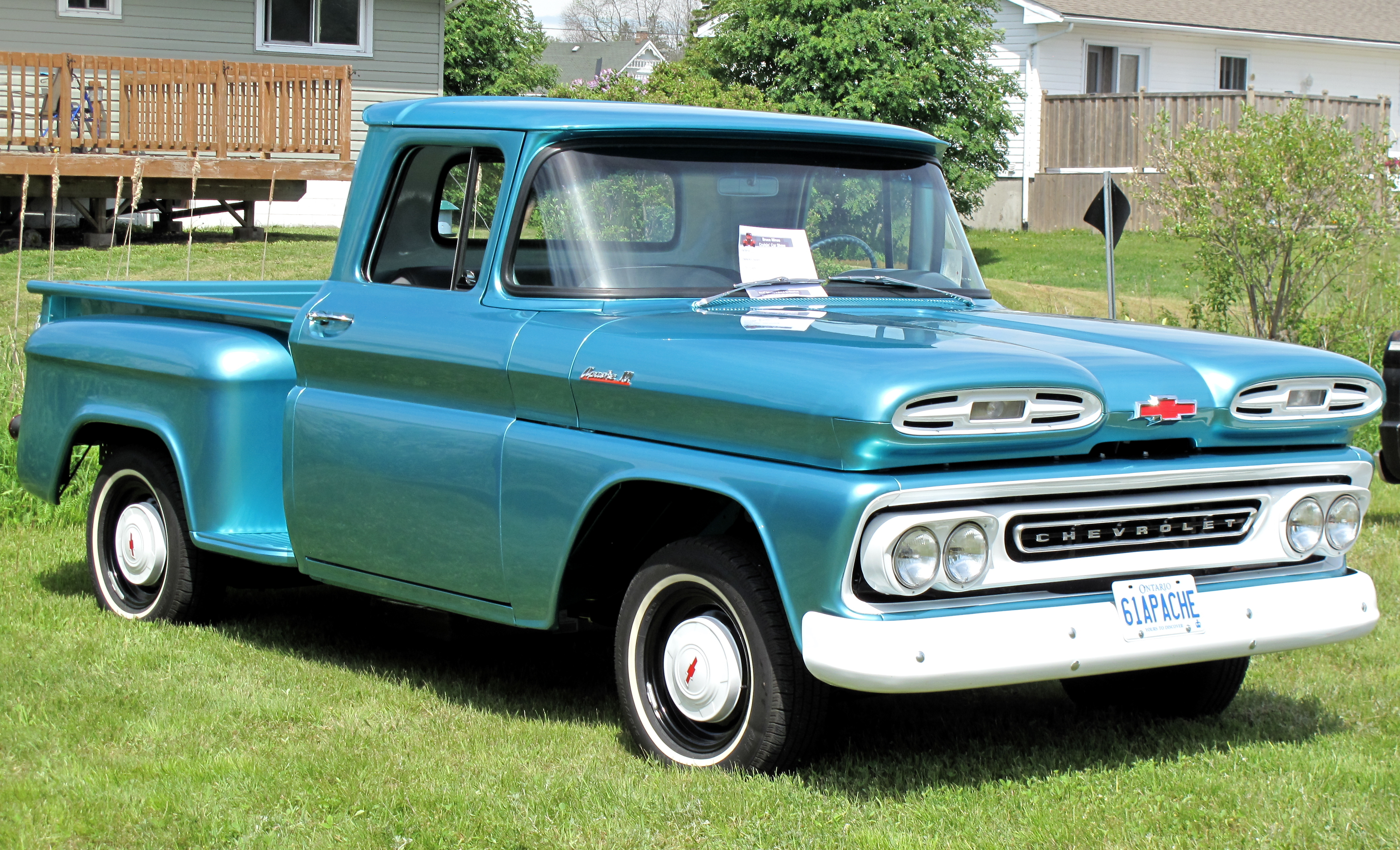
1961 Chevrolet Apache with a step-side bed

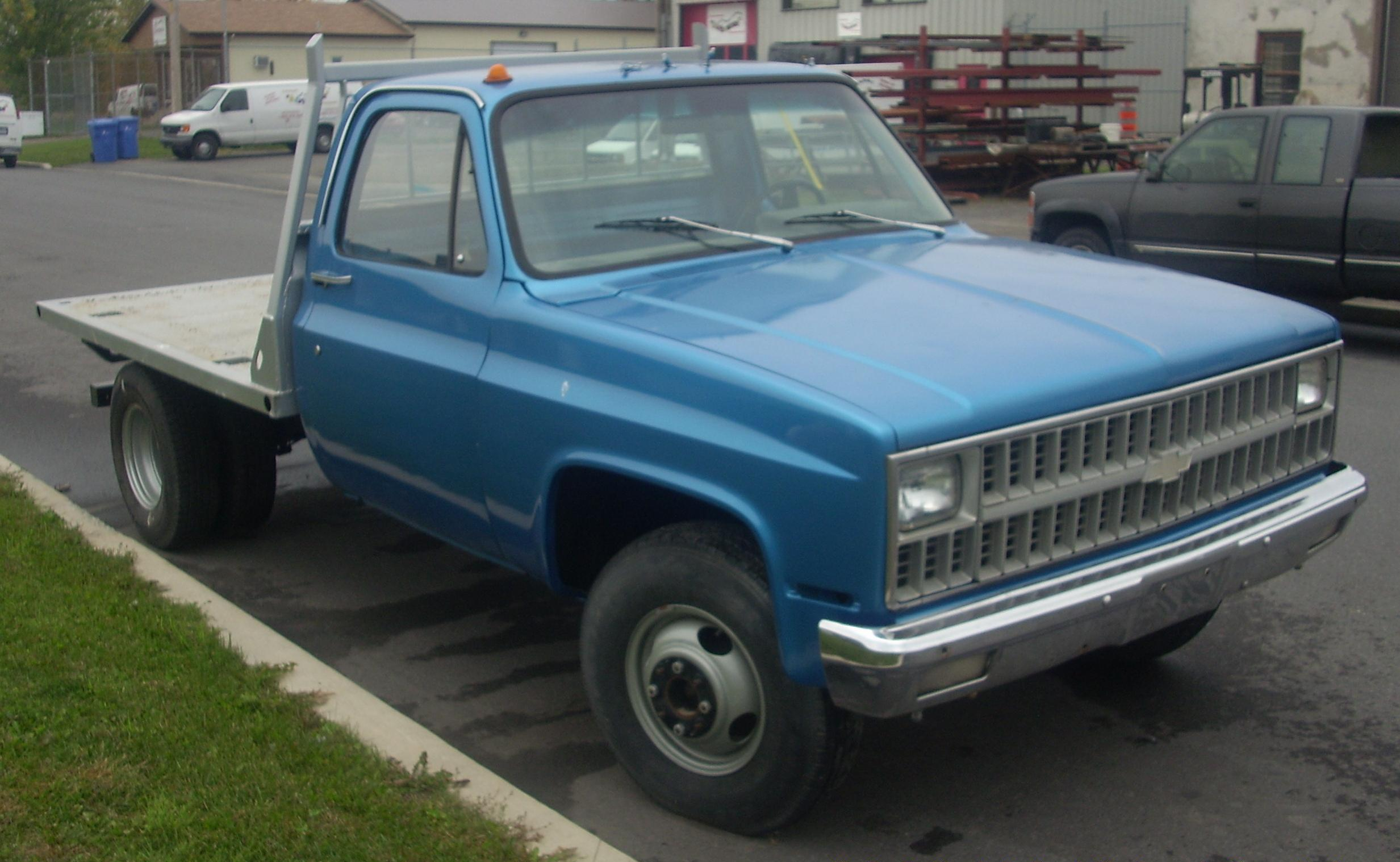
Chevrolet flatbed with four wheels on the rear axle ("dually") for improved towing

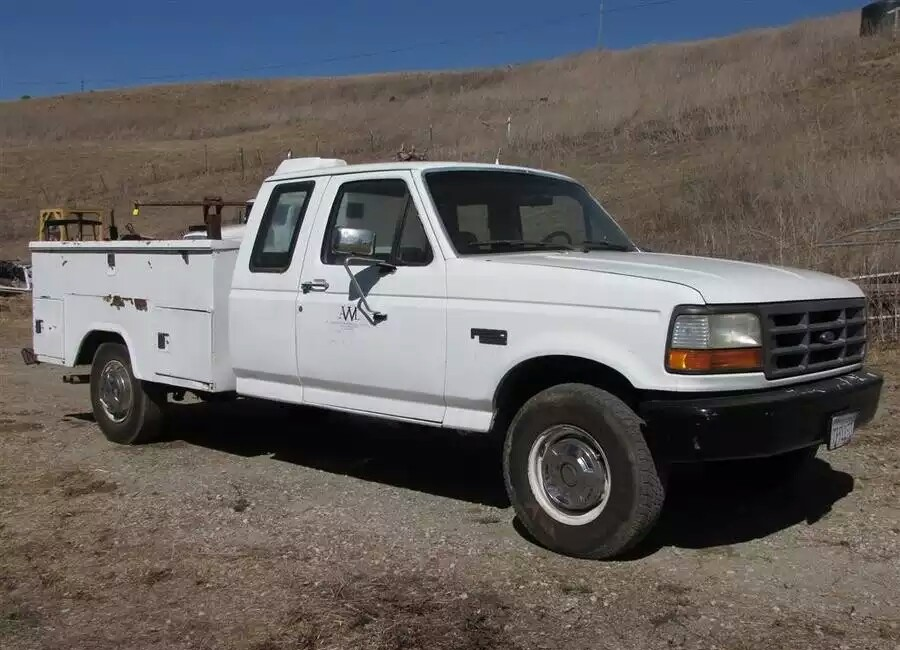
Ford F-250 extended cab fitted with an aftermarket utility bed

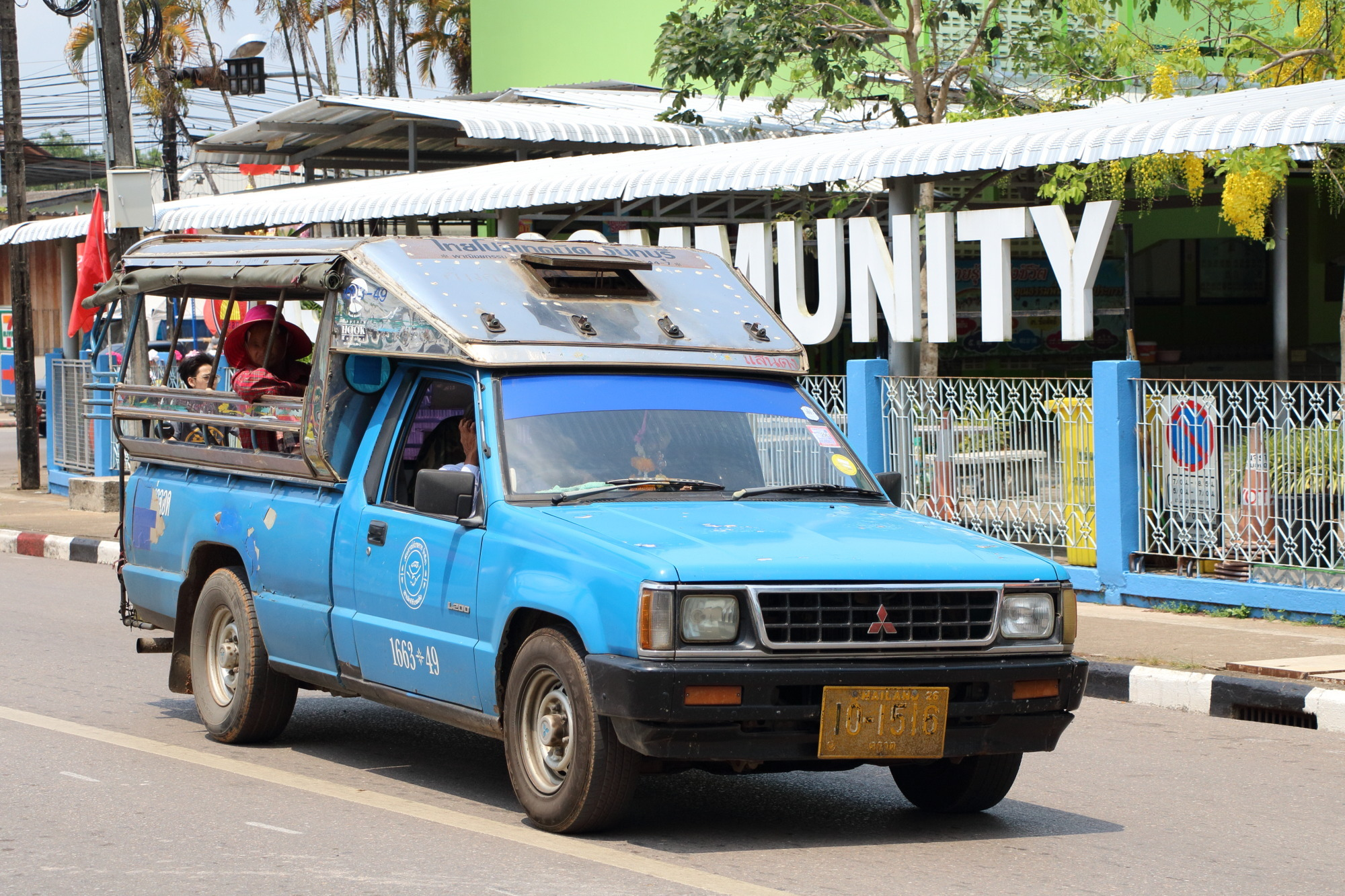
Songthaew conversion

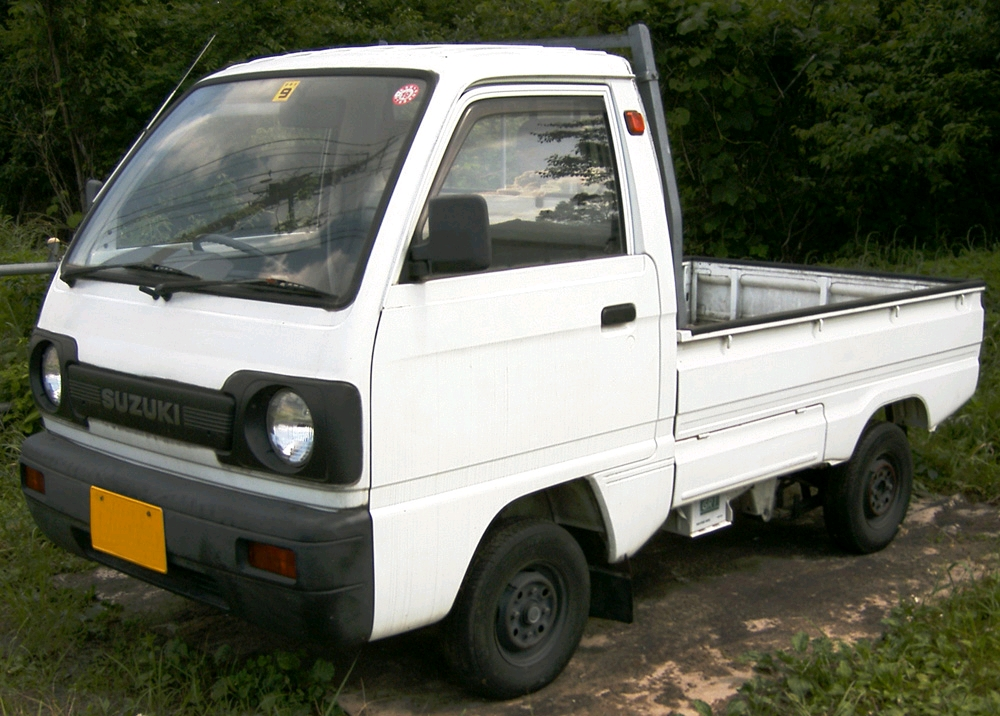
1990 Suzuki Carry, a Kei truck

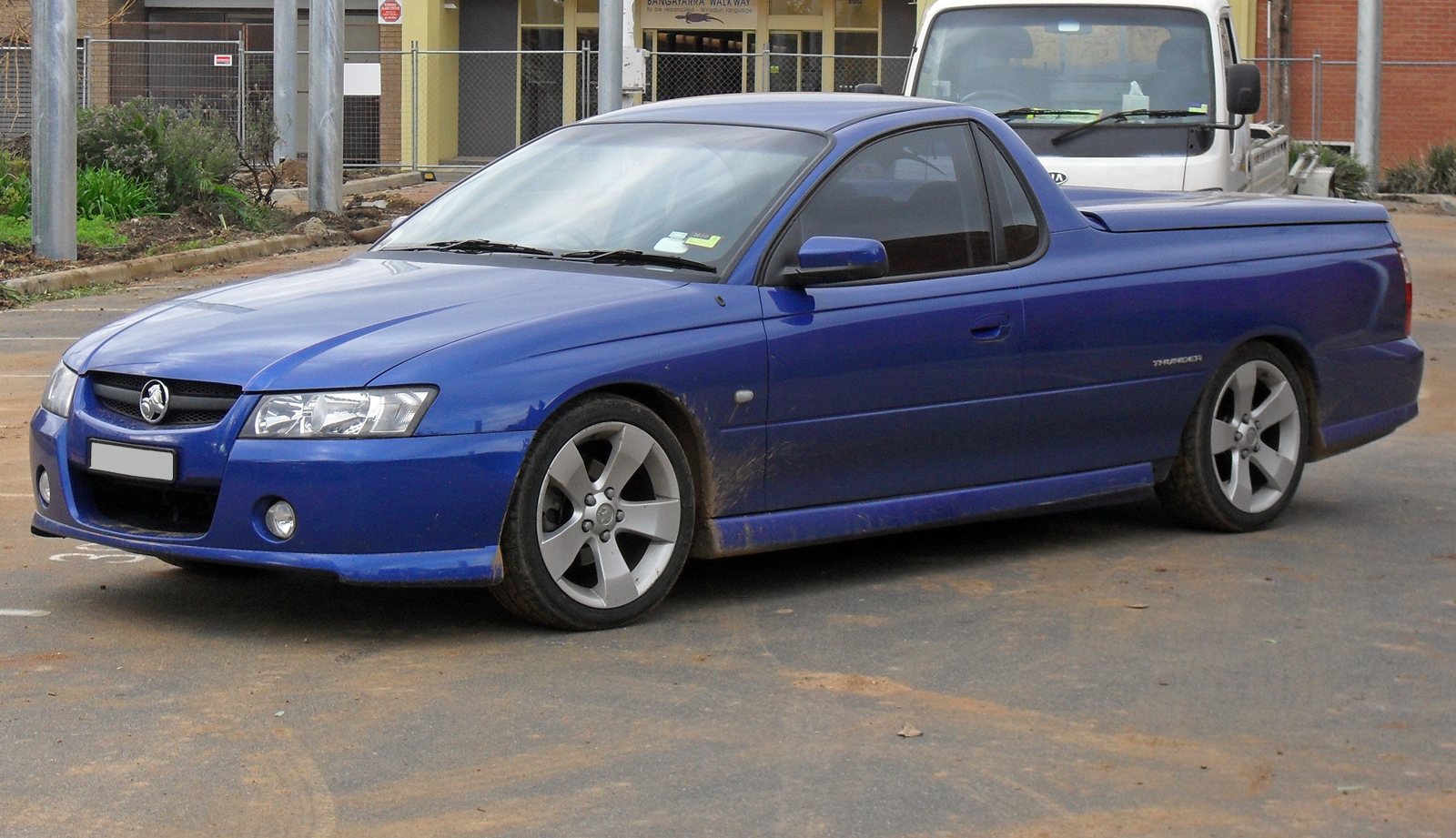
2006 Holden Ute, a car-based coupé utility

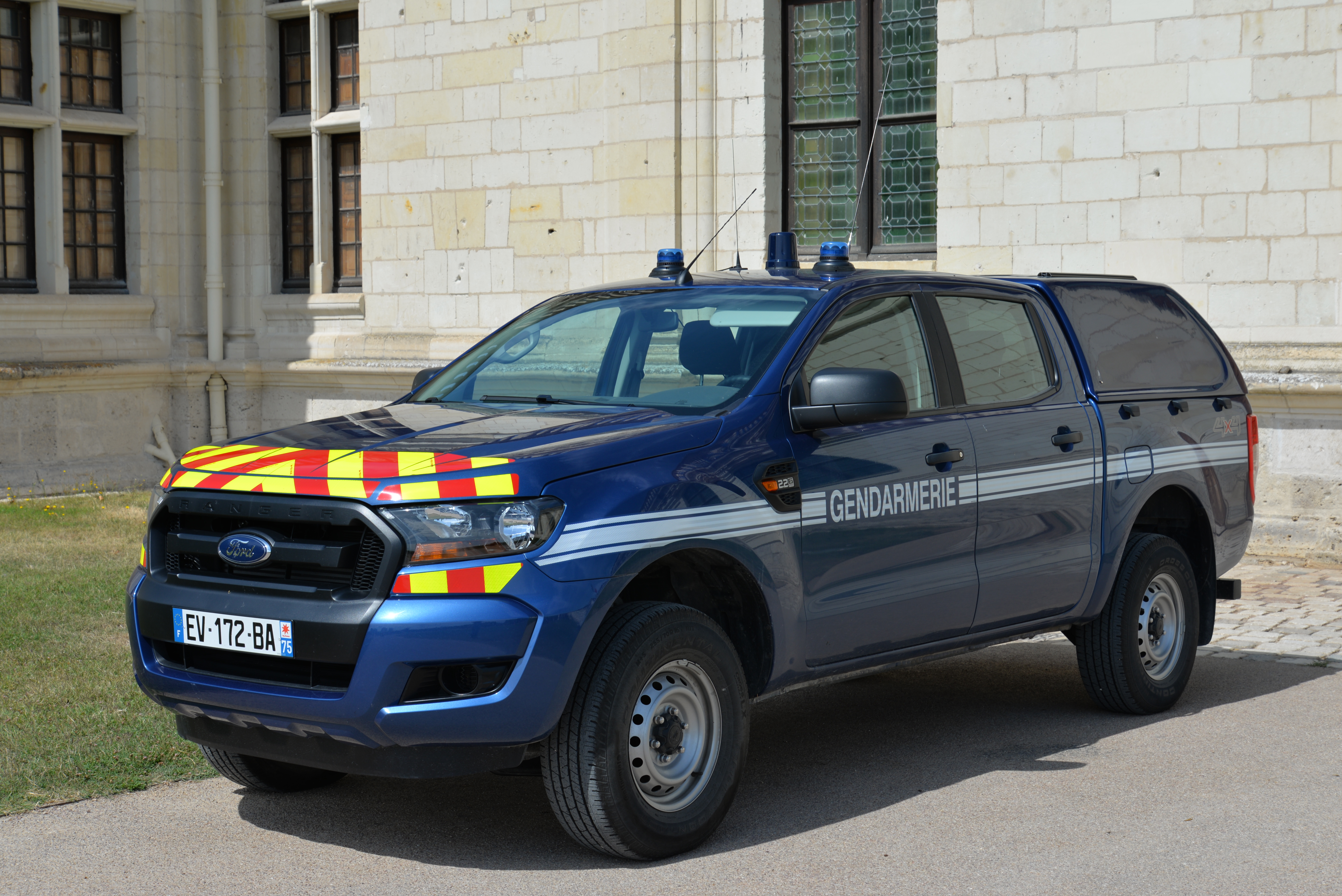
Ford Ranger double cab in French National Gendarmerie livery

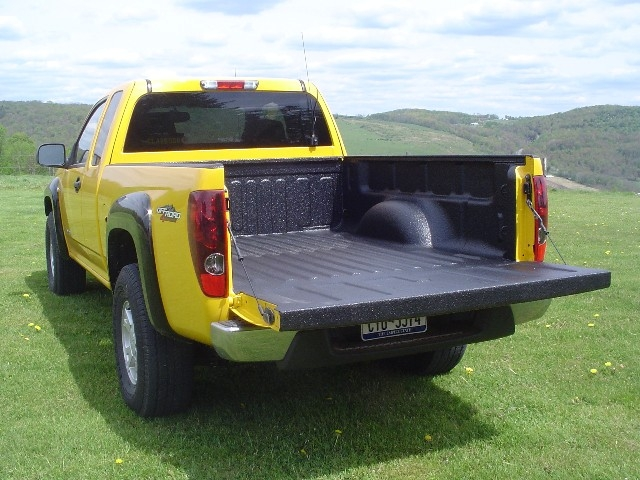
Chevrolet Colorado flat-sided pickup truck showing wheel well intrusion into bed

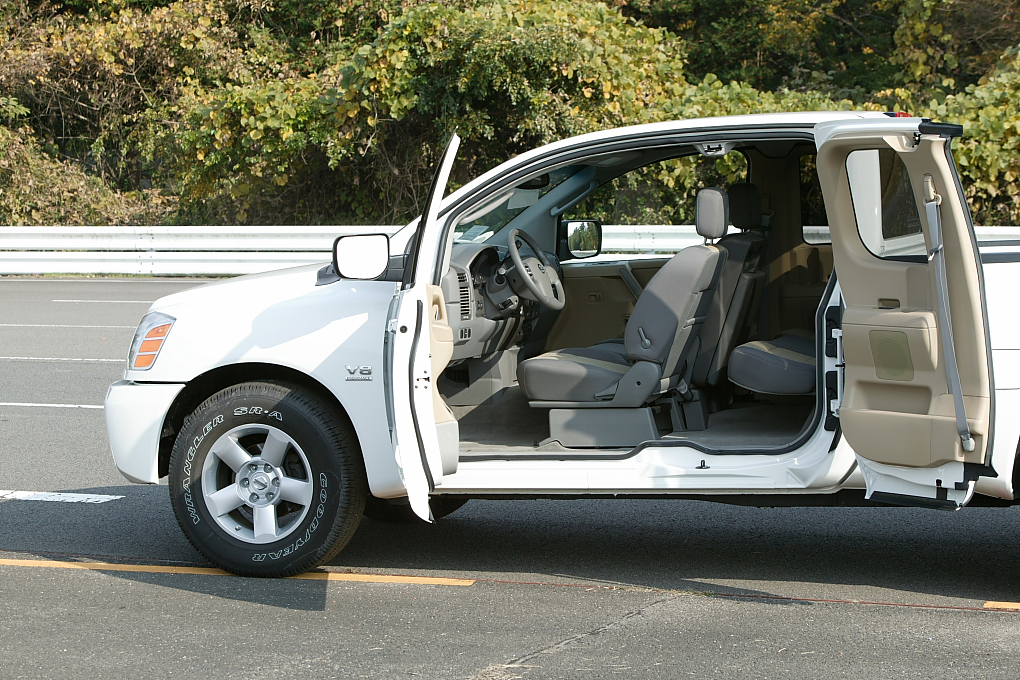
Nissan Titan showing the function of an extended cab's rear-hinged doors

== See also ==
- Chassis cab
- Cutaway van chassis
- Electric truck § Pickup trucks
- Flatbed truck
- Kei truck
- List of pickup trucks
- Pickup truck racing, a form of auto racing using modified versions of pickups mostly on oval tracks
- Roadster utility
- Rolling coal: some pickups are modified to produce more diesel exhaust.
- Self-driving truck
