= Galion Godwin Truck Body Co. =

American truck body company

Galion Godwin Truck Body Co. was named after its founding city of Galion, Ohio and was founded as early as the 1870s. Originally known as Galion Buggy Company, the business was born from demand for horse-drawn transportation. A short time after its founding, Galion Buggy Company found a market for retrofitting hauling boxes onto existing buggies. Galion soon exited the competitive buggy manufacturing market for the more lucrative aftermarket hauling beds and dump boxes. Around 1910, Galion Buggy Company changed its name to Galion Allsteel Body Company as horse-drawn buggies were gradually being replaced by motor vehicles.

== Originator of the pickup truck ==
The company is often cited as an originator of the pickup truck and an early developer of the dump truck. As early as 1913 Galion Allsteel was installing hauling boxes on slightly modified Ford model T chassis. The popularity of this combination led to the first production pickup truck by Ford in 1925. Though Ford's production model T pickup virtually eliminated the need for Galion's aftermarket boxes, Ford formed a partnership with Galion for other aftermarket equipment. Throughout the 1930s Galion Allsteel and Wood Manufacturing Co. were the only two companies who supplied Ford Motor Company with all dump beds and garbage containers for their model AA and BB chassis.

== Twentieth century ==
Galion Allsteel continued manufacturing a variety of aftermarket truck equipment throughout the 20th century. In 1950, Galion negotiated a marketing deal with All American Toy Co. who began production of "Rocky" the toy dump truck, which prominently displayed Galion logos on its sides. In 1976 Galion Allsteel was purchased by Peabody International Corporation and the name was changed to Peabody Galion. Galion remained under the ownership of Peabody and was sold to McClain Industries Inc. in 1992. The company flourished for the first few years of McClain ownership, but the company began to experience financial troubles by the late 1990s. In 2003 McClain Industries sold Galion's name and assets to competitor Godwin Manufacturing Company who now operates under the corporate umbrella of The Godwin Group. McClain Galion became Galion-Godwin Truck Body Company LLC., as it is known today.
