= Askam =

Askam may refer to:

- Askam, Cumbria, a village in Cumbria, England
- Askam (trucks), a Turkish truck manufacturer
- A village in Hanover Township, Luzerne County, Pennsylvania, United States
