= Dodge T-, V-, W-Series =

Dodge T- / V- / W-Series
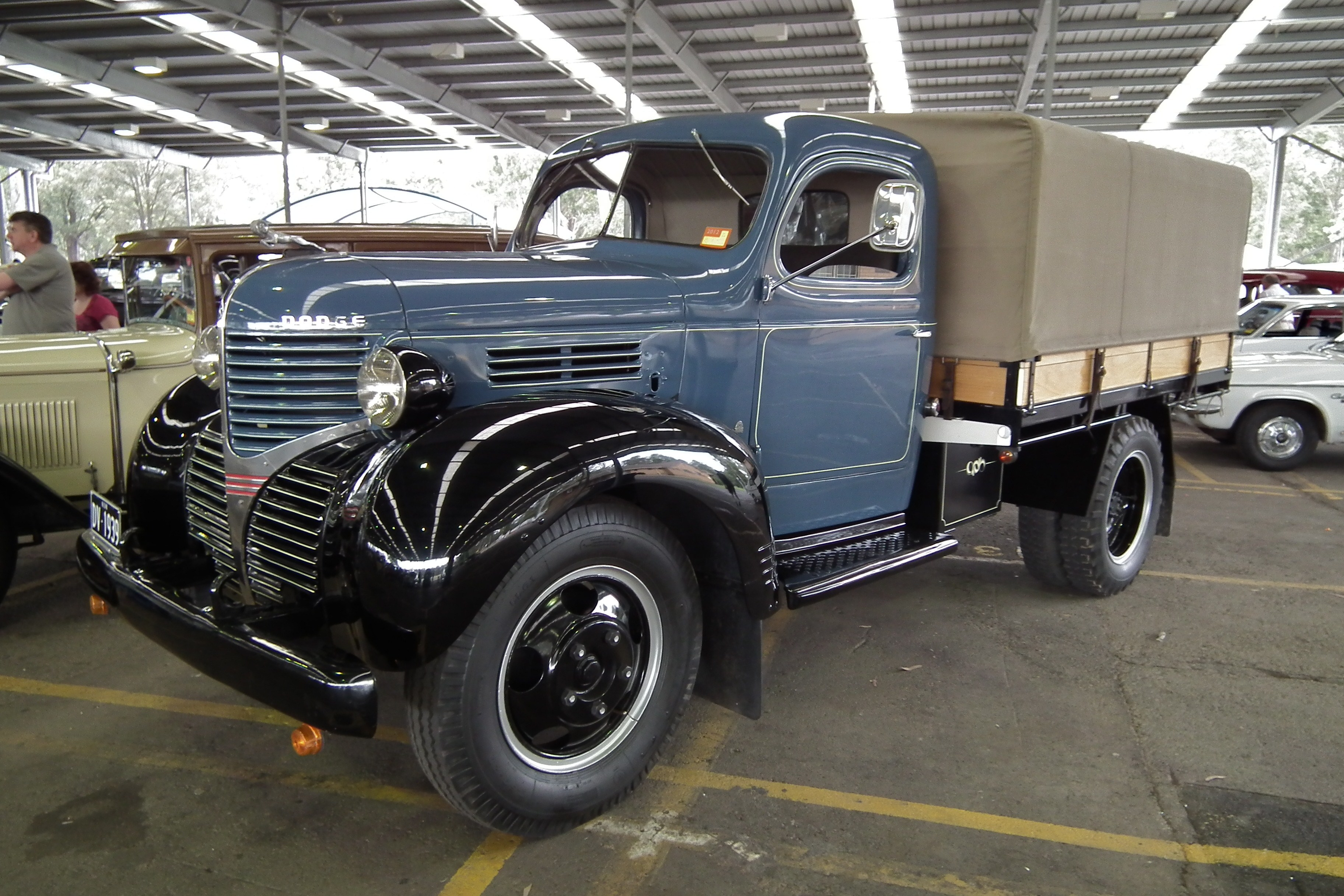
- 1939 Dodge TE32 "table top"

Overview
- Manufacturer: Dodge
- Also called: DB, DC and DD-Series (Dodge Canada); Fargo FH, FJ and FK-Series; Plymouth PT-Series
- Production: September 1938 – 1947
- Model years: 1939–1947
- Assembly: Warren, Michigan; Windsor, Ontario; Los Angeles, California; United Kingdom: Kew

Body and chassis
- Class: 1/2-ton to 1-1/2 ton rated light trucks 2-ton to 3-ton rated medium trucks
- Body style: 2-door pickup truck, cabover, flatbed, stake
- Layout: FR layout
- Related: Dodge WC series

Powertrain
- Engine: Straight-six Chrysler flathead from 201–331 cu in (3.3–5.4 L)
- Transmission: Three, four or 5-speed manual, optional 2 speed axle or 2 or 3 speed auxiliary transmission

Dimensions
- Wheelbase: 105–235 in (267–597 cm)

Chronology
- Predecessor: 1936–1938 Dodge L, M and R "Fore-Point" Trucks
- Successor: Dodge B Series

In 1939, Dodge presented a completely redesigned line of trucks. Formally the T series for 1939, V series for 1940, and the W series from 1941 through 1947, the trucks became mostly known as the Dodge Job-Rated trucks.

With streamlined, Art Deco-style front sheetmetal, and introducing the concept of "Job-Rated" truck configurations, Dodge tried to offer customers the truck that fit any job they were buying it for, literally comparing it to the process and user experience of buying shoes.

As a result, the 1939 to 1947 Dodge truck range was offered in a bewilderingly large number of available variants and model codes. Six different payload classes, a wide range of bodies, and more than twenty different wheelbase lengths were manufactured, and fitted with different sized versions of the straight six-cylinder Chrysler "Flathead" side-valve engines – from the half-ton TC pickup truck on a 116-inch wheelbase to three-ton tractor cabs. In 1940 alone, 20 different truck frames were simultaneously produced in the same year, which increased to 31 different chassis frames, for 17 wheelbase lengths in 1947.

Nevertheless, mechanically, the trucks were all very similar, with solid axles front and rear and leaf springs at all four corners. With World War II taking up most of production capacity from 1942 to 1945, the 1939 styling continued largely unchanged through 1947, as engineering and production became the main focus. The Dodge trucks enjoyed some popularity before the war, and the last of them – built in 1942, before Dodge turned to mostly military production – had progressed to the W-series model name. When commercial sales of the trucks restarted post-war, they resumed as the 1946 Dodge W-series.

Historic author on Dodge trucks, Don Bunn, noted that the 1939–1947 Job-Rated trucks represent a very significant segment in Dodge history. They were the first to be mass-produced in the new, huge (Mound Road) Warren truck plant. The Job-Rated trucks also formed the basis for Dodge's first light-duty military 4×4s, the 1940 half-ton Dodge VC series, which in turn further developed into the world's first factory four-wheel-drive commercial pickups: the Dodge Power Wagon. And lastly, Dodge was the first of the Big Three U.S. auto manufacturers to offer a diesel-powered truck. Chrysler engineered and built its heavy-duty diesel engines all in-house. Today, this series is the most popular pickups with Dodge truck collectors.

== General ==
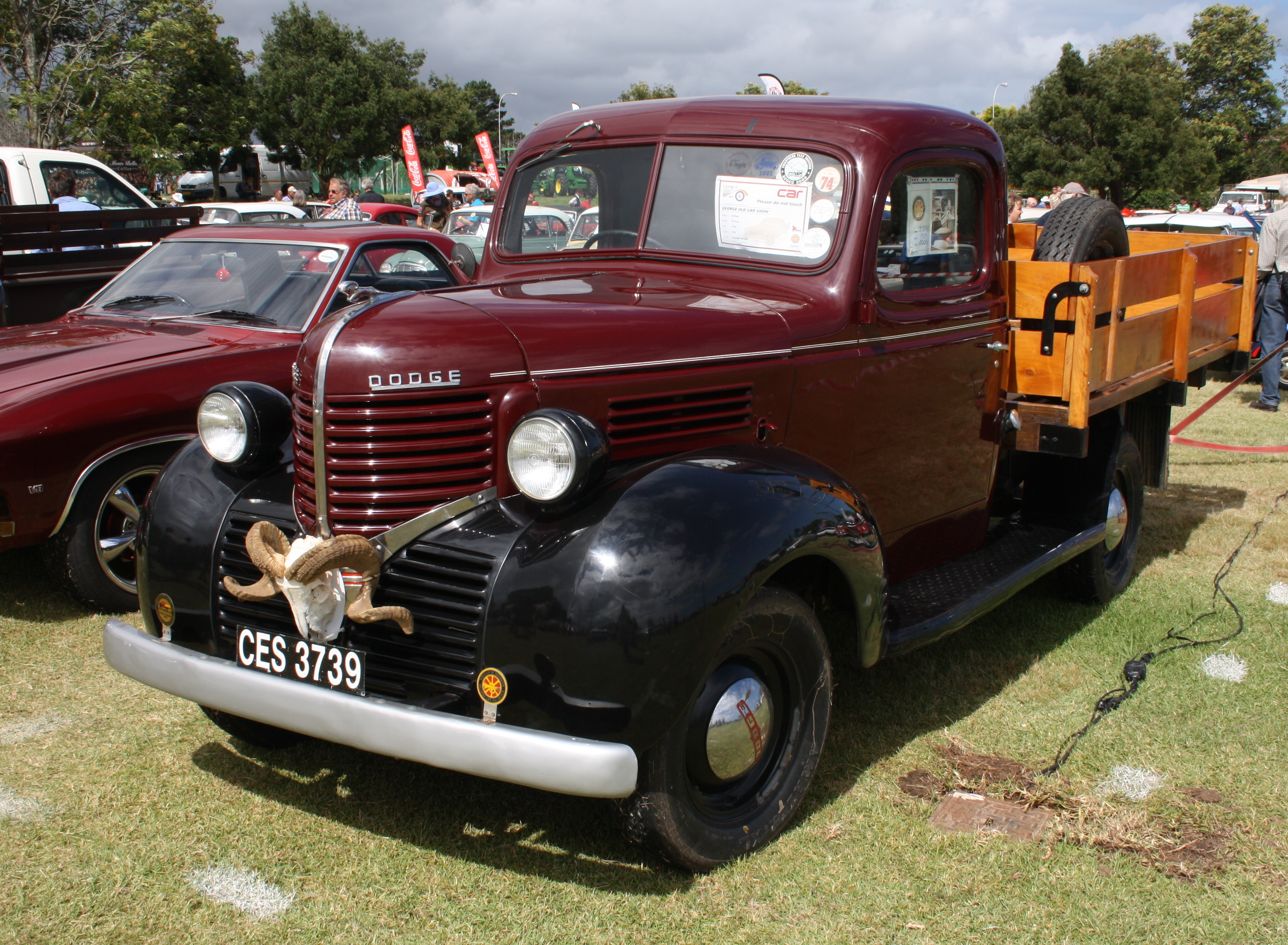
1939 Dodge Pickup with wooden bed.

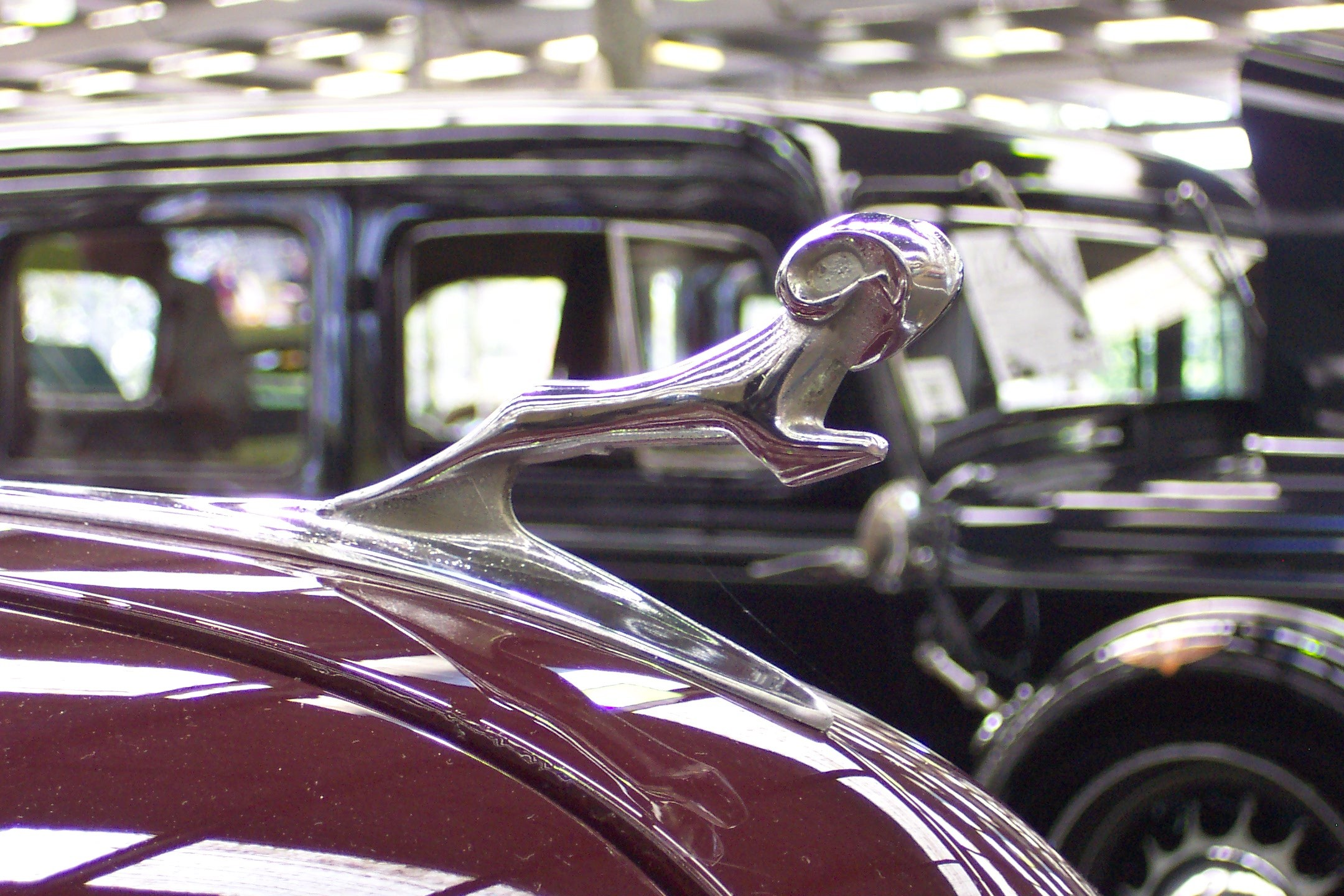
Ram hood ornaments adorned every Dodge car and truck from 1932 to 1954.

After Dodge joined forces with Graham Brothers trucks from 1925 onwards, Dodge and Graham trucks, marketed through Dodge's vast dealer network, were offered in various capacities, ranging from a half ton to three tons. In May 1928, Power Wagon magazine already computed a "truly impressive" 1,842 possible configuration combinations, of available models, styles, payload ratings, wheelbase, and other options.

For 1939, Dodge rolled out an entirely new design, except for the updated drivetrains – and offered many variants. In the later 1930s, streamlined styling had become the dominant design trend in the industry. The new, "Job-Rated" Dodge trucks followed suit, representing the "Streamline Moderne," Art Deco–based style, inspired by aerodynamic design, and characterized by elongated horizontal lines and curving forms meant to give the impression of sleekness and modernity.

The all new, all-steel cabs featured a front-end design with a barrel-shaped base and a sharp V-shaped grille; long, sleek, crowned front and rear fenders, with embossed "speed lines" on the lower rears of each fender; and a new sloped, two-piece windshield, that could be opened for increased airflow. The headlamps were still free-standing, but were mounted in bullet-shaped pods. From the half-tons to the three-ton models, the new trucks all featured the same distinctive design – the heavy-duty models only stood out taller, on larger wheels and tires.

The unique styling of the trucks was only really changed in 1940, when Dodge trucks began using sealed-beam headlamps and were equipped with marker lights mounted on the headlamp housing. For the most part, after 1940, year-to-year appearance changes were very minimal. The grille design was slightly changed again in 1941, and this style continued through 1947, except for the lower chrome strips, which were omitted post war.

The Job-Rated trucks had stronger frames than previous Dodge trucks, using steel with a higher tensile strength, and the frame-rails extended further forward past the engine than before, such that the truck's beefy, channel-type bumpers tied the rails together, reinforcing the frame. After World War II, several changes were made to production truck chassis parts, based on reliability experience gained during military service; for instance, stronger differentials and larger axle shafts were used in post-war trucks, and steering boxes were beefed up as well.

All in all, Dodge advertised as many as 175 basic chassis models, and seven engine variants, as well as different "job-rated" choices of clutches, transmissions, axles, gear ratios, springs, tires and brakes. In 1941, General Motors introduced new trucks for Chevrolet and GMC, that literally became known as their Art Deco trucks, and advertised them as "The Right Trucks for all Trades." Both Dodge's "job-rated" trucks, and GM's "Art-Decos" are recognized as prime truck examples of the 1930s Streamline Moderne architecture and design style.

=== Model name codes ===
Introduced as the T-series for the 1939 model year, the line evolved into the V-series for 1940, and W-series for 1941, but the "W" was retained until the end of sales in 1947.

The bottom of the range TC, and its successors VC and WC, were 1/2-ton rated, on a 116 in (295 cm) wheelbase. As the second letter in the model code progressed in the alphabet, the payload rating typically also went up, however this was not implemented consistently. Although the TD-15, VD-15 and WD-15 were 3/4-ton rated, the TD-20 and -21 and its later VD and WD versions were one-tonners. The -15s and the -20s had a 120 in (305 cm) wheelbase, but the 1-ton could also be had with 133 in (338 cm) (the TD-/VD-/WD-21). Second letter 'E' models only existed in the form of the 1939 TE versions. TF-, VF-, and WF-models were either 1-ton or 1 1/2-ton, (Note: Except for the 3/4-ton rated VF-27 through VF-29 of 1940) ranging in wheelbase from 126–190 in (320–483 cm). Second letter G- and H-models were consistently 1 1/2-ton and 2-ton rated, respectively, ranging in wheelbase from 136–220 in (345–559 cm). The 2 1/2-ton rated J-models weren't introduced until the 1946 WJ-55 through WJ-59, ranging from 136–235 in (345–597 cm) in wheelbase. The K-lettered models were consistently 3-ton rated, but the L-lettered models went against the naming pattern – they were only 2-ton rated. Both were offered in wheelbases ranging 152–205 in (386–521 cm) through 1942. From 1946 instead there were 3-ton WK- and WR-models ranging in wheelbase from 136–196 in (345–498 cm).

== Engine ==
Dodge's Job-Rated trucks used flathead sixes, originally developed by Plymouth, throughout the 1939–1947 range. In the light half-ton trucks, a 201.3-cubic-inch (3,299 cc) engine was initially standard, with 70 hp (52 kW) in 1939, but uprated to 79 hp (59 kW) in 1940, and 82.5 hp (61.5 kW) by 1941. The three-quarter-ton and one-ton trucks used a 217.8-cubic-inch (3,569 cc) engine from 1939 to 1941, rated at 77 hp (57 kW) initially, then at 82 hp (61 kW) in 1940, and at 85 hp (63 kW) in 1941.

Starting in 1942 (just before civilian production ended), the 201-cubic-inch engines were dropped from the range, and the 1/2-ton light-duty models received the larger 218-cubic-inch six, like the 3/4-ton pickups, going up to 95 hp (71 kW) gross after the war, while the one-ton trucks received a larger 230.2-cubic-inch (3,772 cc) unit (instead of the 218), with 102 hp (76 kW), until the lineup was replaced in 1947. A three-speed manual was standard issue, while a four-speed with a compound first gear was an option.

The 1939–1947 TK- and TL- through WK- and WL-models were also available with a diesel engine – Dodge's own diesel engine – Dodge and Mack Trucks were the only two American automakers of the period before World War II, to have their own diesel engines. An additional 6-volt auxiliary generator debuted in 1941 on the diesel engines. The unit furnished power for lighting, instruments, and horns. Diesel sales were extremely limited however, counting as many as 75 units sold in 1939, 134 units in 1940, and 195 units in 1941.

== Bodies and options ==
Besides with the "Express" pick-up bodywork, the Job-Rated trucks were available in cab/chassis, cowl/chassis, or bare chassis (for third-party custom body) versions.

At the bottom of the range, Dodge offered the three now common pick-up classes (1/2-ton, 3/4-ton and one-ton), as well as a 1 1/2-ton pickup. Dodge's half-ton pickups, on a 116 in (2.95 m) wheelbase with a 7 1/2-foot box, now had the 70-horsepower 201-cubic-inch L-head straight-six. The 3/4- and 1-ton models kept the 75-horsepower 218-cubic-inch L-head six, either on a 120 in (3.05 m) wheelbase with a 7 1/2-foot box, or a 133 in (3.38 m) wheelbase with a 9-foot bed. Dodge's 1 1/2-ton pick-up, offered from the Job-Rated trucks launch in 1939 until the 1942 switch to all-wartime production, consisted of the long-wheelbase one-ton model with 9-foot bed, but on bigger wheels and tires.

Aside from as pickups, the lightest models in the range, the 116 in (2.95 m) wheelbase TC/VC/WC half-tons, were also offered as a delivery truck, either with solid steel "panel" van body, or open canvas-covered canopy or screenside configuration.

After the war, both the 1 1/2-ton pickup, and the long one-ton pickup with the nine-foot bed were dropped. Post-war available equipment options included a larger clutch, four-speed transmission, oversize tires, electric driver's wiper, heater, chrome windshield frame, adjustable visor, driver's armrest, dome light, turn signals, "airfoam" seat with leather upholstery, and an AM radio.

== Models used by the military ==
=== Purpose-built four-wheel drive ===
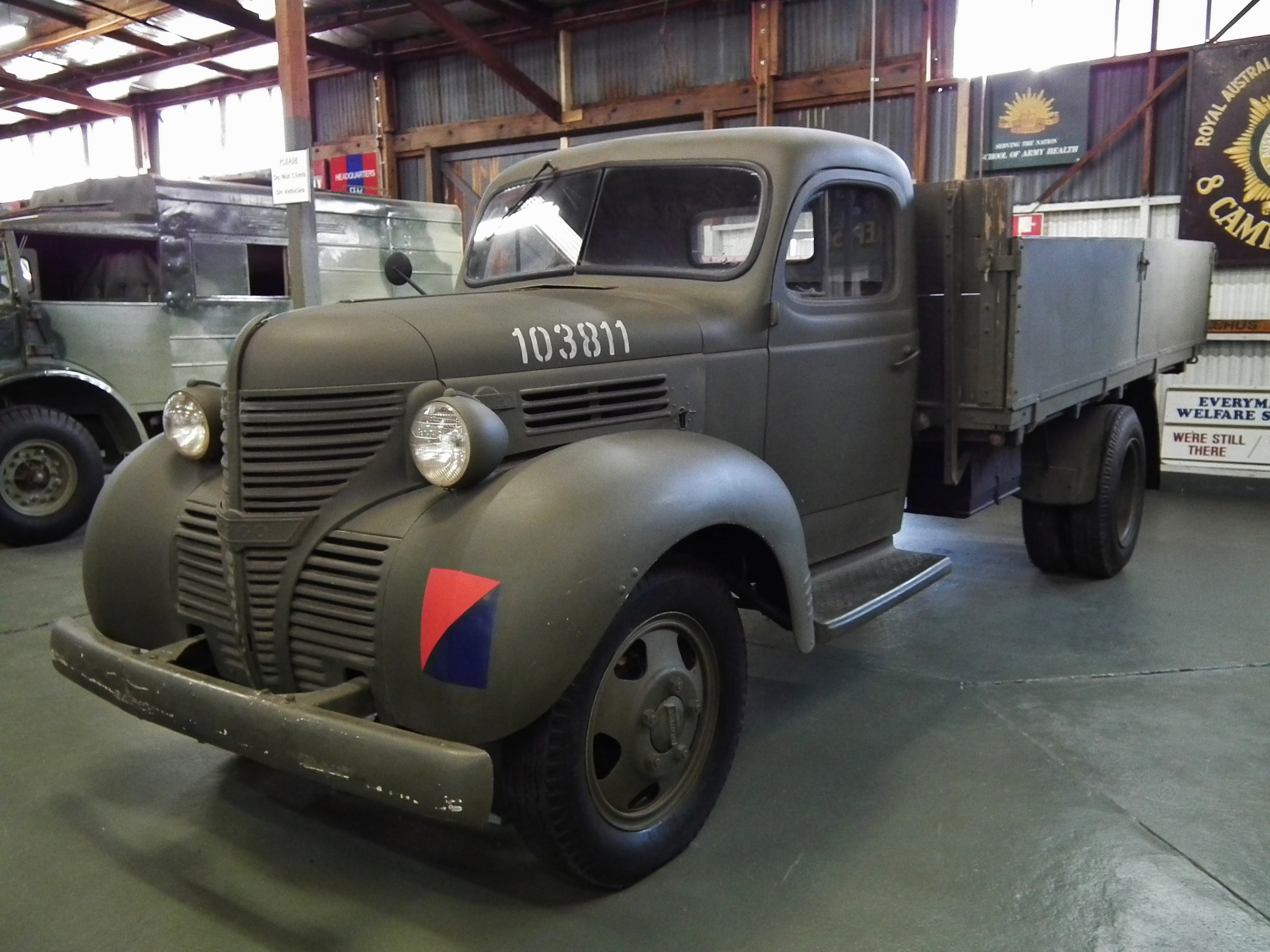
1940 Fargo-badged truck at the Australian Army History Unit museum.

After Dodge supplied the U.S. Army with its first four-wheel drive truck in 1934, more modern 1 1/2-ton 4x4 trucks were developed. Some 1,700 RF-40-X-4(USA) trucks, based on Dodge's new from 1936 "fore-point" trucks were supplied In 1938, and a further 292 TF-40-X-4(USA) in 1939, based on the brand new for 1939 T-series, the first year trucks of this article. In late 1939 and in 1940, Dodge again gained Army contracts to design and build 1/2-ton and 1 1/2-ton 4×4 military trucks in several styles, using as many commercial truck parts as possible. Based on the VC-Series, and internally called the T-202 series, the VC-1 through VC-6 came with essentially stock front-end sheetmetal. Similarly, their 116-inch wheelbase and 201-cubic-inch 79-horsepower six-cylinder engine shared much with Dodge's civilian 1/2-ton VC. The following year, the T202 was replaced by the T-207 series trucks. Again rated as 1/2-tonners, they featured a military-specific hood, grille, and fenders. These trucks were powered by the 218-cubic-inch six of 85 horsepower taken from Dodge's 3/4- and one-ton commercial models. Eventually, the military trucks were substantially redesigned, and uprated to 3/4-tons with a 230-cubic-inch engine producing 92 hp. Together with the 1/2-tons of 1941, these were built from 1942 until the end of the war as the Dodge WC series military trucks. Some 30 were modified as armored trucks by the French in Syria prior to WWII and known as the Automitrailleuse Dodge Tanake. The Tanake was fitted with a 37mm cannon M1916 and two or three FM 24/29 light machine guns and a crew of 5. The vehicles served with French Foreign Legion, both Vichy and Free French units during WWII and post-war used by the Syrian government in the 1948 Arab–Israeli War.

=== Stock models and specifications ===
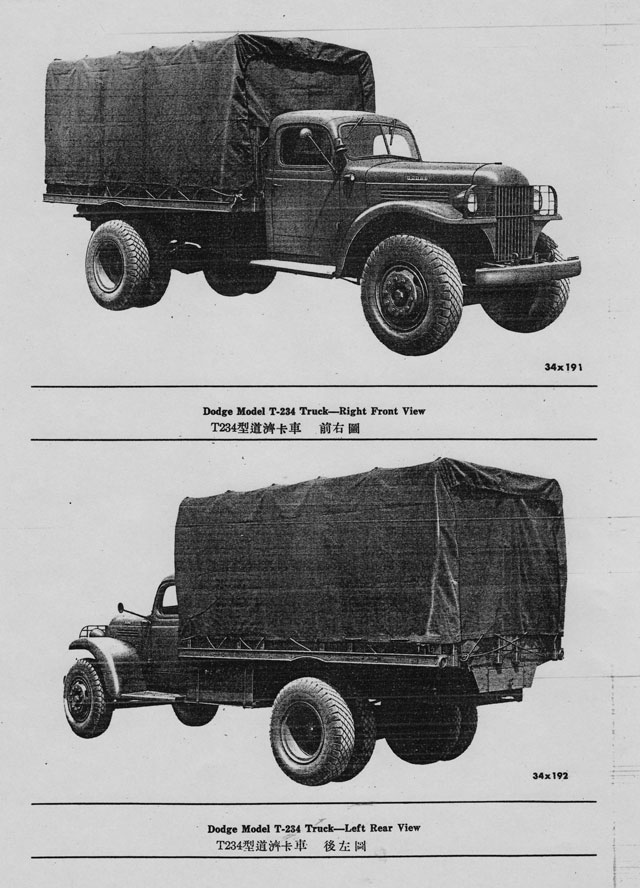
Dodge T-234 Lend-Lease truck for nationalist China

The U.S. military also used some of Dodge's light truck models in mostly stock, two-wheel-drive form. Technical manuals of U.S. Army military vehicles offer some more detailed specifications on three such models: the 1947 model year WC and WD-15 models, and the 160 inch wheelbase version of the SNL G-number 618 aka the WF-32.

Additionally, there were 4×2, civilian-based variants built either as Canadian "Modified Conventional Pattern" or "Canadian Military Pattern trucks," called the D15 (15cwt, or 3/4-ton – engineering code T-222), and the D60S and D60L (60cwt, or 3-ton, engineering code T-110, with a short 136 in (3,500 mm) or long 160 in (4.1 m) wheelbase). The Canadian models were built with a 236.6 cu in (3,877 cm^{3}) engine with a 25" block, that was unique to them, and they had beefed up rear axles. Chrysler Corporation of Canada produced a total of 180,816 military Dodge trucks during 1939–1945.

==== Dodge T-234 "China / Burma" truck ====
A special case in between stock commercial and dedicated military trucks was the T-234 "China / Burma Road" truck, which was built as part of the Allied cooperation with China against Japan, in the war and just thereafter. From October 1944 through March 1946, Dodge built 15,000 trucks, that used a special-order combination of its heaviest-duty off-the-shelf components, to overland supplies from India to China over the very rough Ledo Road (later renamed after Joseph Stilwell), to an extent to specifications personally drawn up by Generalissimo Chiang Kai-shek, then president and commander of the Nationalist Chinese forces. Chiang Kai-shek asked Roosevelt himself for 15,000 two-and-a-half-ton trucks capable of handling the Burma Road, requiring them to have an engine of at least 300 cubic inches and a 5-speed transmission.

The trucks were built with a near-standard civilian closed cab – right-hand drive because Burma was under British rule – but fitted with a flat, military-style grille & brush guard, and wide open, almost flat fenders, to avoid mud build-up clogging the wheels rotating, and otherwise stood out by having a 60-gallon fuel tank. In order for the trucks to function on the gruelling 4,700 miles (7,600 km) journey over the Himalayas, Dodge fitted not only heavy-duty springs and steering gear, but went so far as to fit tri-metal aircraft grade bearings and aeroplane-type shock absorbers. Radiators were fitted with an overflow tank, to return the cooled water to the sealed cooling system. Ground clearance was 13 in (33 cm), with a 50° approach angle, and 28.5° departure. Front axles were widened to give wider tread. Nevertheless, the average life of the trucks was only about five trips.

It has been commented that the front sheet metal design of the T-234 Burma Dodge shows remarkable resemblance to that of the post-war Dodge Power Wagons, and may well have influenced it.

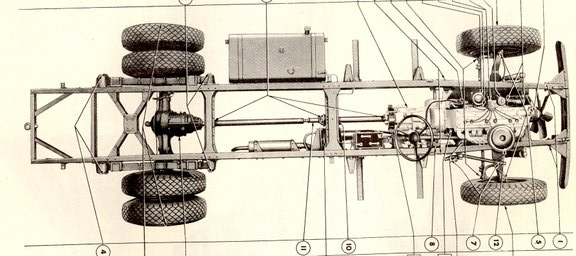
Burma Dodge frame – 170 in (4.32 m) wheelbase

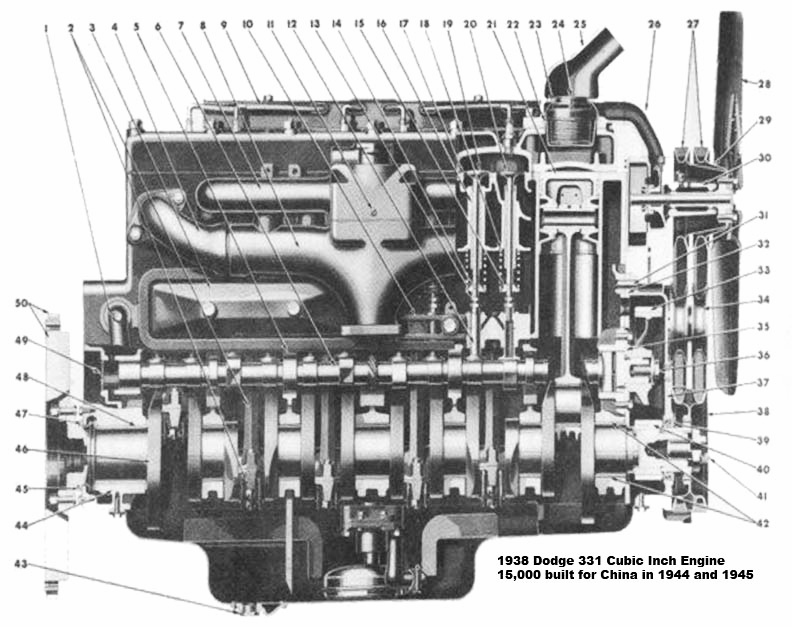
T-234, 331 CI engine, originally a diesel

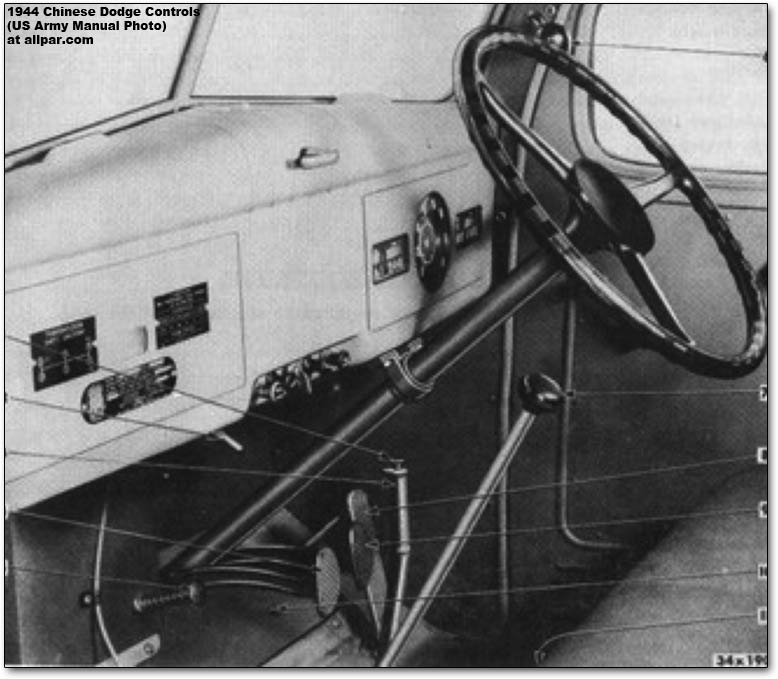
T-234 interior dashboard

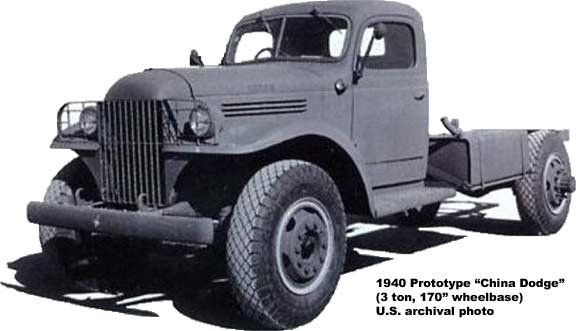
T-234 – prototype

== Specifications table ==
This table offers specifications for a few high-profile models in the extensive 1939–1947 range only.

Model	Dodge WC	Dodge WD-15	Dodge WF-32	Dodge D60S	Dodge T-234 "Burma"
Body style	Express body pickup	Express body pickup	Closed cab, stake and platform	Closed cab, dump truck	Closed cab, stake and platform
Model year	1947	1947	1941–1947	1939–1942	1944–1946
Rating	1/2-ton	3/4-ton	1 1/2-ton	3-ton	3-ton
Engine	217.8 cu in (3,569 cm^{3})	217.8 cu in (3,569 cm^{3})	236.6 cu in (3,877 cm^{3})	236.6 cu in (3,877 cm^{3})	331.4 cu in (5,431 cm^{3})
Power	85 hp (63 kW) @ 3000 rpm	85 hp (63 kW) @ 3000 rpm	104 hp (78 kW) @ 3000 rpm	95 hp (71 kW) @ 3600 rpm	118 hp (88 kW) @ 2800 rpm
Torque	170 lb⋅ft (230 N⋅m) @ 1200 rpm	170 lb⋅ft (230 N⋅m) @ 1200 rpm	190 lb⋅ft (258 N⋅m) @ 1500–2200 rpm		262 lb⋅ft (355 N⋅m) @ 1200 rpm
Max speed	64 mph (103 km/h) (Note: governed)	62 mph (100 km/h) (Note: recommended)	45 mph (72 km/h)		39.7 mph (64 km/h)
Max grade loaded (Note: computed ability in lowest gear)	37 percent	30 percent	49.9 percent		40 percent
Wheelbase	116 in (2.95 m)	120 in (3.05 m)	160 in (4.06 m)	136 in (3.45 m)	170 in (4.32 m)
Front track	55.8 in (1.42 m)	55.9 in (1.42 m)	57.8 in (1.47 m)		70 3/4 in (1.80 m)
Rear track	61.1 in (1.55 m)	60.2 in (1.53 m)	63.8 in (1.62 m)		72 in (1.83 m)
Length	183.3 in (4.66 m)	183.3 in (4.66 m)	253.5 in (6.44 m)	204.5 in (5.19 m)	265 9/32 in (6.74 m)
Width	74.1 in (1.88 m)	74.1 in (1.88 m)	88 in (2.24 m)	84 in (2.13 m)	88 in (2.24 m)
Height	74.1 in (1.88 m)	75.8 in (1.93 m)	82.7 in (2.10 m)	83 in (2.11 m)	115.5 in (2.93 m)
Net weight	3,365 lb (1,530 kg)	3,200 lb (1,450 kg)	5,580 lb (2,530 kg)	7,640 lb (3,470 kg)	9,910 lb (4,500 kg)
Gross weight	4,365 lb (1,980 kg)	4,700 lb (2,130 kg)	8,750 lb (3,970 kg)		20,000 lb (9,070 kg)
Payload	1,000 lb (450 kg)	1,500 lb (680 kg)	3,170 lb (1,440 kg)		
Tires	6.50" × 16"	7.00" × 15"	7.50" × 20"	8.25" × 20", (Note: with dual rear wheels) later 10.50" × 16" (Note: with single rear wheels)	10.00" × 20"
Transmission	Three-speed manual	Three-speed manual	Four-speed manual	Four-speed manual	Five-speed manual
Gearing	High 1:1 / Low 3.3:1	High 1:1 / Low 3.3:1	High 1:1 / Low 6.4:1	high and low range	High / Low 8.4:1
Fuel	72 octane gasoline	70 octane gasoline	70 octane gasoline		
Fuel capacity	18 US gal (68 L)	18 US gal (68 L)	18 US gal (68 L)		60 US gal (227 L)
Range loaded	216 mi (348 km)	162 mi (261 km)	125 mi (201 km)		285 mi (459 km)

== Model table ==
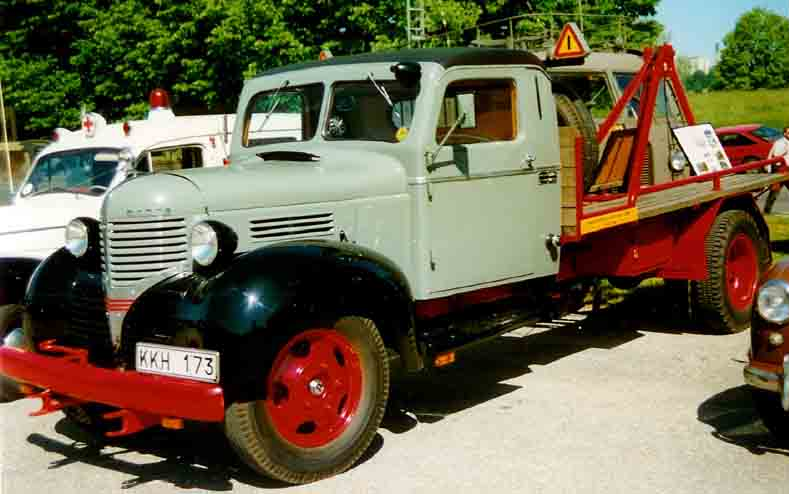
1939 Dodge TXE32 Wrecker

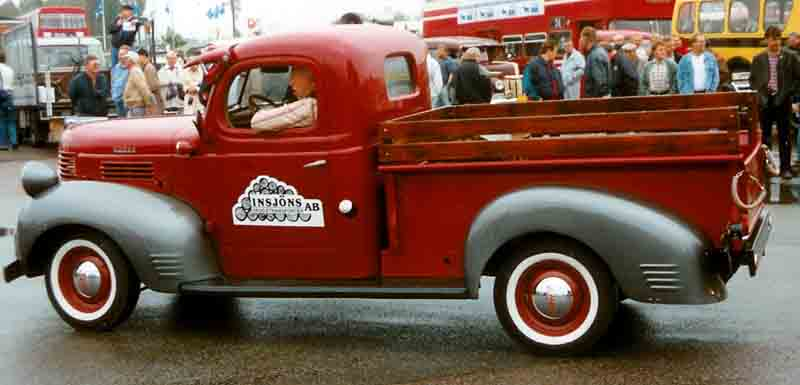
1946 Dodge pickup

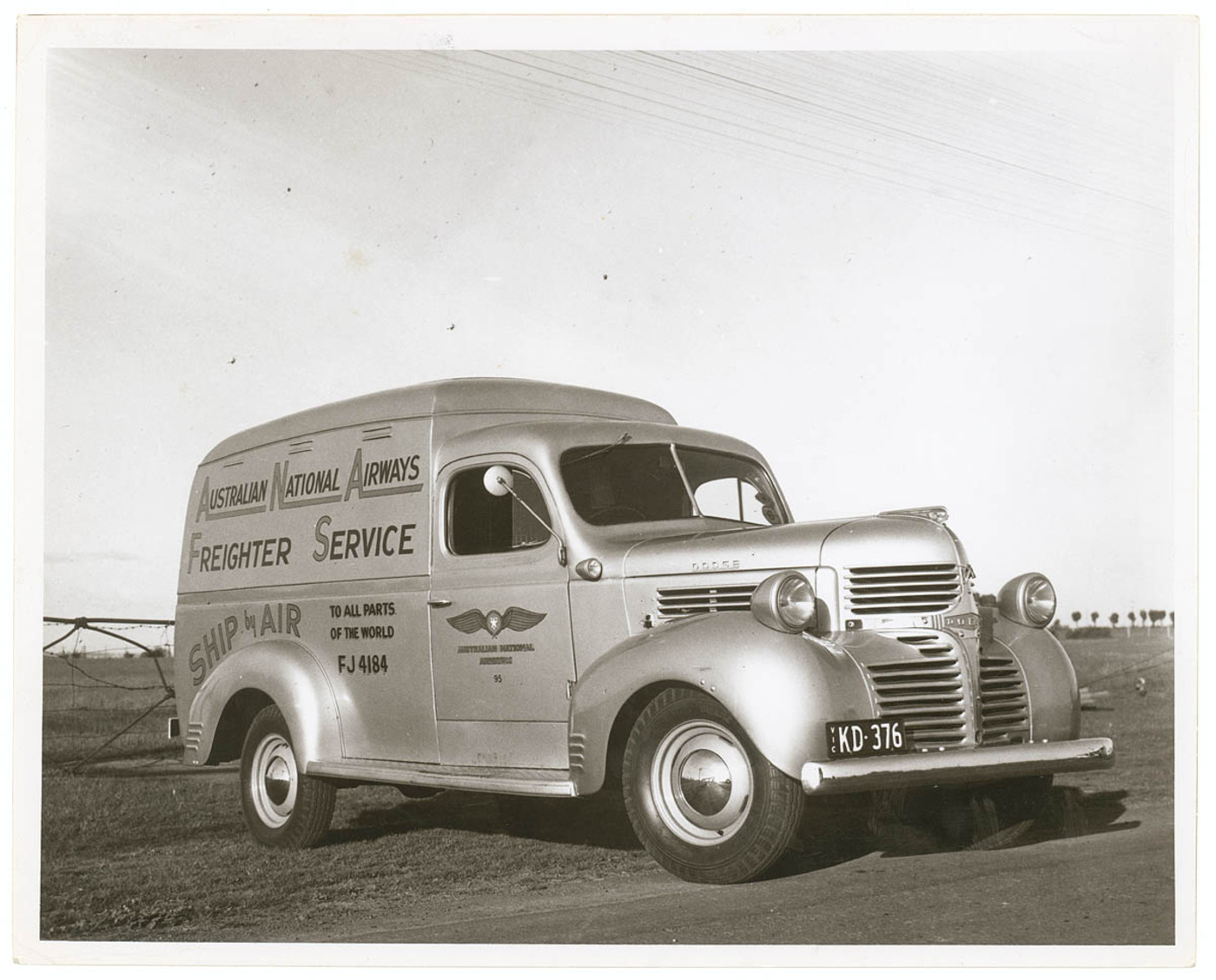
Australian National Airways Freighter Service van, 1946 model

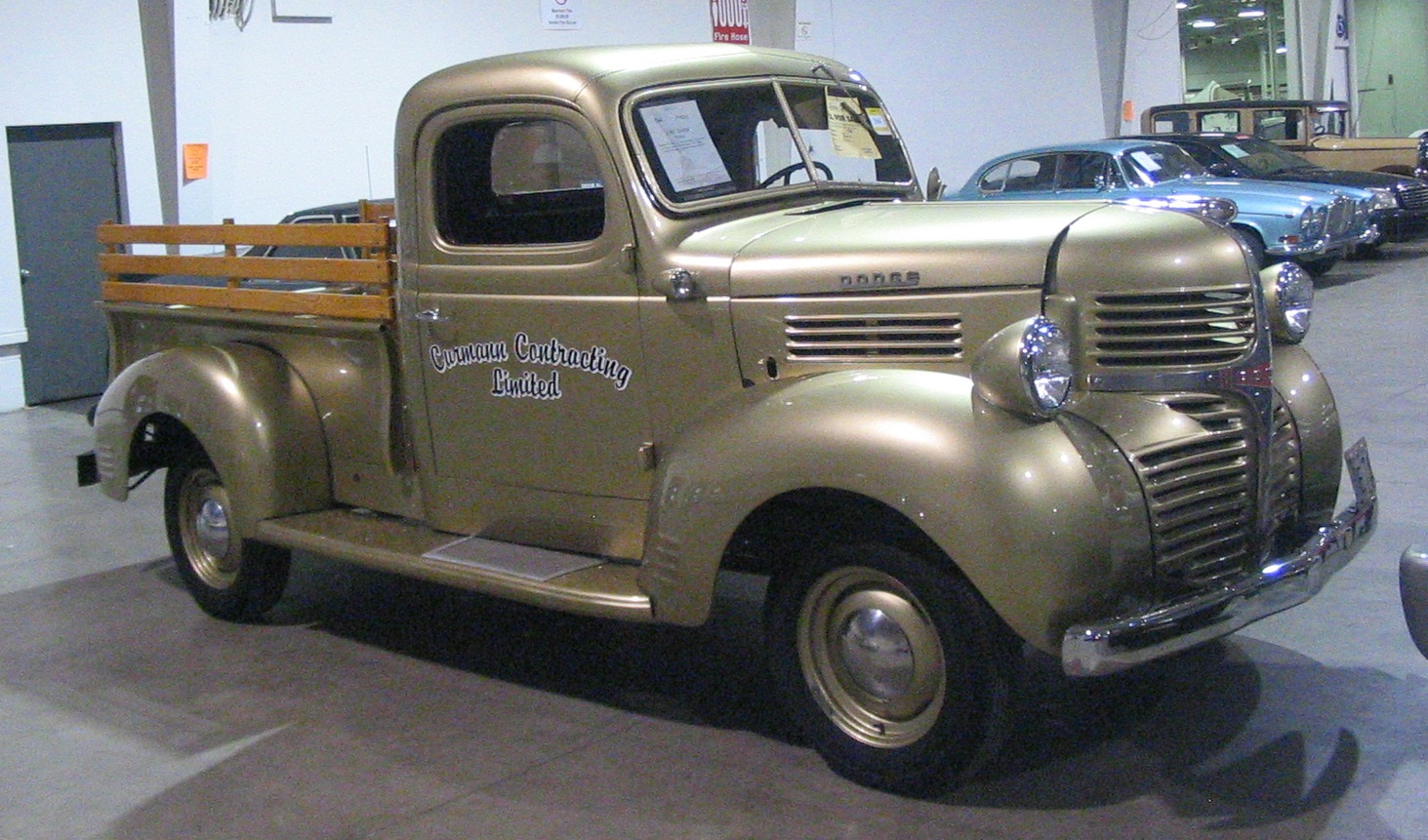
1947 Dodge pickup

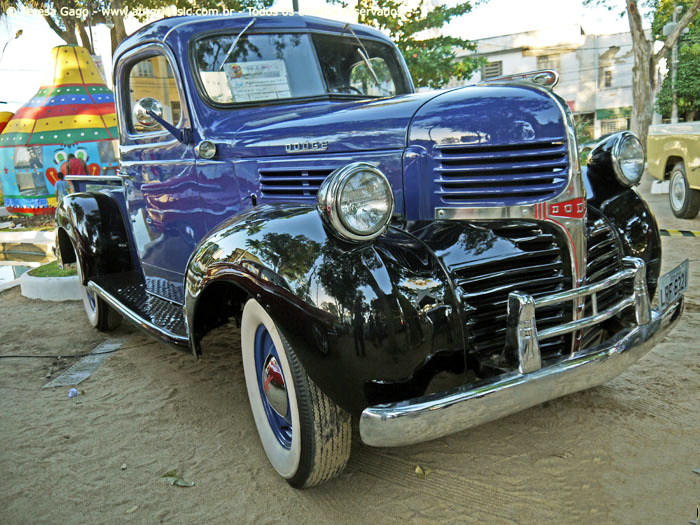
1947 Dodge 1-ton pickup

Dodge offered their 1939–1947 "Job-Rated" trucks in many variants. complemented with information about Dodge engine & engineering codes from the same website,.

Models with an "M" as the third letter in the model code are cabover body style. Cabover body was available for 1 1/2 ton or 2 ton WF, WG or WH models: WFM, WGM or WHM. Models with an "A" have a 2 speed rear axle which was available for 1 1/2 to 3 ton trucks. "A" is 3rd letter for conventional cabs, such as WFA-32 or 4th letter for cabovers or diesels, such as WHMA- 47 or WKDA-62. There were no diesel cabovers. Some 2 speed rear axles shift with a shift lever connected to a long rod that connects to the rear axle, some shift with a combination of vacuum from the intake manifold in a long tube from the engine to the rear axle for high range and a spring on the rear axle that pushes it into low gear when the vacuum is off. Engine vacuum is turned on and off with a valve in the engine compartment that is connected by a long wire in a cover/loom to a knob mounted on the transmission shift lever in the cab. "X" in the model code is for extra equipment like brake booster, PTO, engine governor 4 wheel drive, etc. Models with a "D" as the third letter in the model code, and marked with "D" behind the engine code, indicate models that were offered with a diesel engine.

Model(s)	Model year	Engine	Displacement	Power	Rating	Wheelbase
TC	1939	T-68	201.3 cu in (3,300 cm^{3})	70 HP	1/2-ton	116 in (2.95 m)
TD-15	1939	T-70	217.8 cu in (3,570 cm^{3})	77 HP	3/4-ton	120 in (3.05 m)
TD-20	1939	T-72	217.8 cu in (3,570 cm^{3})	77 HP	1-ton	120 in (3.05 m)
TD-21	1939	T-72	217.8 cu in (3,570 cm^{3})	77 HP	1-ton	133 in (3.38 m)
TE-20	1939	T-74	217.8 cu in (3,570 cm^{3})	77 HP	1-ton	126 in (3.20 m)
TE-21	1939	T-74	217.8 cu in (3,570 cm^{3})	77 HP	1-ton	133 in (3.38 m)
TE-22	1939	T-74	217.8 cu in (3,570 cm^{3})	77 HP	1-ton	160 in (4.06 m)
TE-30	1939	T-74	218.1 cu in (3,570 cm^{3}) or 217.8 cu in (3,570 cm^{3})	73 HP or 77 HP	1 1/2-ton	126 in (3.20 m)
TE-31	1939	T-74	218.1 cu in (3,570 cm^{3}) or 217.8 cu in (3,570 cm^{3})	73 HP or 77 HP	1 1/2-ton	133 in (3.38 m)
TE-32	1939	T-74	218.1 cu in (3,570 cm^{3}) or 217.8 cu in (3,570 cm^{3})	73 HP or 77 HP	1 1/2-ton	160 in (4.06 m)
TF-29, TFA-29	1939	T-76	217.8 cu in (3,570 cm^{3})	77 HP	1-ton	133 in (3.38 m)
TF-30, TFA-30	1939	T-76	217.8 cu in (3,570 cm^{3})	77 HP	1-ton	148 in (3.76 m)
TF-35, TFA-35	1939	T-76	228.1 cu in (3,740 cm^{3}) or 217.8 cu in (3,570 cm^{3})	78 HP or 77 HP	1 1/2-ton	126 in (3.20 m)
TF-36, TFA-36	1939	T-76	228.1 cu in (3,740 cm^{3}) or 217.8 cu in (3,570 cm^{3})	78 HP or 77 HP	1 1/2-ton	133 in (3.38 m)
TF-37(-X), TFA-37	1939	T-76	228.1 cu in (3,740 cm^{3}) or 217.8 cu in (3,570 cm^{3})	78 HP or 77 HP	1 1/2-ton	160 in (4.06 m)
TF-38(-X), TFA-38	1939	T-76	228.1 cu in (3,740 cm^{3}) or 217.8 cu in (3,570 cm^{3})	78 HP or 77 HP	1 1/2-ton	190 in (4.83 m)
TF-39	1939	T-76	217.8 cu in (3,570 cm^{3})	77 HP	1 1/2-ton	182 in (4.62 m)
TG-40, TGA-40	1939	T-78			1 1/2-ton	136 in (3.45 m)
TG-41, TGA-41	1939	T-78			1 1/2-ton	148 in (3.76 m)
TG-42, TGA-42	1939	T-78			1 1/2-ton	160 in (4.06 m)
TG-43, TGA-43	1939	T-78			1 1/2-ton	178 in (4.52 m)
TG-44, TGA-44	1939	T-78			1 1/2-ton	220 in (5.59 m)
TH-45, THA-45	1939	T-78			2-ton	136 in (3.45 m)
TH-46, THA-46	1939	T-78			2-ton	148 in (3.76 m)
TH-47, THA-47	1939	T-78			2-ton	160 in (4.06 m)
TH-48, THA-48	1939	T-78			2-ton	178 in (4.52 m)
TH-49, THA-49	1939	T-78			2-ton	220 in (5.59 m)
TK-60, TKA-60	1939	T-80			3-ton	152 in (3.86 m)
TK-61, TKA-61	1939	T-80			3-ton	170 in (4.32 m)
TK-62, TKA-62	1939	T-80			3-ton	188 in (4.78 m)
TK-63, TKA-63	1939	T-80			3-ton	205 in (5.21 m)
TKD-60, TKDA-60	1939	T-84 D	331 cu in (5,420 cm^{3})	96 HP	3-ton	152 in (3.86 m)
TKD-61, TKDA-61	1939	T-84 D	331 cu in (5,420 cm^{3})	96 HP	3-ton	170 in (4.32 m)
TKD-62, TKDA-62	1939	T-84 D	331 cu in (5,420 cm^{3})	96 HP	3-ton	188 in (4.78 m)
TKD-63, TKDA-63	1939	T-84 D	331 cu in (5,420 cm^{3})	96 HP	3-ton	205 in (5.21 m)
TL-50, TLA-50	1939	T-80			2-ton	152 in (3.86 m)
TL-51, TLA-51	1939	T-80			2-ton	170 in (4.32 m)
TL-52, TLA-52	1939	T-80			2-ton	188 in (4.78 m)
TLD-50, TLDA-50	1939	T-84 D	331 cu in (5,420 cm^{3})	96 HP	2-ton	152 in (3.86 m)
TLD-53, TLDA-53	1939	T-84 D	331 cu in (5,420 cm^{3})	96 HP	2-ton	205 in (5.21 m)
VC	1940	T-92	201.3 cu in (3,300 cm^{3})	79 HP	1/2-ton	116 in (2.95 m)
VD-15	1940	T-94	217.8 cu in (3,570 cm^{3})	82 HP	3/4-ton	120 in (3.05 m)
VD-20	1940	T-96	217.8 cu in (3,570 cm^{3})	82 HP	1-ton	120 in (3.05 m)
VD-21	1940	T-96	217.8 cu in (3,570 cm^{3})	82 HP	1-ton	133 in (3.38 m)
VF-20, VFA-20	1940	T-98	228.1 cu in (3,740 cm^{3})		1-ton	126 in (3.20 m)
VF-21, VFA-21	1940	T-98	228.1 cu in (3,740 cm^{3})		1-ton	133 in (3.38 m)
VF-22, VFA-22	1940	T-98	228.1 cu in (3,740 cm^{3})		1-ton	160 in (4.06 m)
VF-27	1940	T-98	228.1 cu in (3,740 cm^{3})		3/4-ton	126 in (3.20 m)
VF-28	1940	T-98	228.1 cu in (3,740 cm^{3})		3/4-ton	133 in (3.38 m)
VF-29, VFA-29	1940	T-98	228.1 cu in (3,740 cm^{3})		3/4-ton	160 in (4.06 m)
VF-30, VFA-30	1940	T-98	228.1 cu in (3,740 cm^{3})		1 1/2-ton	126 in (3.20 m)
VF-31, VFA-31	1940	T-98	228.1 cu in (3,740 cm^{3})		1 1/2-ton	133 in (3.38 m)
VF-32, VFA-32	1940	T-98	228.1 cu in (3,740 cm^{3})		1 1/2-ton	160 in (4.06 m)
VF-33, VFA-33	1940	T-98	228.1 cu in (3,740 cm^{3})		1 1/2-ton	190 in (4.83 m)
VF-39	1940	T-102			1 1/2-ton	182 in (4.62 m)
VG-40, VGA-40	1940	T-100			1 1/2-ton	136 in (3.45 m)
VG-41, VGA-41	1940	T-100			1 1/2-ton	148 in (3.76 m)
VG-42, VGA-42	1940	T-100			1 1/2-ton	160 in (4.06 m)
VG-43, VGA-43	1940	T-100			1 1/2-ton	178 in (4.52 m)
VG-44, VGA-44	1940	T-100			1 1/2-ton	220 in (5.59 m)
VH-45, VHA-45	1940	T-100			2-ton	136 in (3.45 m)
VH-46, VHA-46	1940	T-100			2-ton	148 in (3.76 m)
VH-47, VHA-47	1940	T-100			2-ton	160 in (4.06 m)
VH-48, VHA-48	1940	T-100			2-ton	178 in (4.52 m)
VH-49, VHA-49	1940	T-100			2-ton	220 in (5.59 m)
VK-60, VKA-60	1940	T-104			3-ton	152 in (3.86 m)
VK-61, VKA-61	1940	T-104			3-ton	170 in (4.32 m)
VK-62, VKA-62	1940	T-104			3-ton	188 in (4.78 m)
VK-63, VKA-63	1940	T-104			3-ton	205 in (5.21 m)
VKD-60, VKDA-60	1940	T-106 D			3-ton	152 in (3.86 m)
VKD-61, VKDA-61	1940	T-106 D			3-ton	170 in (4.32 m)
VKD-62, VKDA-62	1940	T-106 D			3-ton	188 in (4.78 m)
VKD-63, VKDA-63	1940	T-106 D			3-ton	205 in (5.21 m)
VL-50, VLA-50	1940	T-104			2-ton	152 in (3.86 m)
VLD-50, VLDA-50	1940	T-106 D			2-ton	152 in (3.86 m)
VLD-51, VLDA-51	1940	T-106 D			2-ton	170 in (4.32 m)
VLD-53, VLDA-53	1940	T-106 D			2-ton	205 in (5.21 m)
VR-40, VRA-40	1940	T-90			1 1/2-ton	105 in (2.67 m)
VR-42, VRA-42	1940	T-90			1 1/2-ton	129 in (3.28 m)
VR-43, VRA-43	1940	T-90			1 1/2-ton	159 in (4.04 m)
VS-45, VSA-45	1940	T-90			2-ton	105 in (2.67 m)
VS-47, VSA-47	1940	T-90			2-ton	129 in (3.28 m)
VS-48, VSA-48	1940	T-90			2-ton	159 in (4.04 m)
WC	1941	T-112	201.3 cu in (3,300 cm^{3})	82.5	1/2-ton	116 in (2.95 m)
WC	1942	T-112	217.8 cu in (3,570 cm^{3})	85 HP	1/2-ton	116 in (2.95 m)
WC	1946-1947		217.8 cu in (3,570 cm^{3})	95 HP	1/2-ton	116 in (2.95 m)
WD-15	1941-1947	T-114	217.8 cu in (3,570 cm^{3})	85 HP	3/4-ton	120 in (3.05 m)
WD-20	1941	T-114	217.8 cu in (3,570 cm^{3})	85 HP	1-ton	120 in (3.05 m)
WD-20	1942-1947	T-116	230.2 cu in (3,770 cm^{3})	102 HP	1-ton	120 in (3.05 m)
WD-21	1941	T-116	217.8 cu in (3,570 cm^{3})	85 HP	1-ton	133 in (3.38 m)
WD-21	1942-1947	T-116	230.2 cu in (3,770 cm^{3})	102 HP	1-ton	133 in (3.38 m)
WF-20, WFA-20	1941-1947	T-118	236 cu in (3,870 cm^{3})	104 HP	1-ton	126 in (3.20 m)
WF-21, WFA-21	1941-1947	T-118	236 cu in (3,870 cm^{3})	104 HP	1-ton	135 in (3.43 m)
WF-22, WFA-22	1941-1947	T-118	236 cu in (3,870 cm^{3})	104 HP	1-ton	160 in (4.06 m)
WF-23	1945-1947	T-118	236 cu in (3,870 cm^{3})	104 HP	1-ton	190 in (4.83 m)
WF-30, WFA-30	1941-1947	T-118	236 cu in (3,870 cm^{3})	104 HP	1 1/2-ton	126 in (3.20 m)
WF(X)-31, WFA(X)-31	1941-1947	T-118	236 cu in (3,870 cm^{3})	104 HP	1 1/2-ton	135 in (3.43 m)
WF(X)-32, WFA(X)-32	1941-1947	T-118	236 cu in (3,870 cm^{3})	104 HP	1 1/2-ton	160 in (4.06 m)
WF-33, WFA-33	1941-1947	T-118	236 cu in (3,870 cm^{3})	104 HP	1 1/2-ton	190 in (4.83 m)
WF(X)-34, WFA(X)-34	1941-1947	T-118	236 cu in (3,870 cm^{3})	104 HP	1 1/2-ton	178 in (4.52 m)
WF(X)-36, WFA(X)-36	1941-1947	T-118	236 cu in (3,870 cm^{3})	104 HP	1 1/2-ton	200 in (5.08 m)
WF-39	1941-1947	T-122	228 or 236 cu in (3.7 or 3.9 L)		1 1/2-ton	182 in (4.62 m)
WG-40, WGA(X)-40	1941-1947	T-120	241 or 251 cu in (3.9 or 4.1 L)		1 1/2-ton	136 in (3.45 m)
WG-41, WGA(X)-41	1941-1947	T-120	241 or 251 cu in (3.9 or 4.1 L)		1 1/2-ton	148 in (3.76 m)
WG-42, WGA(X)-42	1941-1947	T-120	241 or 251 cu in (3.9 or 4.1 L)		1 1/2-ton	160 in (4.06 m)
WG-43, WGA(X)-43	1941-1947	T-120	241 or 251 cu in (3.9 or 4.1 L)		1 1/2-ton	178 in (4.52 m)
WG-44, WGA(X)-44	1941-1947	T-120	241 or 251 cu in (3.9 or 4.1 L)		1 1/2-ton	190 in (4.83 m)
WH(X)-45, WHA(X)-45	1941-1947	T-120	241 or 251 cu in (3.9 or 4.1 L)		2-ton	136 in (3.45 m)
WH(X)-46, WHA(X)-46	1941-1947	T-120	241 or 251 cu in (3.9 or 4.1 L)		2-ton	148 in (3.76 m)
WH(X)-47, WHA(X)-47	1941-1947	T-120	241 or 251 cu in (3.9 or 4.1 L)		2-ton	160 in (4.06 m)
WH(X)-48, WHA(X)-48	1941-1947	T-120	241 or 251 cu in (3.9 or 4.1 L)		2-ton	178 in (4.52 m)
WH(X)-49, WHA(X)-49	1941-1947	T-120	241 or 251 cu in (3.9 or 4.1 L)		2-ton	220 in (5.59 m)
WJ-55	1946-1947	T-136	281.6 cu in (4,610 cm^{3})		2 1/2-ton	136 in (3.45 m)
WJ-56	1946-1947	T-136	281.6 cu in (4,610 cm^{3})		2 1/2-ton	142 in (3.61 m)
WJ-57	1946-1947	T-136	281.6 cu in (4,610 cm^{3})		2 1/2-ton	160 in (4.06 m)
WJ-58	1946-1947	T-136	281.6 cu in (4,610 cm^{3})		2 1/2-ton	178 in (4.52 m)
WJ-59	1946-1947	T-136	281.6 cu in (4,610 cm^{3})		2 1/2-ton	235 in (5.97 m)
WK-60, WKA-60	1941-1942	T-124	331 cu in (5,420 cm^{3})		3-ton	152 in (3.86 m)
WK-61, WKA-61	1941-1942	T-124	331 cu in (5,420 cm^{3})		3-ton	170 in (4.32 m)
WK-62, WKA-62	1941-1942	T-124	331 cu in (5,420 cm^{3})		3-ton	188 in (4.78 m)
WK-63, WKA-63	1941-1942	T-124	331 cu in (5,420 cm^{3})		3-ton	205 in (5.21 m)
WKD-60, WKDA-60	1941-1942	T-126 D			3-ton	152 in (3.86 m)
WKD-61, WKDA-61	1941-1942	T-126 D			3-ton	170 in (4.32 m)
WKD-62, WKDA-62	1941-1942	T-126 D			3-ton	188 in (4.78 m)
WKD-63, WKDA-63	1941-1942	T-126 D			3-ton	205 in (5.21 m)
WL-50, WLA-50	1941-1942	T-124	331 cu in (5,420 cm^{3})		2-ton	152 in (3.86 m)
WL-51, WLA-51	1941-1942	T-124	331 cu in (5,420 cm^{3})		2-ton	170 in (4.32 m)
WL-52, WLA-52	1941-1942	T-124	331 cu in (5,420 cm^{3})		2-ton	188 in (4.78 m)
WL-53, WLA-53	1941-1942	T-124	331 cu in (5,420 cm^{3})		2-ton	205 in (5.21 m)
WLD-50, WLDA-50	1941-1942	T-126 D			2-ton	152 in (3.86 m)
WK-65, WR-65	1946-1947	T-135	331 cu in (5,420 cm^{3})		3-ton	136 in (3.45 m)
WK-66, WR-66	1946-1947	T-135	331 cu in (5,420 cm^{3})		3-ton	142 in (3.61 m)
WK-67, WR-67	1946-1947	T-135	331 cu in (5,420 cm^{3})		3-ton	160 in (4.06 m)
WK-68, WR-68	1946-1947	T-135	331 cu in (5,420 cm^{3})		3-ton	178 in (4.52 m)
WK-69, WR-69	1946-1947	T-135	331 cu in (5,420 cm^{3})		3-ton	196 in (4.98 m)

== See also ==
- Chevrolet AK / BK / etc. series – a contemporaneous American truck series, popularly called the Chevy "Art Deco" trucks.
