= Askam (trucks) =

Turkish truck manufacturer

Askam Kamyon İmalat ve Ticaret A.Ş.
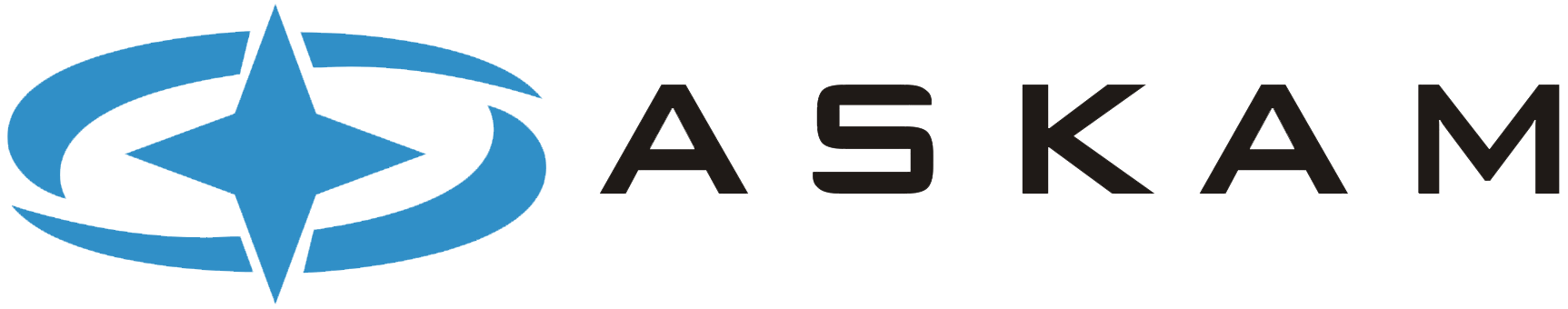
- Formerly: Chrysler Sanayii A.Ş.
- Company type: Joint venture
- Industry: Automotive
- Founded: 1962; 64 years ago
- Defunct: 2015; 11 years ago
- Fate: Filed bankruptcy
- Headquarters: Istanbul, Turkey
- Products: Trucks, vans
- Brands: Dodge; Fargo; DeSoto; Hino
- Parent: Chrysler (1964–78); Tatko, Çiftçiler & Ruşensad (1978–2003); Çiftçiler Holding (2003–2015)
- Website: askam.com.tr

Askam (officially, Askam Kamyon Imalat ve Ticaret AŞ) was a Turkish automotive manufacturer of trucks and commercial vehicles. The company was established as a joint venture with US-based Chrysler under the name of Chrysler Sanayi A.Ş., commercialising its products under the Chrysler, Dodge, Fargo and DeSoto brands. Askam was the largest truck manufacturer in Turkey.

The company, which was also the first truckmaker in Turkey, ceased production in 2011.

== History ==
Askam was founded in 1962 as a joint venture with 60% ownership by Chrysler, the company originally traded under the "Chrysler Sanayi A.Ş." name. Production of trucks started in 1964 under the Chrysler, Fargo, Desoto, and Dodge brand names. Most of the models built utilized a cab and front end developed by Chrysler specifically for manufacture in developing countries. This cab, in modified form, continued to be used by Askam until its bankruptcy.

In 1978, Chrysler sold its share to the local partners and then owners, Tatko, Çiftçiler & Ruşensad. Askam continued production under the Chrysler's license agreement. Most of Askam's products used Perkins diesel engines.

After an agreement signed with Japanese Hino Motors in 1991, Askam started production of mini trucks branded "Hino". When Daimler-Benz and Chrysler merged operations in 1998, Askam changed its name to "Askam Kamyon Imalat ve Ticaret AŞ" in 2002 and continued to produce its products under the Fargo and Desoto brands.

Askam produced a variety of Fargo and Desoto heavy and light trucks of its own designs. The numerical portion of the model names (AS250, AS700, AS950) stand for the payload in metric tonnes (e.g. 2.5, 7.0, and 9.5 tonnes). In 2003, Çiftçiler Holding became the only owner of the company after acquiring Tatko and Ruşensad shares.

The last trucks were produced in 2011, and attempts were made to sell or revive the company. While trying to buy Askam from Renault Trucks and Temsa, cooperation with the Chinese truck manufacturer Sinotruk came to the forefront; however, none of the opportunities materialized. Askam filed bankruptcy in 2015.

== Products ==
=== Trucks ===
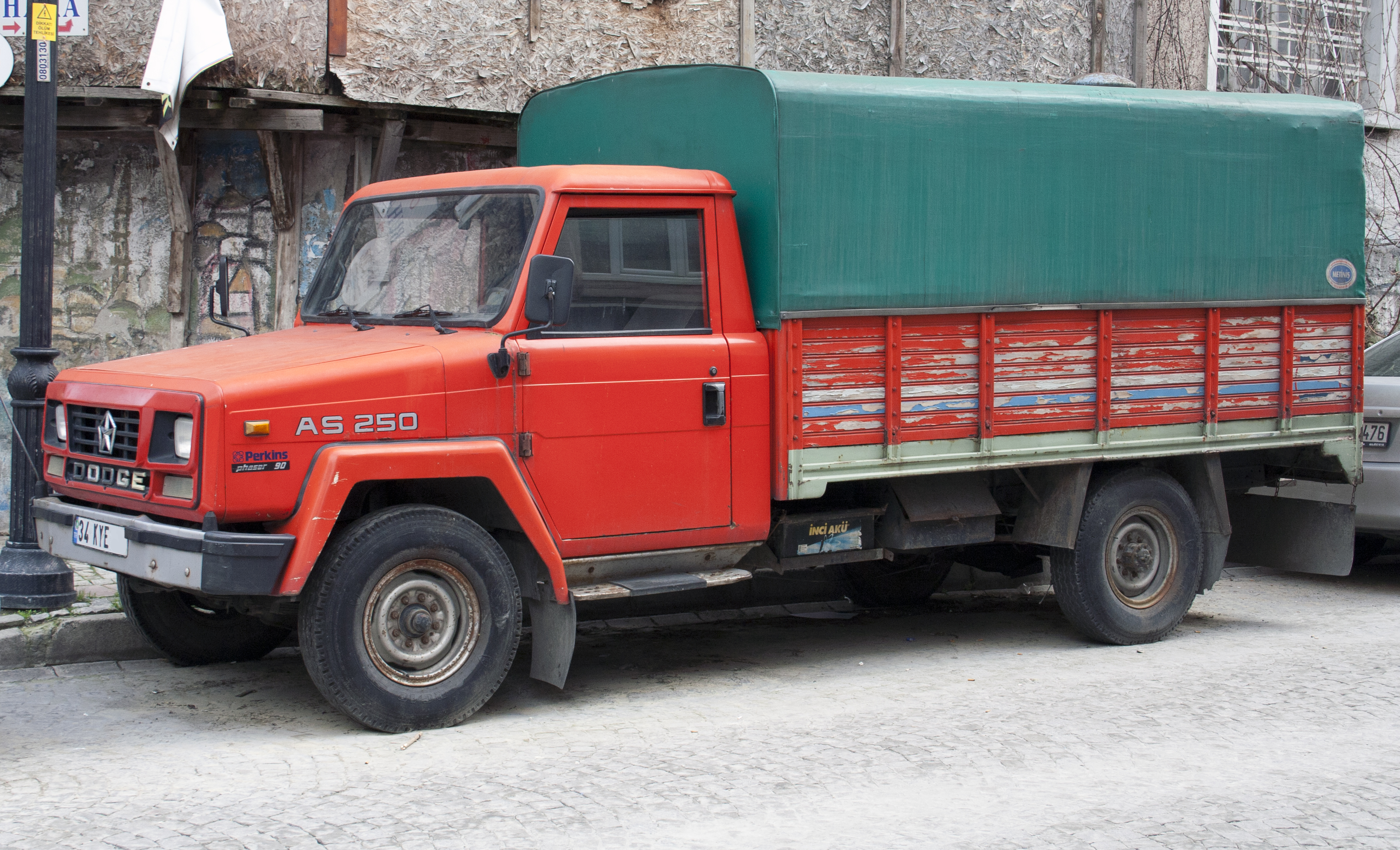
Dodge AS250 (~1990-2002)

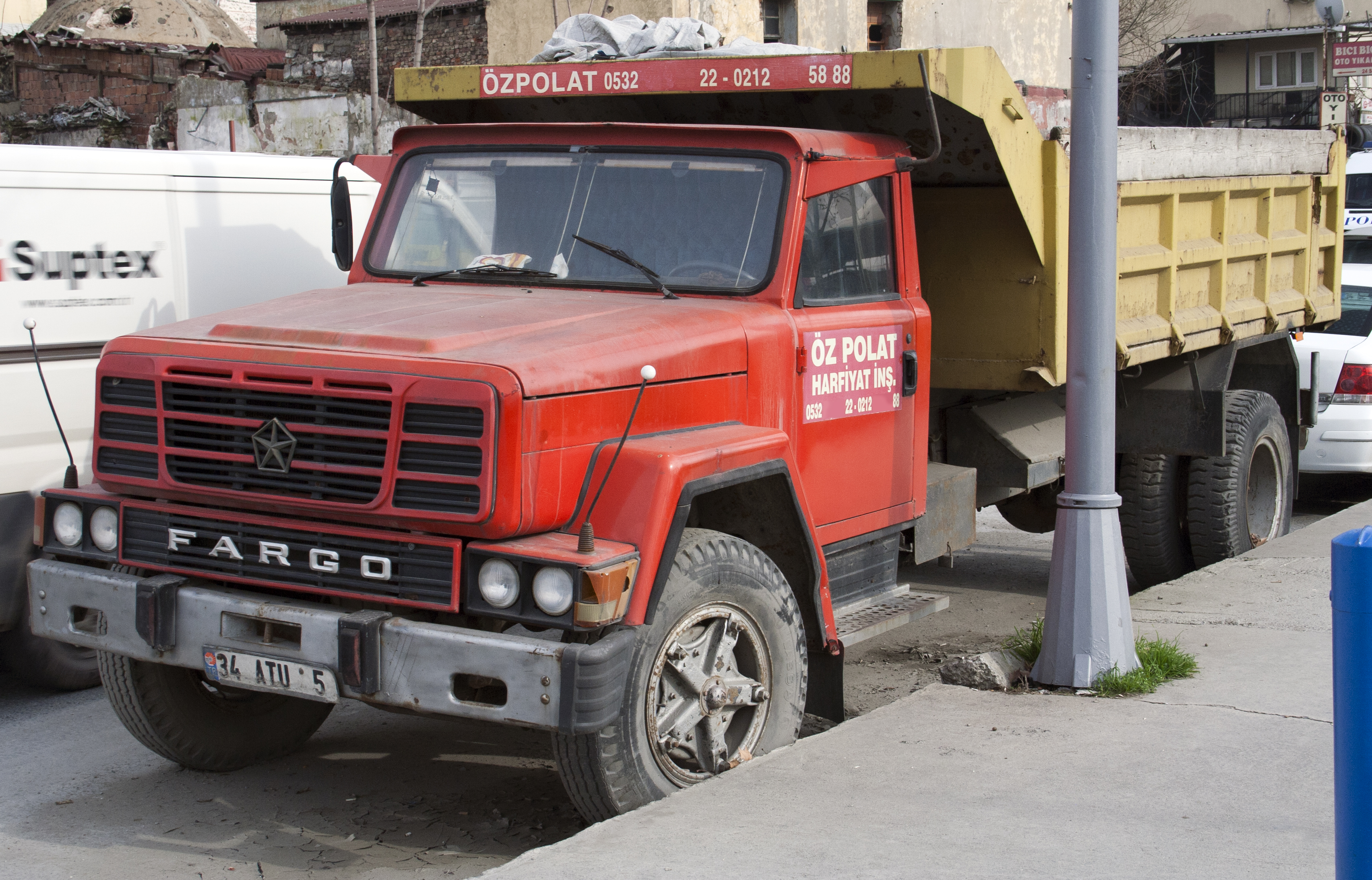
Fargo AS700

- Hi-Ex
- 8 Litre
- AS 700 (DeSoto, Dodge, Fargo)
- AS 950 (DeSoto, Fargo)

=== Light commercial ===
- Fargo Fora
- AS 250 (DeSoto, Dodge, Fargo)
- AS 250D

=== Other ===
- AS 250 Safari

== See also ==
- List of companies of Turkey
