= Nissan Pathfinder =

SUV series produced by Nissan

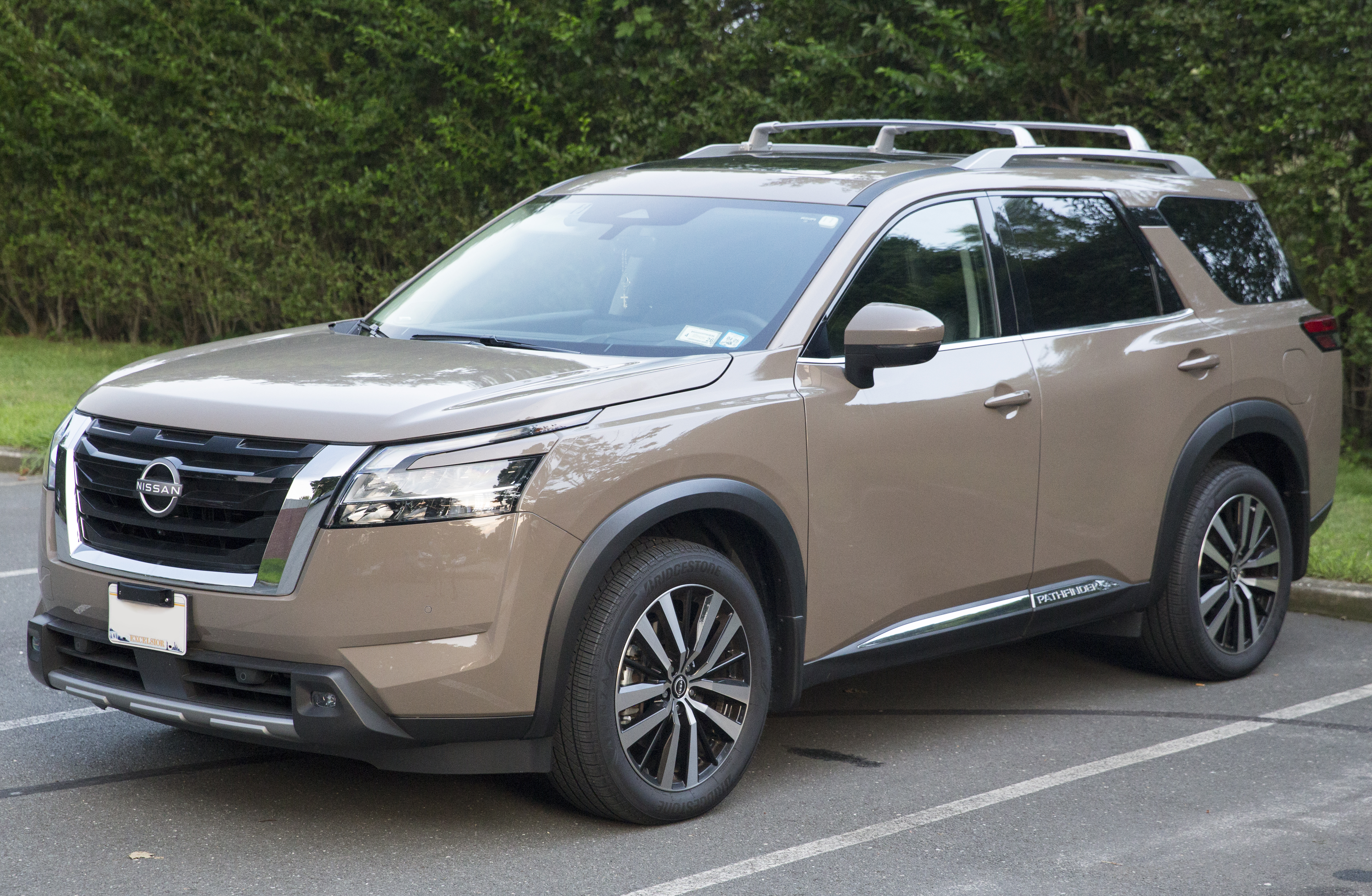
- 2023 Nissan Pathfinder Platinum 4WD (R53, US)

Overview
- Manufacturer: Nissan
- Also called: Nissan Terrano (1985–2004)
- Production: 1985–present

Body and chassis
- Layout: Front-engine, rear-wheel-drive (1985–2014); Front-engine, front-wheel-drive (2012–present); Front-engine, four-wheel-drive (1985–present)
- Chassis: Body-on-frame (1985–1995, 2005–2014); Unibody (1995–2004, 2012–present)

Chronology
- Predecessor: Nissan Bushmaster; Nissan Terrano II (Europe)
- Successor: Nissan Xterra (for WD21 model, as a compact SUV); Nissan Terra (for R51 model, as a body-on-frame SUV)

The Nissan Pathfinder is a range of sport utility vehicles manufactured by Nissan since 1985. Until the third-generation model, the Pathfinder is based on Nissan's compact pickup truck platform which it shares with the Navara/Frontier.

The Pathfinder was marketed as the Nissan Terrano (Japanese: 日産・テラノ, Hepburn: Nissan Terano) outside North America. Beginning in 2004, the vehicles were marketed globally as the Pathfinder.

In 2012, the R52 series Pathfinder was released as a three-row crossover SUV based on the unibody Nissan D platform, moving away from the body-on-frame chassis format. The role of a mid-size body-on-frame SUV in Nissan's global lineup was passed to the Terra/X-Terra, which was released in 2018 and based on the D23 series Navara.

== First generation (YD21/WD21; 1985) ==
First generation
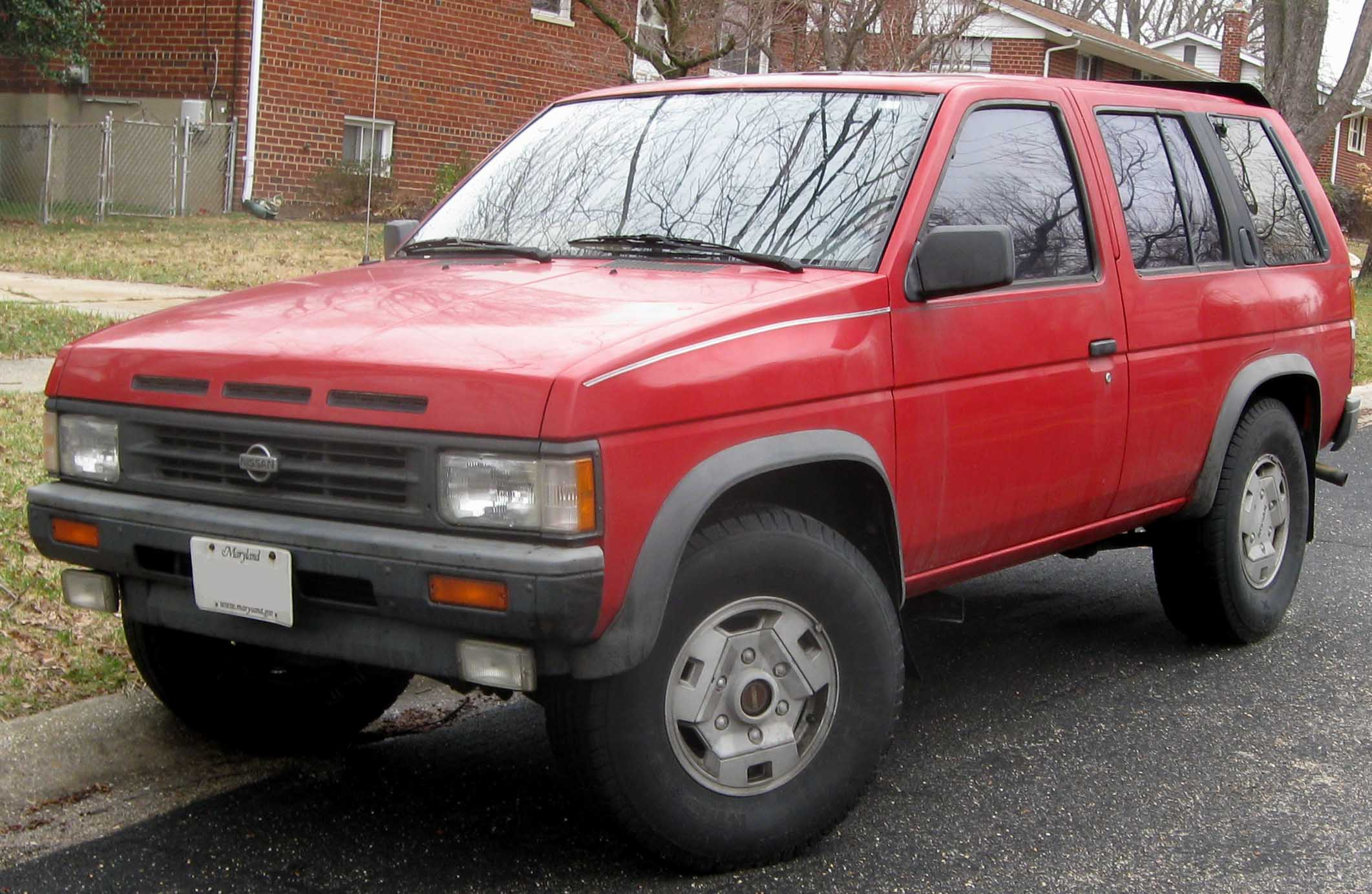

Overview
- Model code: YD21; WD21
- Also called: Nissan Terrano; Nissan Terramax
- Production: April 1985 – September 1995; 1995–2006 (Indonesia)
- Model years: 1987–1995
- Assembly: Japan: Kanda, Fukuoka (Nissan Shatai); Malaysia: Kuala Lumpur (Tan Chong Motor Assemblies); Indonesia: Jakarta (Indomobil); Purwakarta (NMI)
- Designer: Doug Wilson; Jerry Hirshberg (1982, 1983)

Body and chassis
- Class: Compact SUV
- Body style: 2-door SUV (1985–1990); 4-door SUV (1989–1995)
- Layout: Front-engine, rear-wheel-drive; Front-engine, four-wheel-drive
- Platform: WD21
- Chassis: Body-on-frame
- Related: Nissan D21 Pickup

Powertrain
- Engine: Petrol: 2.4 L Z24i I4; 2.4 L KA24E I4; 3.0 L VG30i/VG30E V6 (HYD21); Diesel: 2.7 L TD27 I4 (BYD21); 2.7 L TD27T2/T4 turbo I4 (BYD21)
- Transmission: 3-speed 3N71 automatic (1985–1987); 4-speed 4N71 automatic; 4-speed RL4R01A automatic; 4-speed RE4R01A automatic; 5-speed manual

Dimensions
- Wheelbase: 2,650 mm (104.3 in)
- Length: 4,365 mm (171.9 in) (early); 4,510 mm (177.6 in) (late); 4,715 mm (185.6 in) (Wide)
- Width: 1,690 mm (66.5 in); 1,795 mm (70.7 in) (Wide)
- Height: XE: 1,669 mm (65.7 in); 1985–89 SE & LE: 1,679 mm (66.1 in); 1990–95 SE: 1,694 mm (66.7 in)

Chronology
- Successor: Nissan Xterra (as a compact SUV)

The first generation Pathfinder was unveiled in May 1985 and was later introduced in July 1986 as a two-door body-on-frame SUV, for the 1987 model year in the United States. It shared styling and most components with the Nissan Hardbody Truck. Built on a ladder-type frame, the Pathfinder was Nissan's response to the Chevrolet Blazer, Ford Bronco II, Jeep Cherokee, and non-American SUVs like the Toyota 4Runner, Honda Passport, and the Isuzu MU.

Before the Pathfinder there was the Nissan Bushmaster (an aftermarket conversion of the Datsun Truck). Its optional 4WD system that could be engaged electronically while the vehicle was moving was unique at the time. All YD21 Pathfinders were available in both 2WD and manually engaged 4WD configurations, with base models installed with a 2.4 L four-cylinder engine. In certain countries, this generation also came with a 2.7-litre I4 diesel engine known as the TD27 with the option of a turbocharger installed later in November 1988.

In Japan, it was exclusive to Nissan Shop locations, where it was called the Terrano and served as a smaller companion to the larger Nissan Safari. While the Pathfinder/Terrano was essentially based on the newly introduced Hardbody truck, the rear five-link coil suspension was borrowed from the Safari to enhance its off-road abilities. In addition to the Station Wagon version (two or later four doors), the home market also received a version intended for commercial use called the "Estate Van" (chassis codes beginning with the letter "V"). The two-door version was available with the Nissan VG30i V6, which produces 140 PS (103 kW) at 4800 rpm in Japanese market specifications.

As the Japanese market Terrano was regarded as a luxury vehicle, with an emphasis on outdoor leisure activities, the Terrano was introduced to Japanese buyers as an off-road, back-country Fairlady ZX. To emphasize this marketing approach, the Terrano was available with options not normally found on other budget-minded vehicles. Some of the upmarket Japanese-model options were climate-controlled air conditioning, electrically powered windows, seats, door locks, and, in 1993, Recaro seats. Nissan's sports division Autech added special equipment packages, introducing the "Wide R3M Urban" and the "AJ Limited". The "Wide" models used overfenders and larger bumpers which made their exterior dimensions exceed dimension regulations, thus incurring a higher annual road tax obligation. The Wide models were given the leading letter "L" in their model codes. The emphasis on luxury was partly due to a strong economy in Japan, in what is then regarded as the Japanese "bubble economy".

In 1985, the first generation Terrano was entered in the ninth Paris to Dakar rally race, with continued entries in rally races for many years, winning multiple times in its category.

The four-door Pathfinder was introduced in October 1989 to enhance the Pathfinder's market appeal, but the wheelbase and overall vehicle length were not extended to accommodate the rear doors. At its introduction to North America, 1985 to 1989 Pathfinders all came with a two-door body. For 1990 it became four door-only, although a small number of US 1990 Pathfinders came with the two-door body.

When the four-door version was introduced, Nissan chose to conceal the door handles as a part of the "C" pillar trim to make it appear like a two-door truck with a camper shell, with the conventional door handles on the front doors. This design tradition was used on all Nissan SUVs, including the Nissan Armada, Nissan Juke, Nissan Terrano II, and the Nissan Xterra. The front doors were slightly shortened to accommodate the rear doors.

From 1987 to 1989 Pathfinders were available with either the Nissan VG30i 3.0 L V6 (143 hp (107 kW), 162 lb⋅ft (220 N⋅m) torque), or the Nissan Z24i 2.4 L with 106 hp (79 kW) I4 (the same engine choices as the Nissan Hardbody Truck). For 1990, the V6 received an upgrade from throttle body injection to a multi point fuel injection system. This engine was known as the VG30E, and was rated at 153 hp (114 kW) and 180 lb⋅ft (244 N⋅m) torque. Also in 1990, the Z24i was replaced with the KA24E. The first generation continued until 1995.

The first generation Nissan Pathfinder also sold in Indonesia from 1995 to 2006 as Nissan Terrano. Only available with four-door body, 2389 cc Z24 carburetted petrol engine (103 hp & 182Nm), 2WD (4WD only available for 1995-1996 highest trim model) and 5-speed manual transmission. Only 17,801 units were sold during 11 years of production.

=== Facelifts ===
A facelift occurred in 1990 when the 4-door model was introduced. The front grille was revised, numerous interior trim level options became available and numerous exterior packages were offered by dealerships. The 1993 models received a third brake light and the 1994 models received a curved dashboard. Two more facelifts occurred for Indonesian production Terrano in 1997 and 2003.

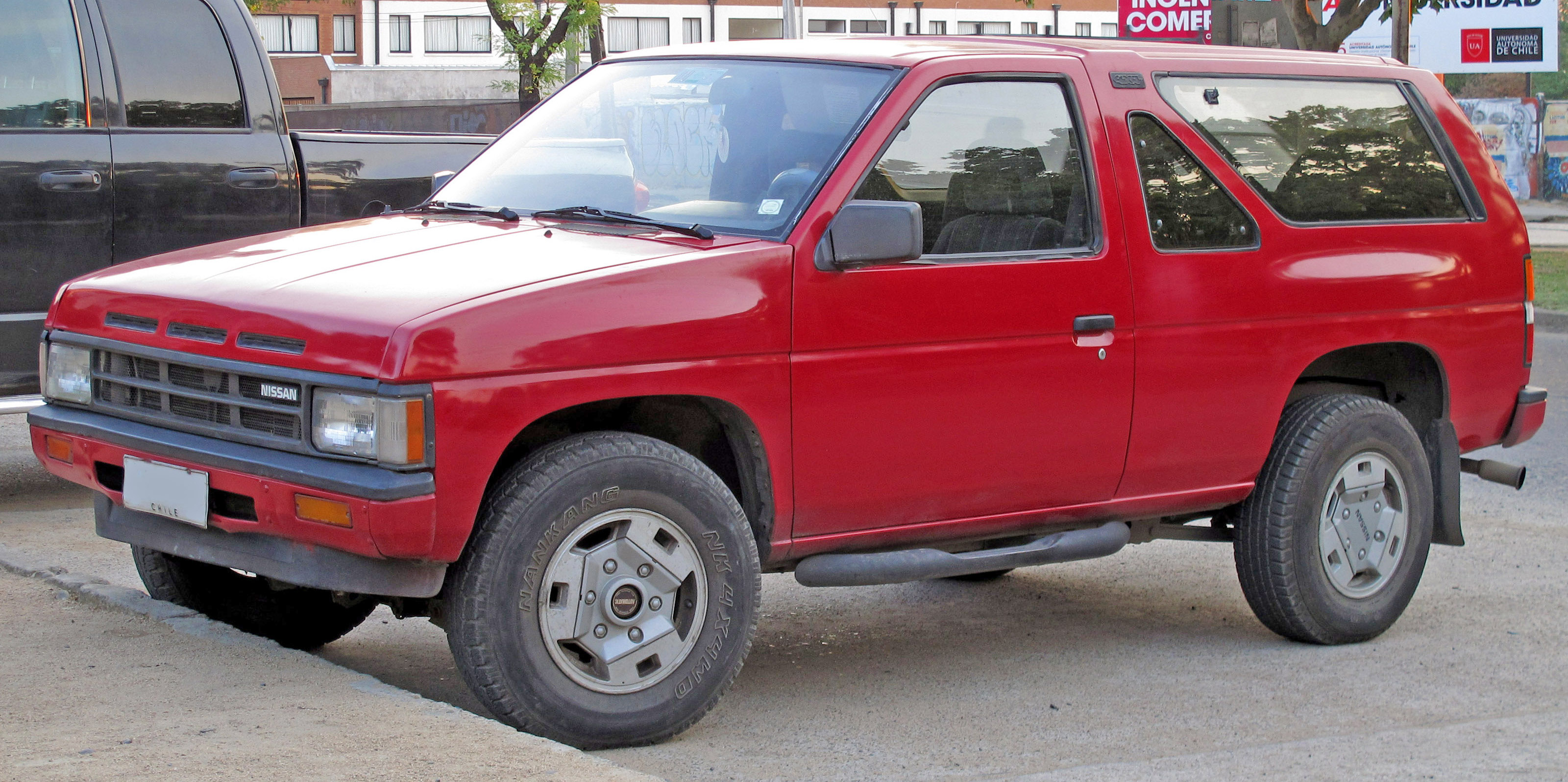
1987–1990 Nissan Pathfinder 2-door

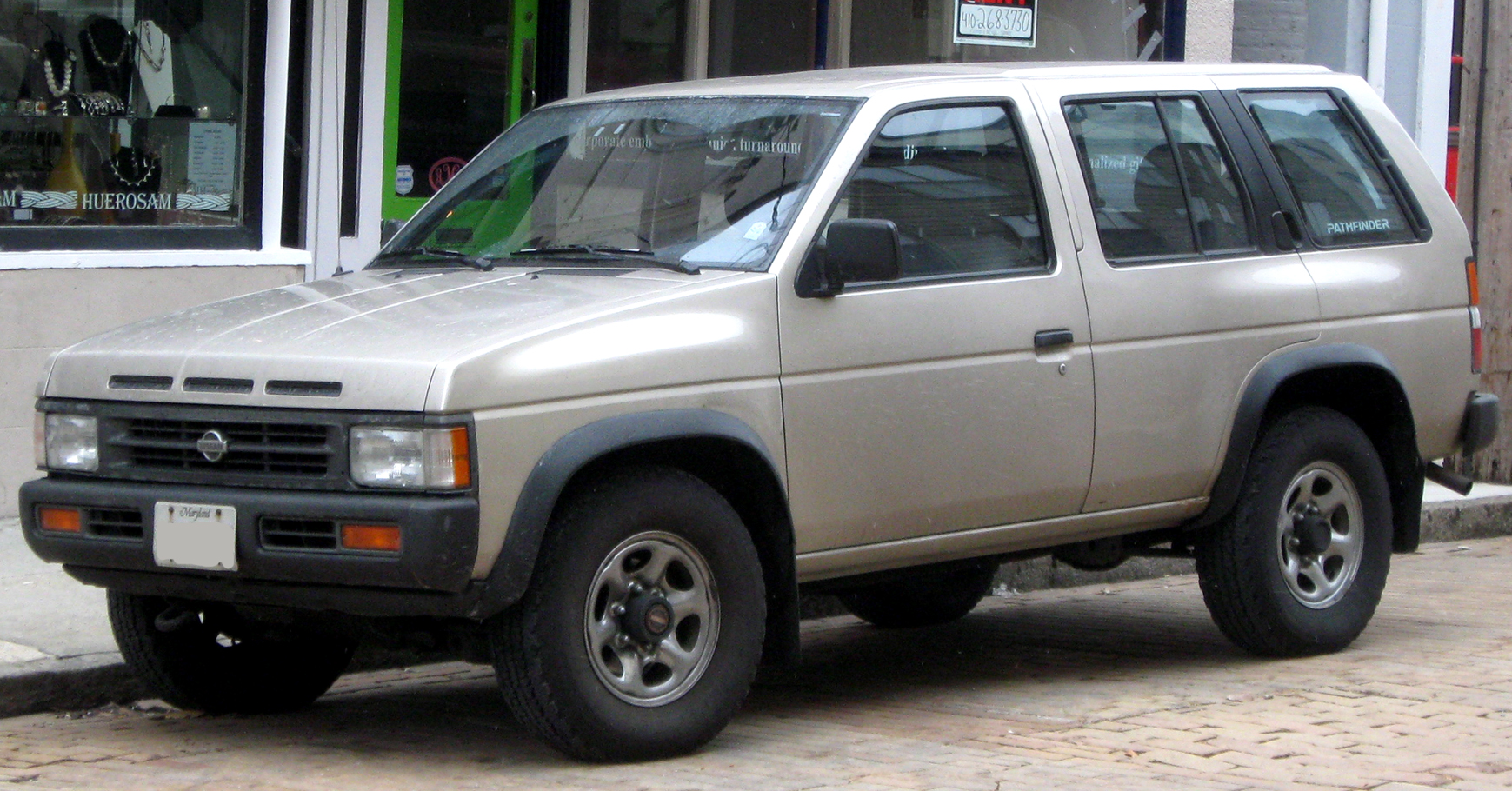
1986–1995 Nissan Pathfinder 4-door

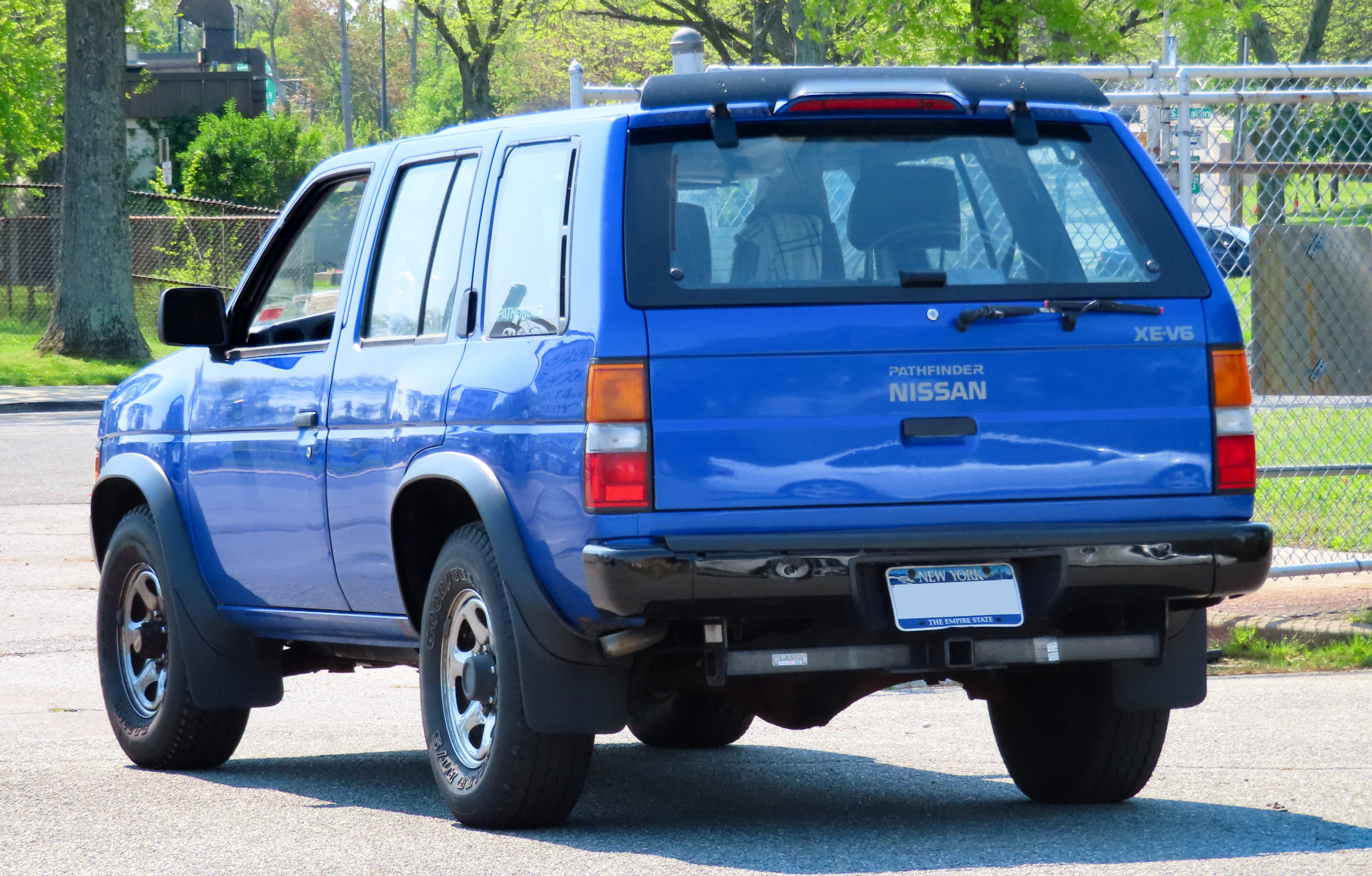
1990–1995 Nissan Pathfinder 4-door

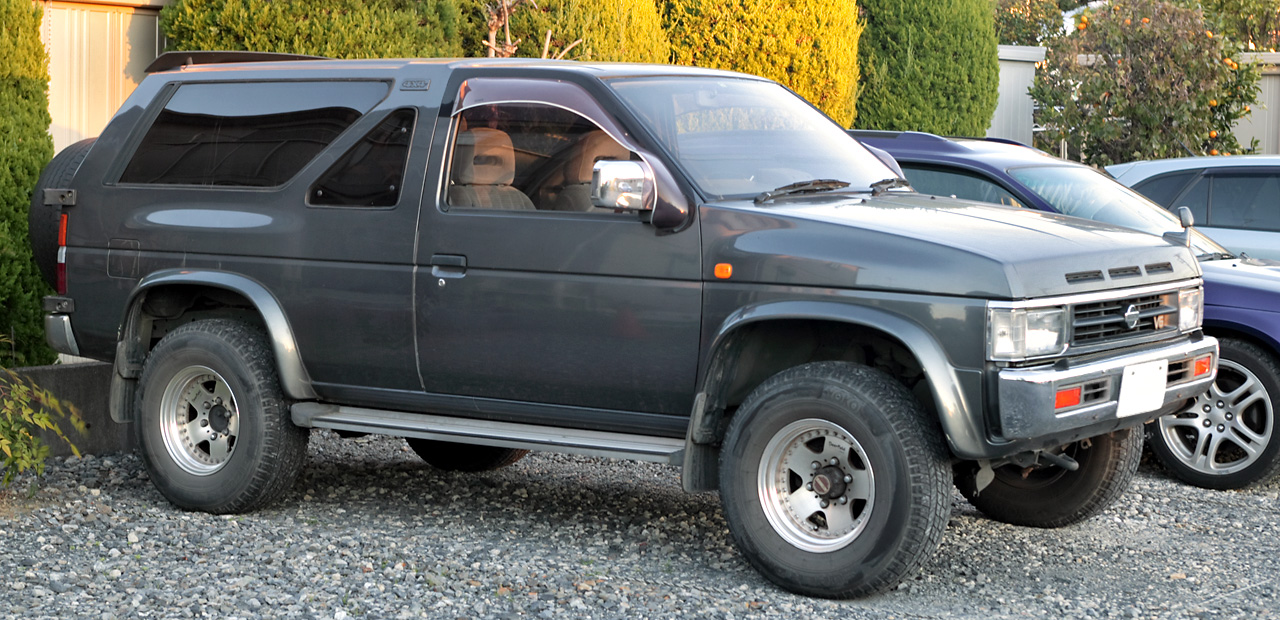
Nissan Terrano D21

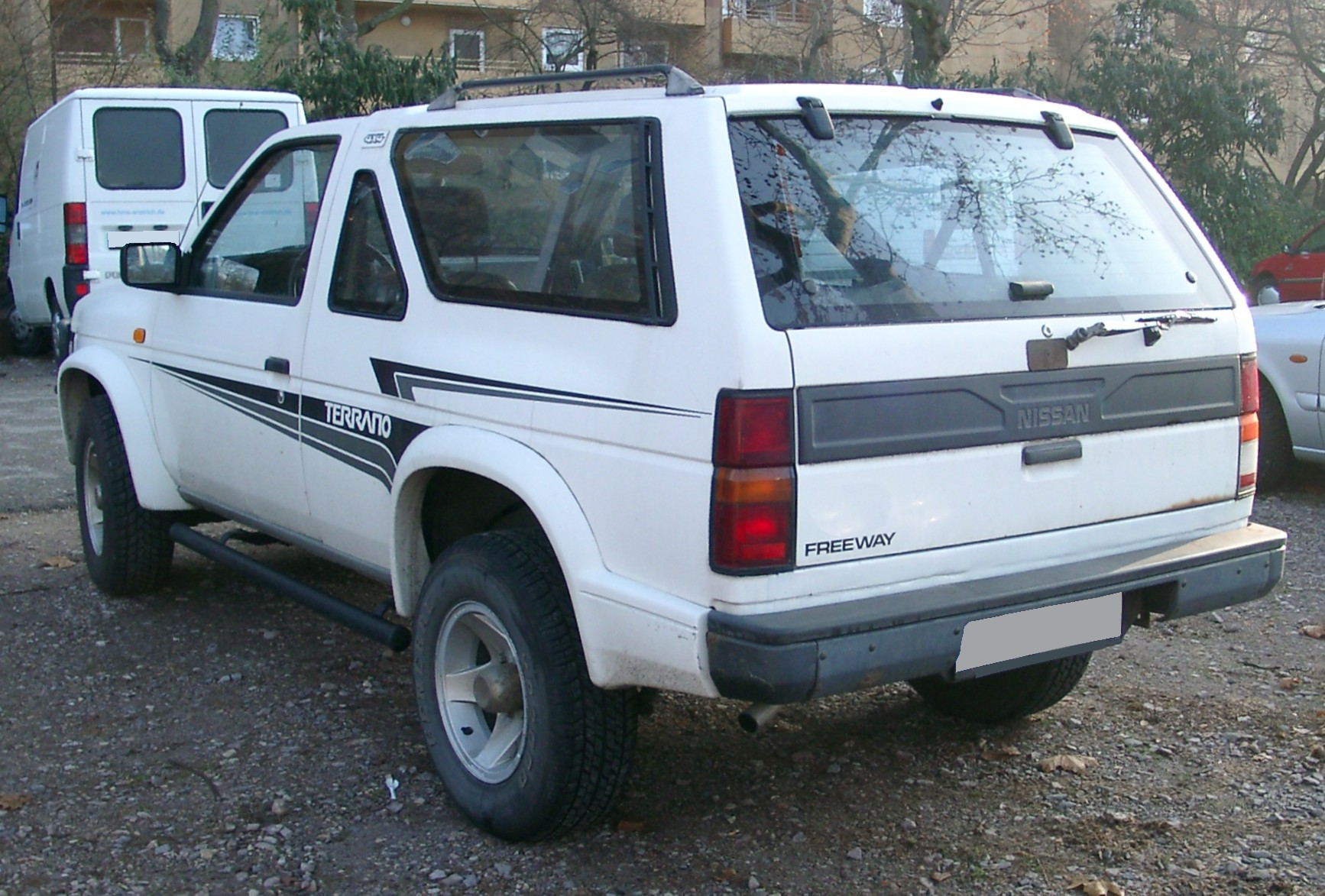
Nissan Terrano Freeway

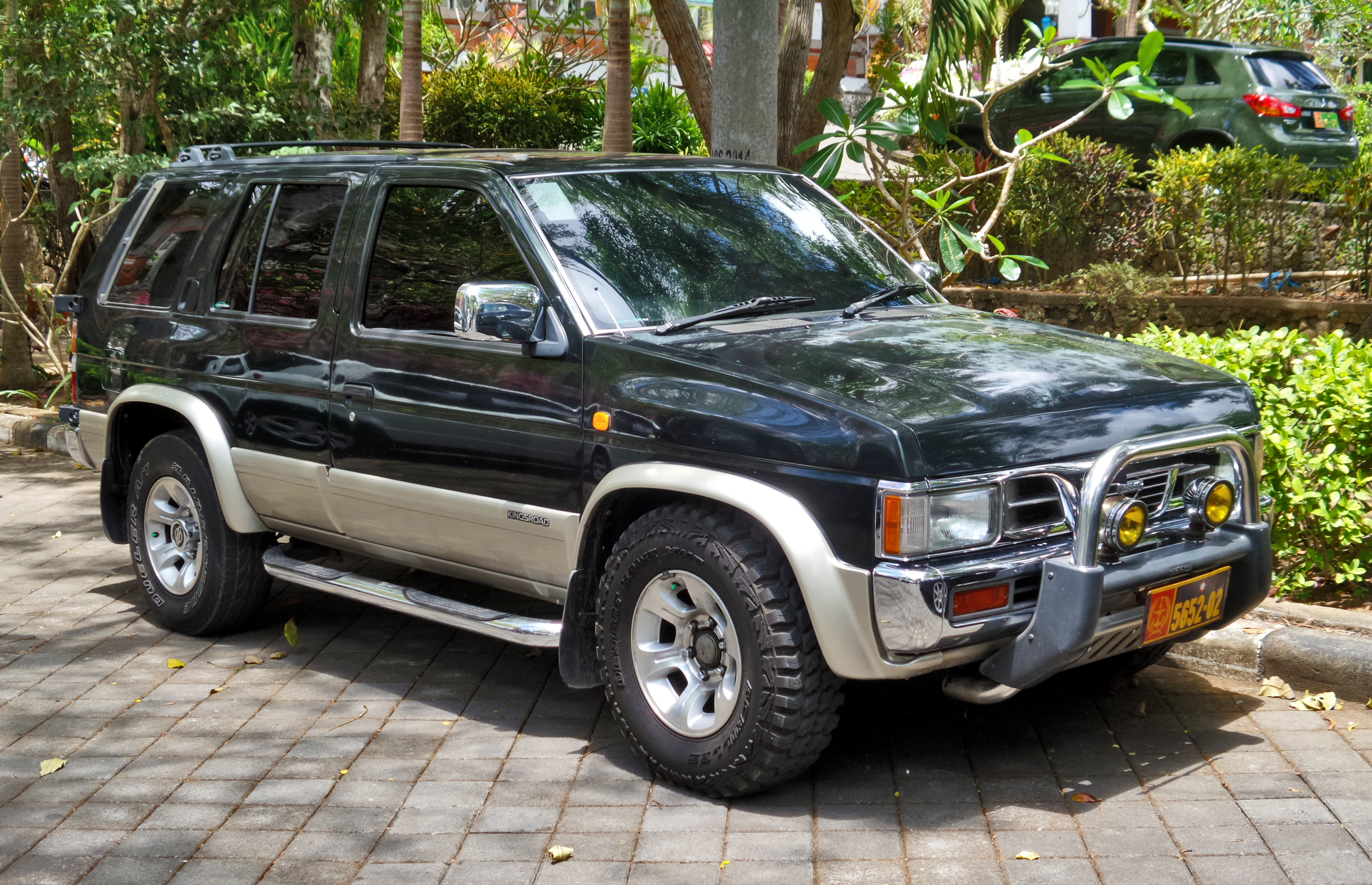
1996–2003 Nissan Terrano Kingsroad (Indonesia)

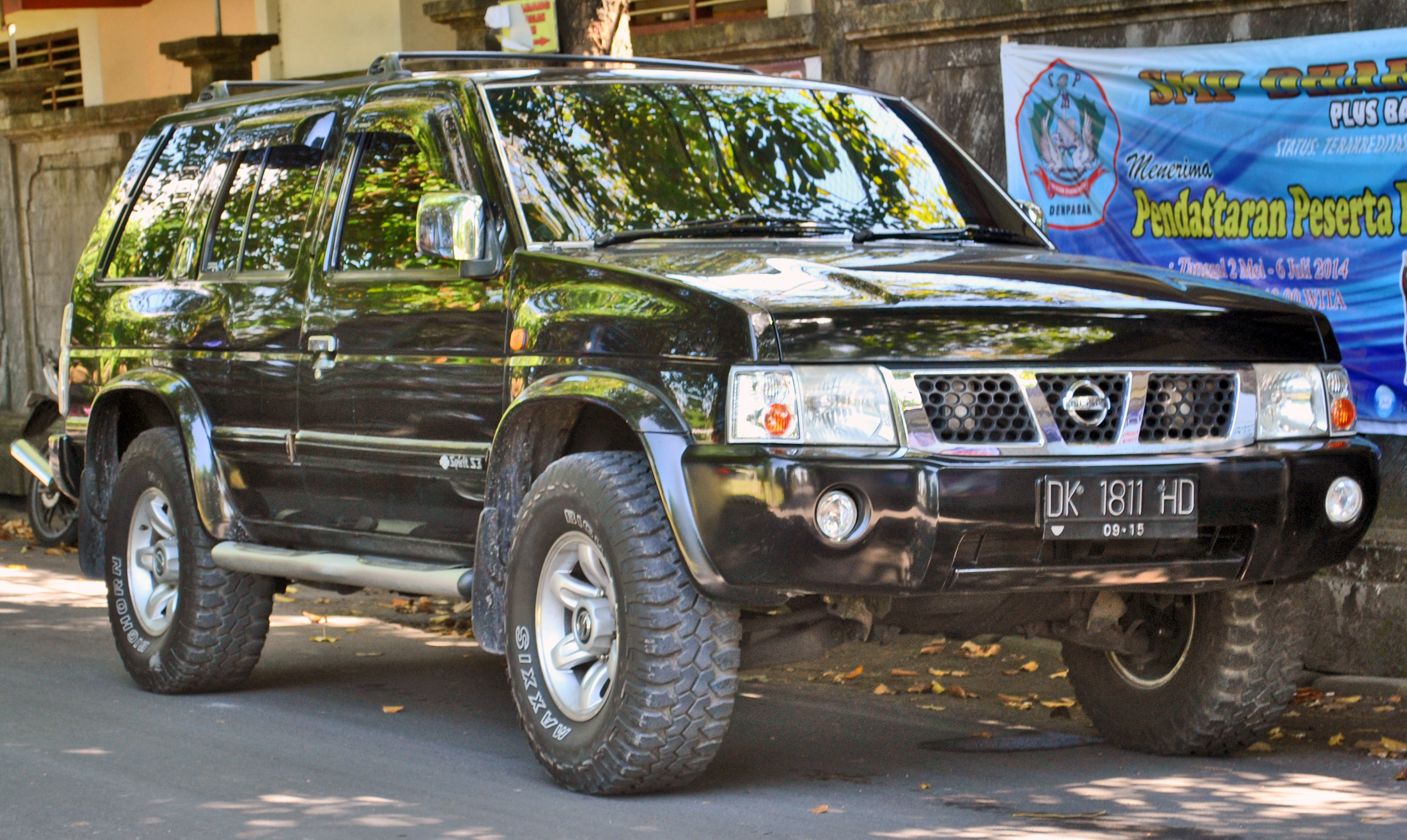
2003–2006 Nissan Terrano Spirit S3 (front, Indonesia)

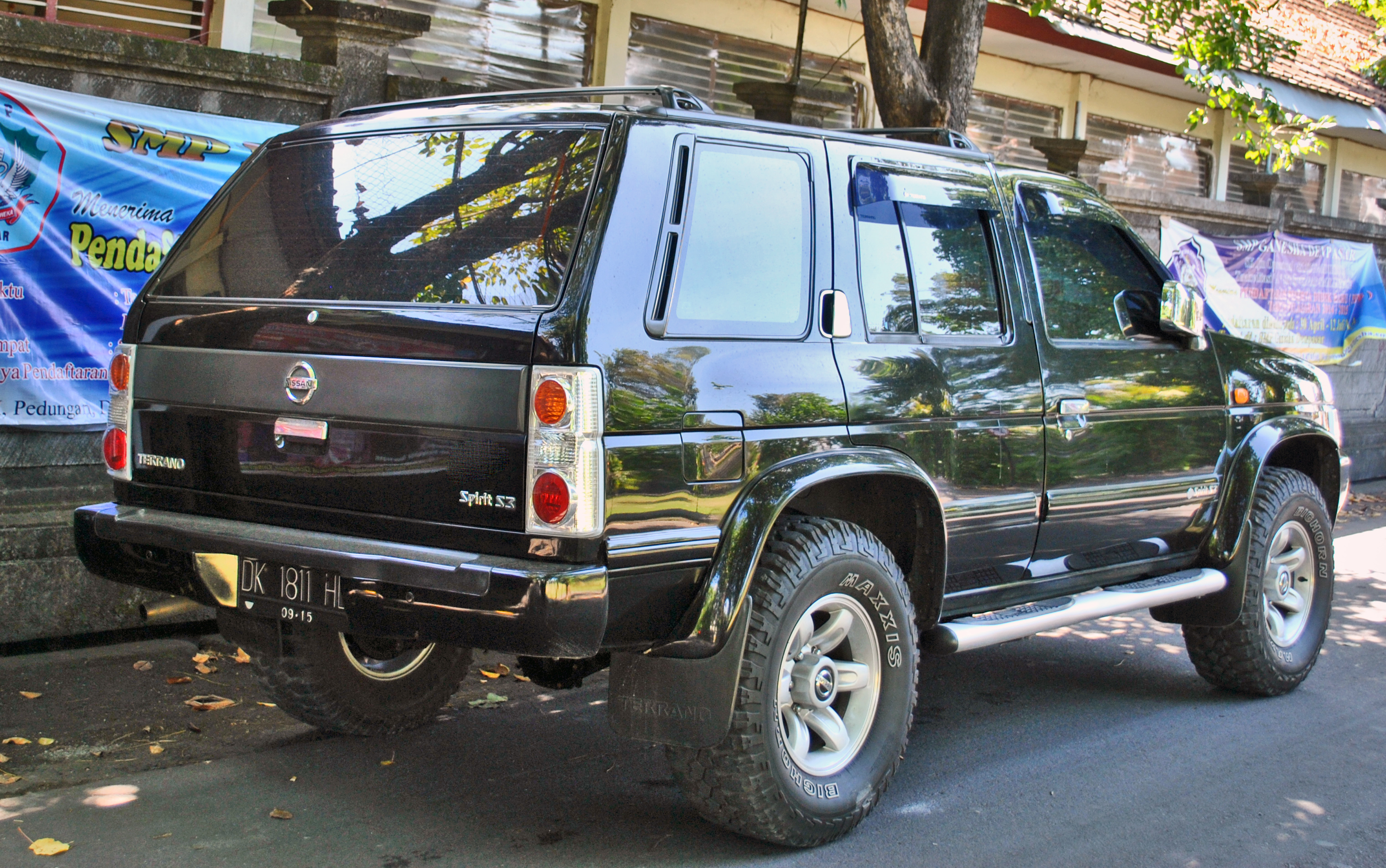
Nissan Terrano Spirit S3 with new crystal rear lights (rear, Indonesia)

== Second generation (R50; 1995) ==
Second generation
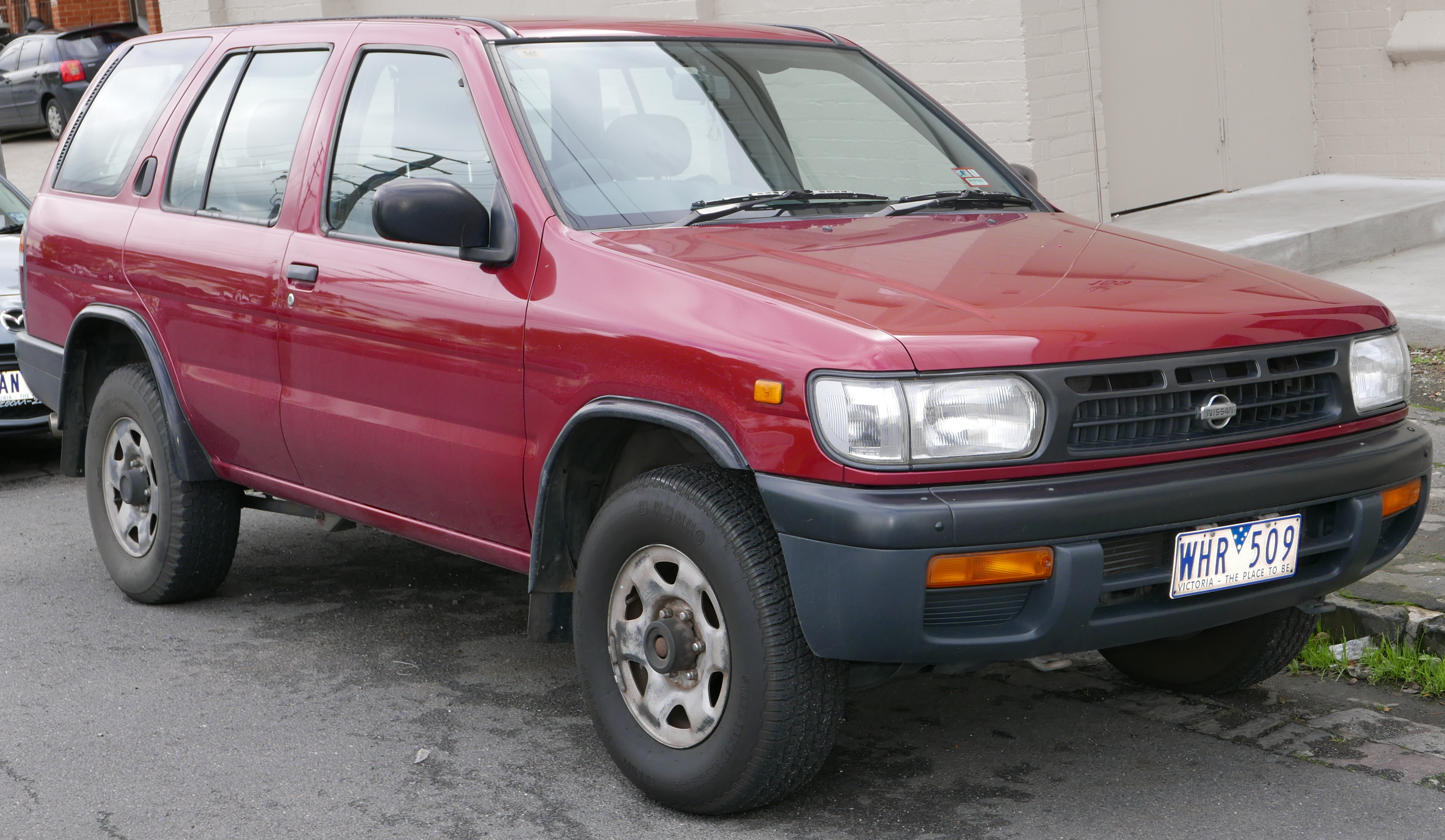

Overview
- Model code: R50
- Also called: Nissan Terrano Regulus; Infiniti QX4
- Production: October 1995 – August 2004
- Model years: 1996–2004
- Assembly: Japan: Nissan Shatai, Kanda, Fukuoka; Spain: Barcelona
- Designer: Jerry Hirshberg; Yoshio Maezawa (1992, facelift: 1997)

Body and chassis
- Class: Mid-size SUV
- Body style: 5-door SUV
- Layout: Front-engine, rear-wheel-drive; Front-engine, four-wheel-drive
- Chassis: Unibody

Powertrain
- Engine: Petrol: 3.3 L VG33E V6; 3.5 L VQ35DE DOHC 24V V6; Diesel: 2.7 L TD27ETi OHV turbo I4; 3.0 L ZD30DDTi DOHC 16V turbo I4; 3.2 L QD32ETi OHV turbo I4
- Transmission: 4-speed automatic; 5-speed manual

Dimensions
- Wheelbase: 2,700 mm (106.3 in)
- Length: 1999–2002: 4,529 mm (178.3 in); 2000–04: 4,641 mm (182.7 in)
- Width: 2000–04: 1,821 mm (71.7 in); 2000–04 XE: 1,770 mm (69.7 in); 1996–99: 1,839 mm (72.4 in); 1999–2002 XE: 1,745 mm (68.7 in)
- Height: 2003–04 SE: 1,847 mm (72.7 in); 2000–04 LE & 2000–01 SE: 1,801 mm (70.9 in); 2000–01 XE: 1,725 mm (67.9 in); 1999–2002 XE & 1998–99 LE: 1,704 mm (67.1 in); 1999–2002 SE & 1999–2000 LE: 1,725 mm (67.9 in)

The second generation Pathfinder was introduced in late 1995 with revised styling. The engine was upgraded to the VG33E, with 168 hp (125 kW) and 196 lb⋅ft (266 N⋅m) torque. For the 1999 1/2 model year, the Pathfinder was freshened. In the year 2000 for the 2001 model year brought a new 240 hp (179 kW) V6 engine (for the automatic transmission models). The manual transmission models boasted 250 hp (186 kW) and 240-lbft of torque. This engine was the VQ35DE. The 4-cylinder engine option was no longer available, and diesel engines continued to be used in Japanese and European models.

As of the 2002 model year, the Terrano / Pathfinder was no longer marketed in Japan, and was available in North America, Europe and the Middle East. The market position held by the Terrano in Japan was replaced by the Nissan Murano in 2002. The Japanese market Terrano and luxurious Terrano Regulus saw demand drop significantly due to the hard economic times felt in Japan, known as the Lost Decade. Nissan offered a smaller, off-road vehicle to its Japanese customer base who enjoyed the Pathfinder when it introduced the Nissan X-Trail in 2000.

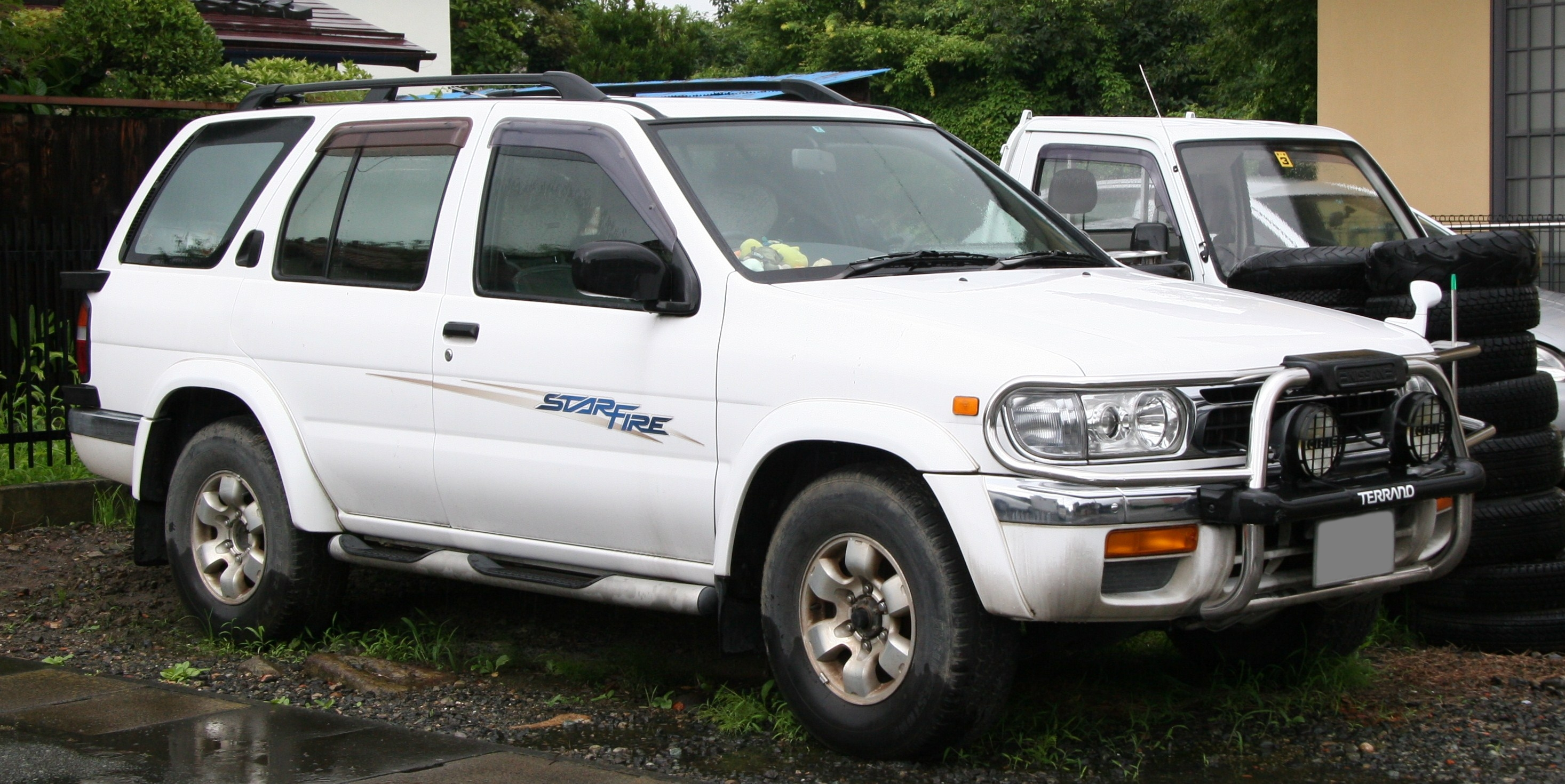
Nissan Terrano StarFire

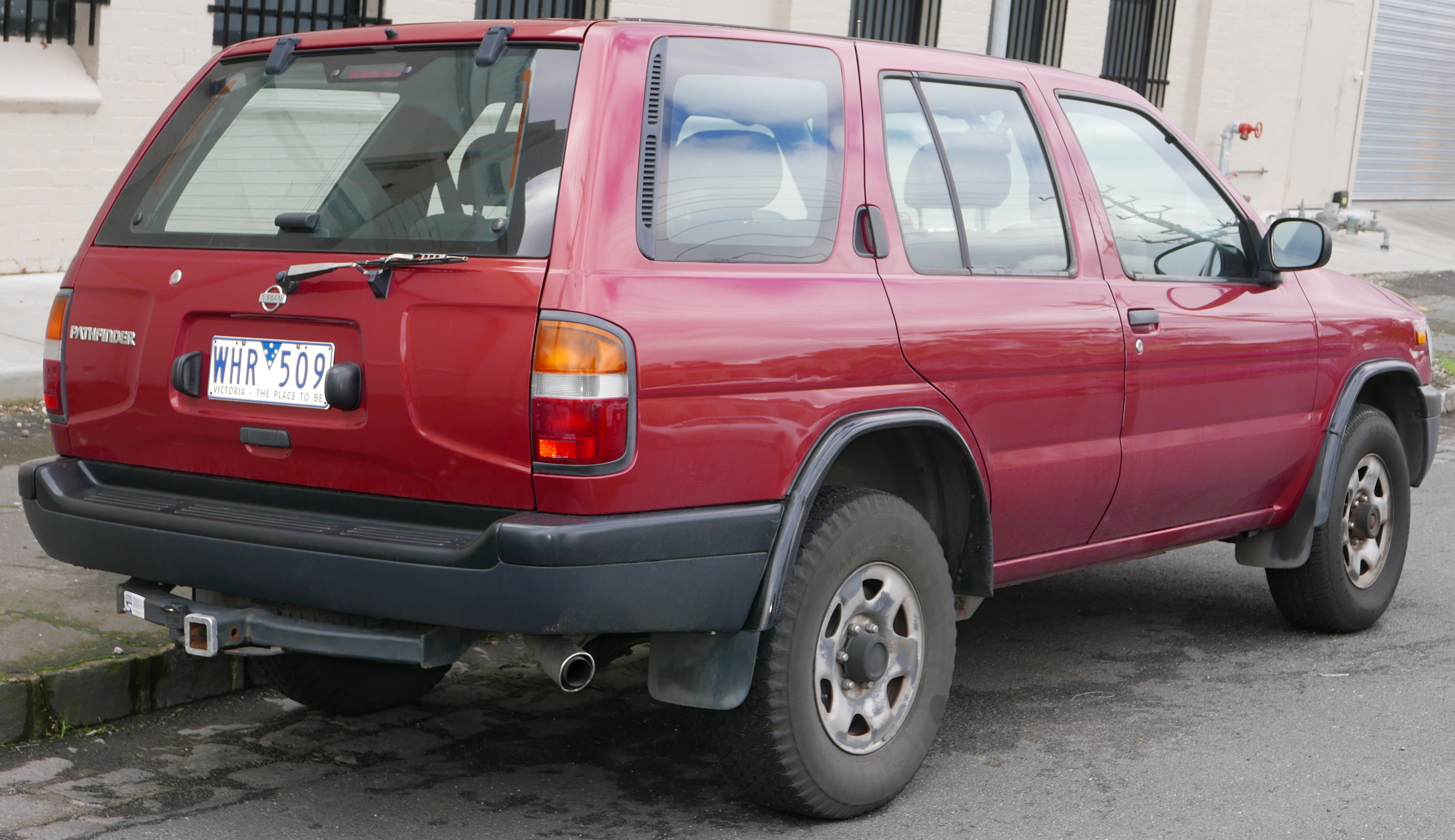
1997 Nissan Pathfinder RX (Australia)

=== Facelifts ===
The Pathfinder received a facelift in 1998 for the 1999.5 model year with a revised front fascia, rear fascia, and interior — followed by another facelift occurred in 2001 for the 2002 model year, receiving the updated Nissan logo, a revised grille, as well as a new steering wheel, different rims and radio display. In 2002 for the 2003 model year, the Pathfinder again received a new steering wheel.

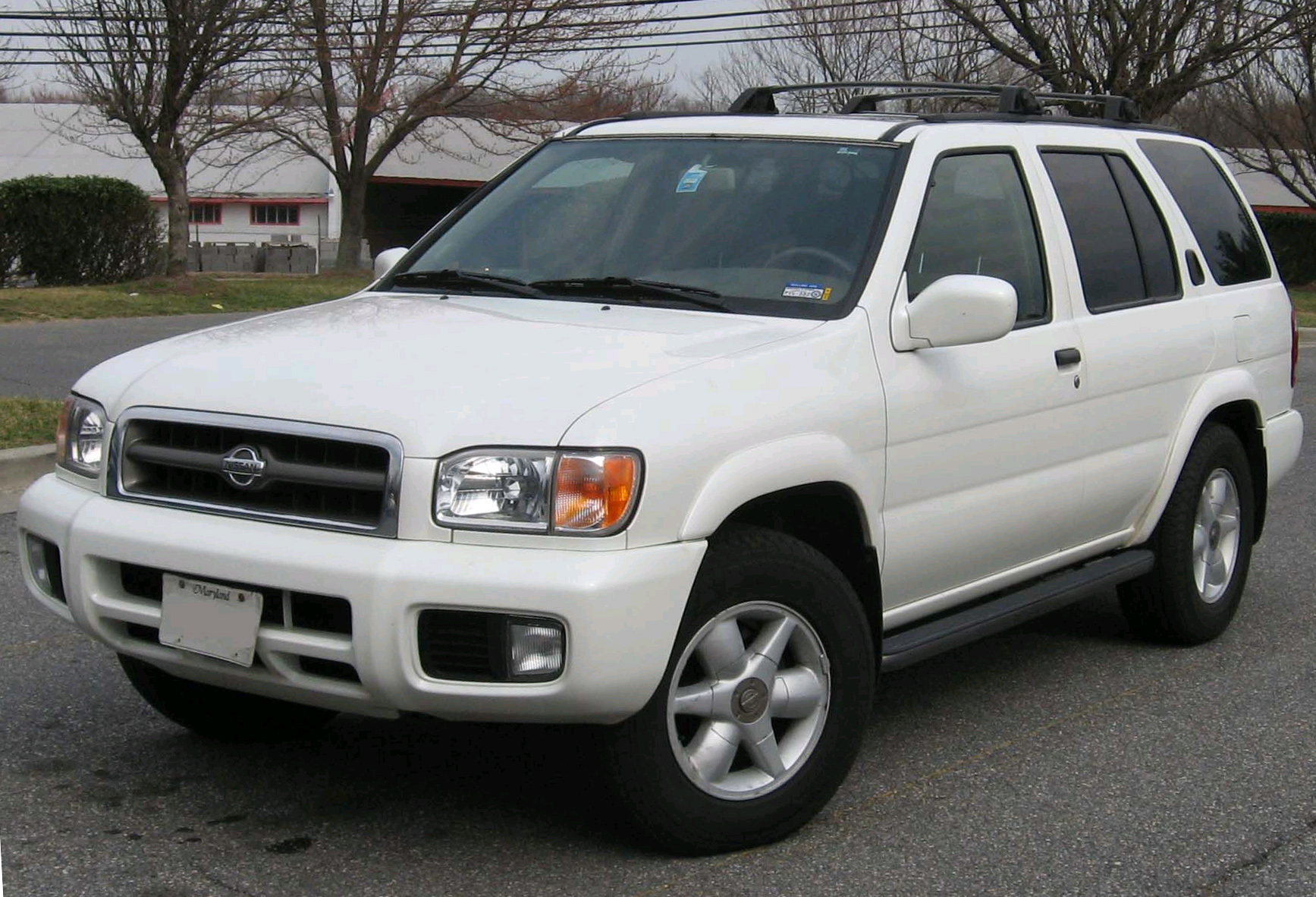
1999–2001 Nissan Pathfinder

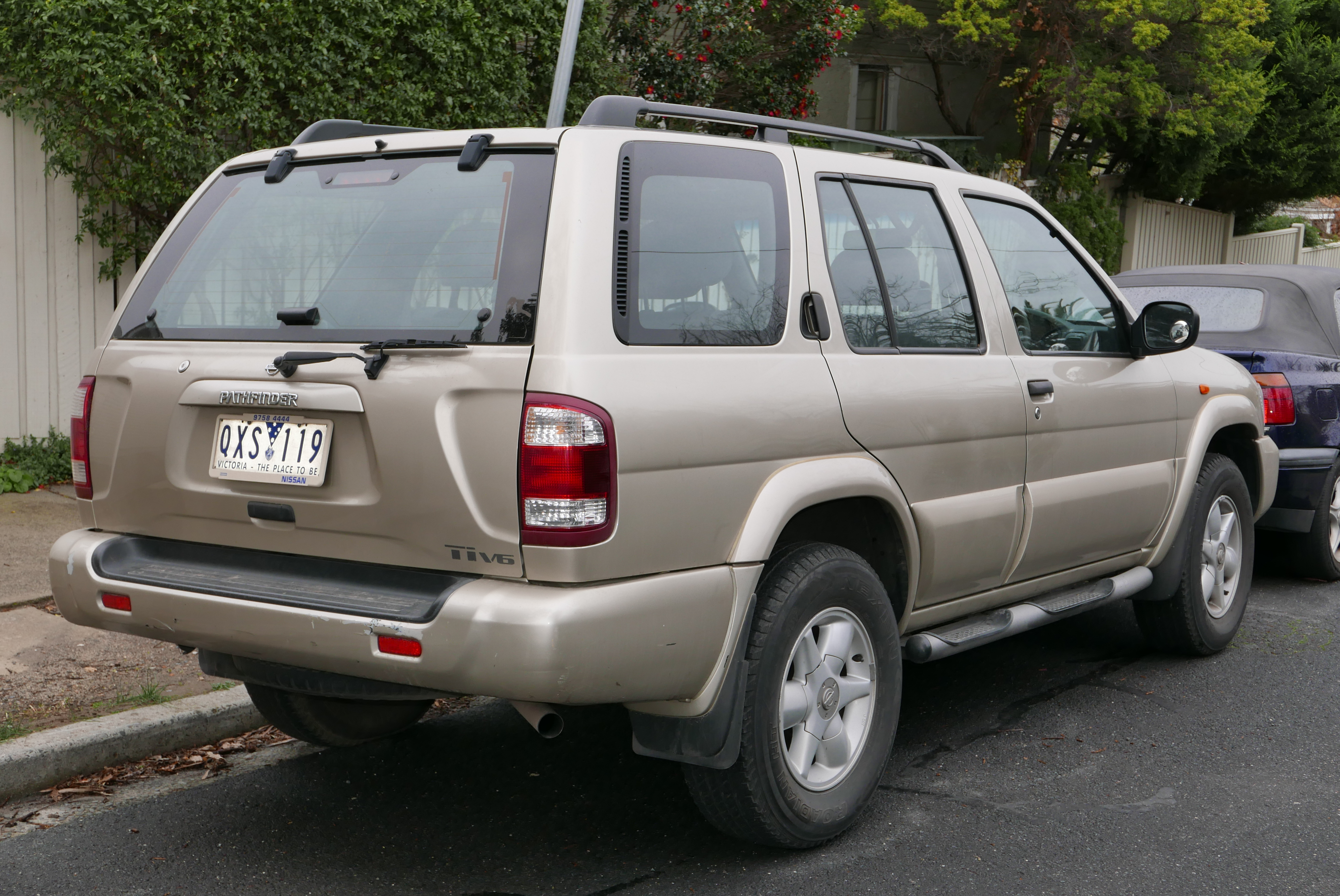
2001 Nissan Pathfinder Ti (Australia)

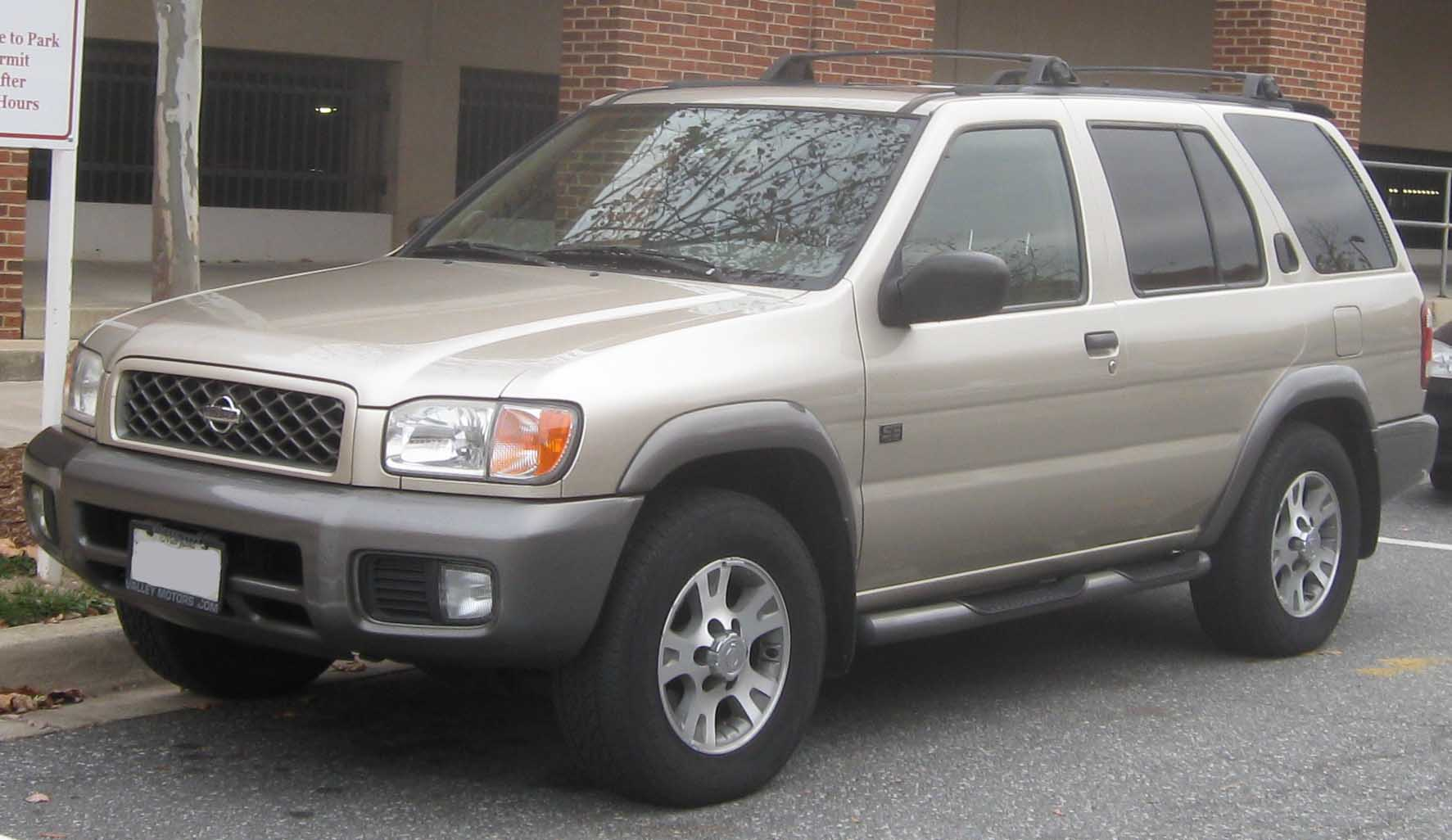
1999–2001 Nissan Pathfinder SE

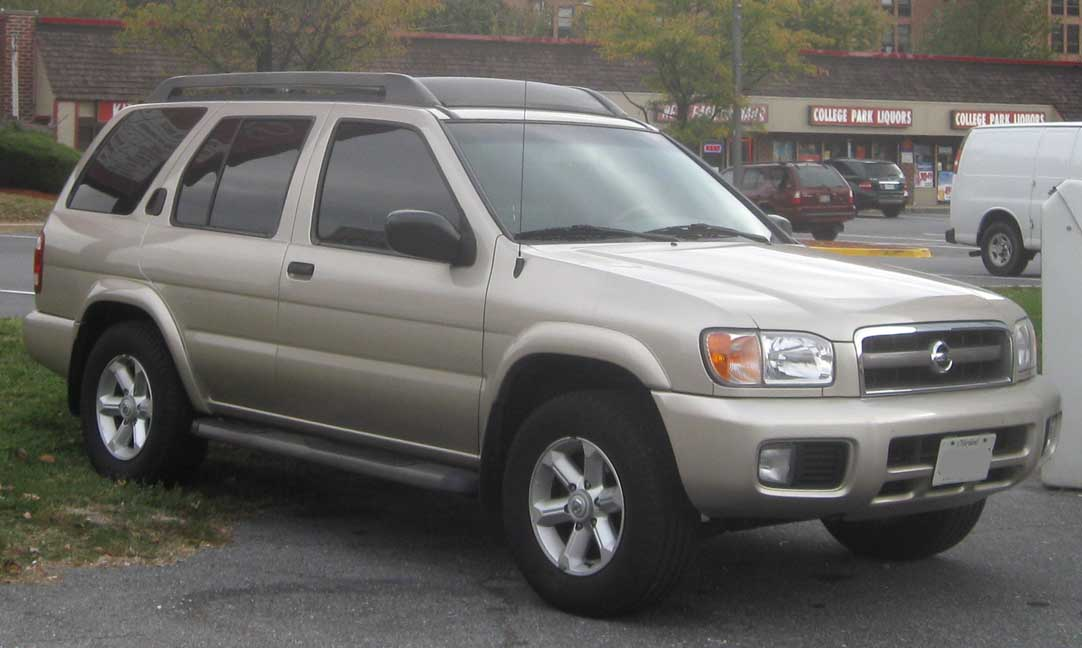
2001–2004 Nissan Pathfinder

=== Infiniti QX4/Terrano Regulus ===
Infiniti QX4
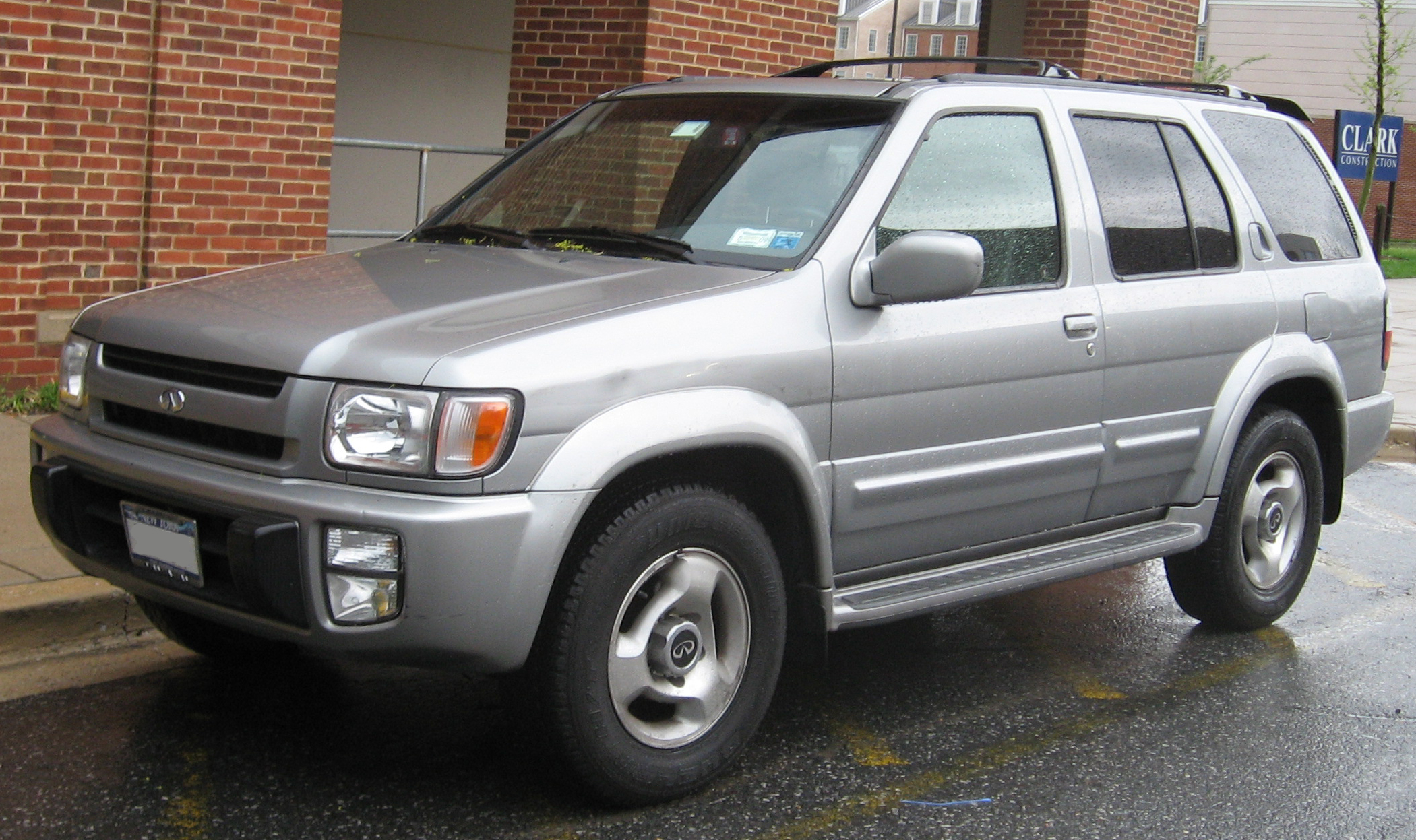
- 1997–2000 Infiniti QX4 (pre-facelift)

Overview
- Manufacturer: Nissan
- Also called: Nissan Terrano Regulus (Japan)
- Production: September 1996 – November 2002
- Model years: 1997–2003
- Assembly: Japan: Kanda, Fukuoka (Nissan Shatai)

Body and chassis
- Class: Mid-size luxury SUV
- Body style: 5-door SUV
- Layout: Front-engine, rear-wheel-drive; Front-engine, four-wheel-drive
- Chassis: Unibody

Powertrain
- Engine: Petrol: 3.3 L VG33E V6; 3.5 L VQ35DE DOHC 24V V6; Diesel: 3.0 L ZD30DDTi DOHC 16V turbo I4 (JDM); 3.2 L QD32ETi OHV turbo I4 (JDM)

Chronology
- Successor: Infiniti QX56; Infiniti FX

The Infiniti QX4 is a mid-size luxury SUV introduced in September 1996 and based on the Nissan Pathfinder. It was released following Acura's introduction of the SLX and Lexus's larger LX 450. The QX4 was Infiniti's first entry into the SUV market segment.

It was available in Japan as the Nissan Terrano Regulus and exclusive at Nissan's JDM Nissan Store. Major differences between these vehicles and the regular Pathfinder/Terrano include a more upscale interior and unique styling. Marketed as a luxury vehicle, The Terrano Regulus offered off-road capability with a low-range four-wheel-drive system and 8.3 inches (211 mm) of ground clearance. In Japan, two four-cylinder diesel engines were also available. The US-market engine was the same 3.3-litre V6 unit as used in the Pathfinder, producing 168 hp (125 kW) at 4,800 rpm and 196 lb⋅ft (266 N⋅m) at 4,800 rpm. This was generally considered underpowered for the segment, with a 0–60 mph (97 km/h) time of 12.4 seconds in period testing. In 1999, the Terrano was exclusive to reorganized Nissan JDM Nissan Blue Stage dealerships.

==== Year-to-year changes ====
The Terrano Regulus was updated in February 1999. The interior design was revised, while the old QD32ETi overhead valve turbodiesel was replaced with the new DOHC, 16-valve ZD30DDTi unit. The VG33E engine continued unchanged, but with the added option of two-wheel-drive.

The QX4 received its first major update in March 2000, as an early 2001 model. The biggest change was the new VQ series V6 engine (also later seen in the G35 and FX35), increasing its power from a relatively low 168 to 240 hp (125 to 179 kW). The displacement went from 3.3 L to 3.5 L. The timing belt was replaced with a timing chain and the ignition distributor was replaced with an individual coil ignition system. The revised version was introduced at the same price as the earlier model, in spite of the extra power and other improvements.

This facelift also gave the QX4 an updated exterior and interior body style, including a new grille and bumpers, reworked Xenon HID headlamps and redesigned taillights, a new dash with integrated analog clock, and 17-inch alloy wheels. Also, a rear-wheel drive QX4 model was added (1997 through 2000 were only available in 4WD).

The Terrano Regulus continued to use the VG33E engine (and the 3-litre turbodiesel inline-four), although the short-lived V6 2WD option was discontinued again in September 2001, along with some minor changes.

2002 Infiniti QX: Cruise control designed to maintain a set distance from other traffic was the main addition for 2002. The QX4 shared Nissan's Intelligent Cruise Control with Infiniti's flagship Q45 sedan. Employing laser sensors, the system was designed to automatically speed or slow the QX4 to keep it a constant distance from cars ahead. Also new for 2002 was a revised audio system, plus audio controls for the available leather/wood steering wheel. The optional rear-seat video entertainment system offered a choice of VCR or DVD player. The Japanese-market Terrano Regulus was discontinued in August 2002.

2003 Infiniti QX: Additional standard equipment for 2003 included curtain-type side airbags, available for the first time. New standard equipment that had previously been part of the Premium Package included 17-inch wheels, a driver-seat memory system, and a leather/woodgrain steering wheel with audio controls. Options included heated front/rear seats and a videotape or DVD rear-seat entertainment system. A power moonroof that came standard.

The QX4 was discontinued in 2003, and its position in price was taken by the FX35/45 crossover SUV. The last QX4 was manufactured during November 2002. The QX4 was succeeded by the larger QX56 in 2004.

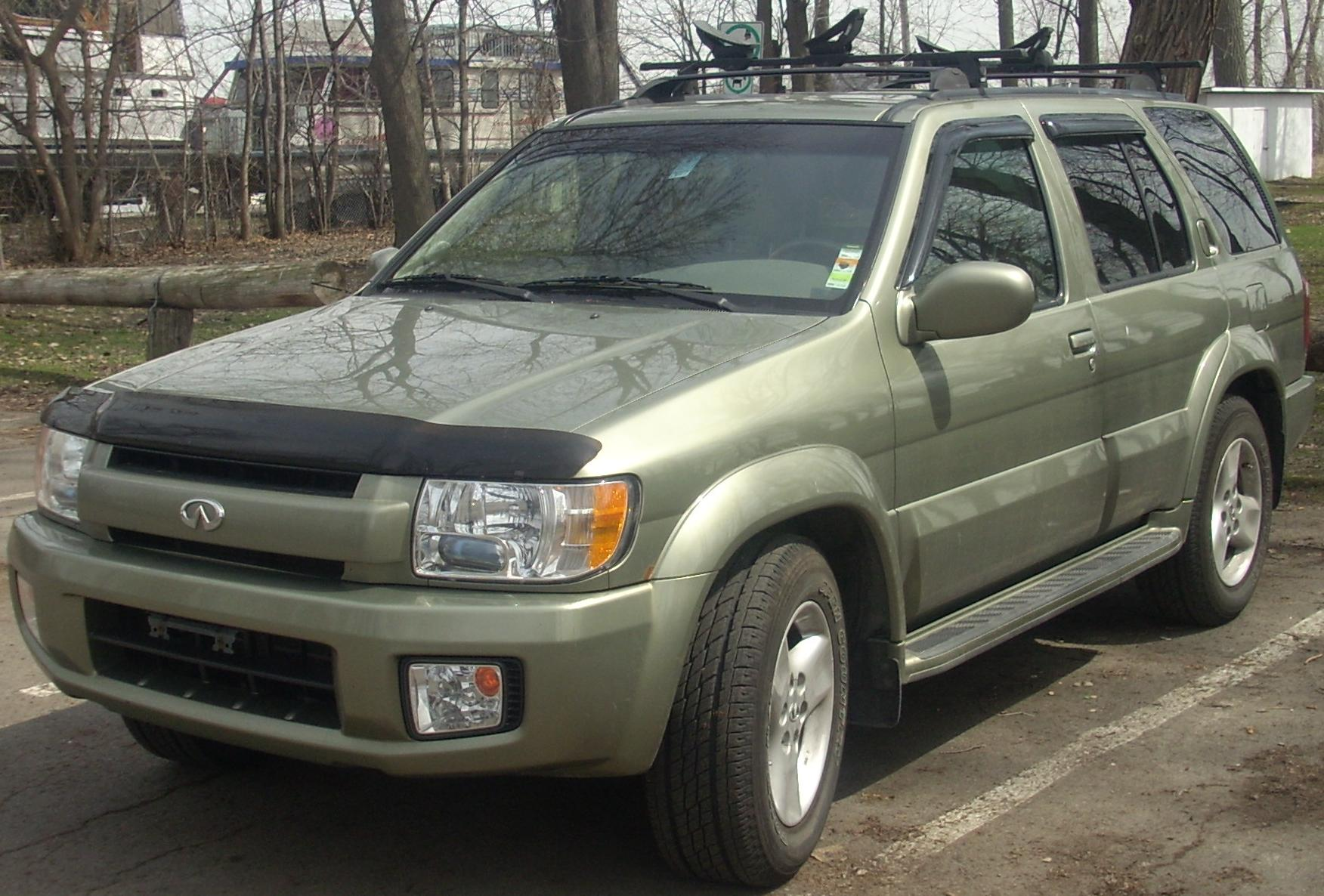
The facelifted QX4 (2001–2003)

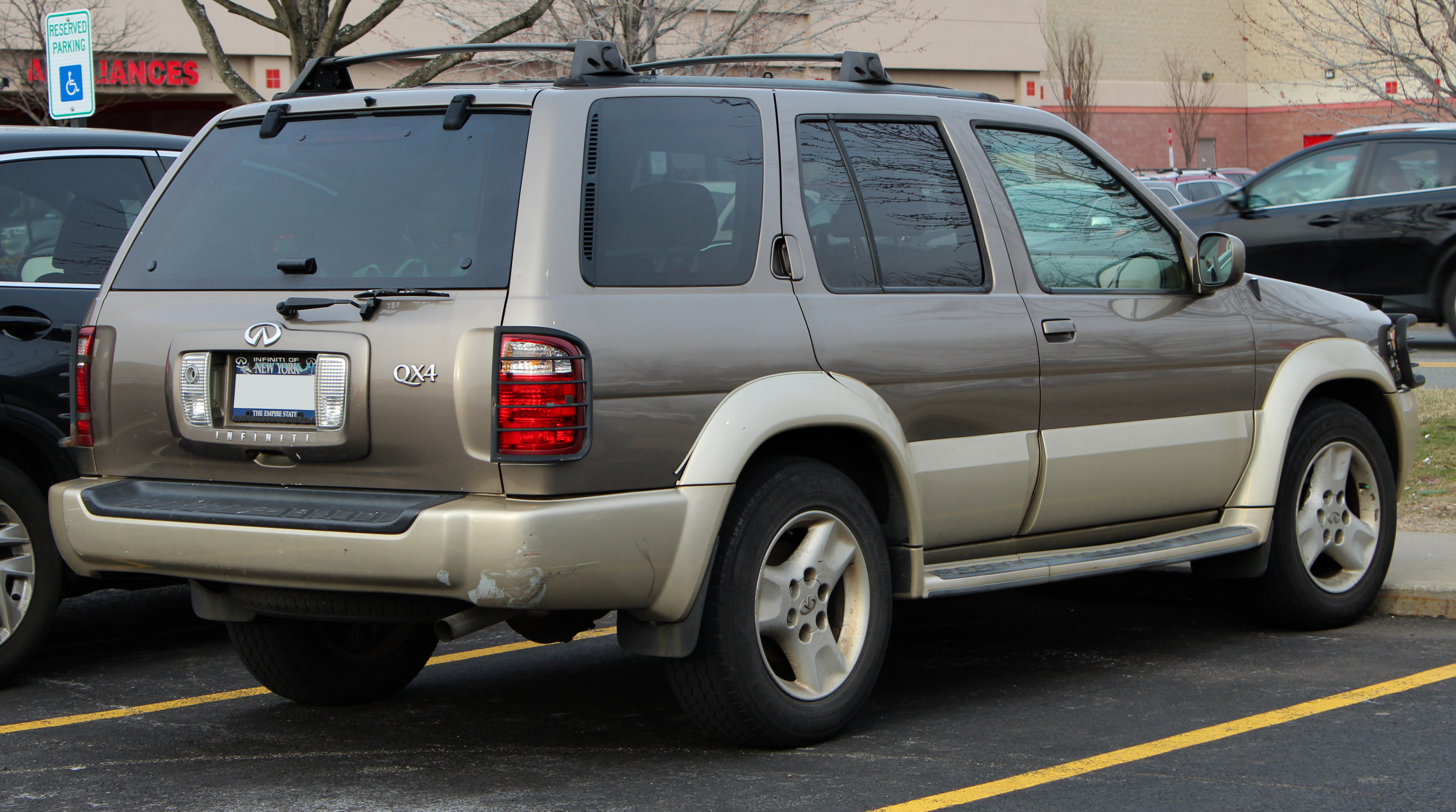
QX4 rear view (facelift model)

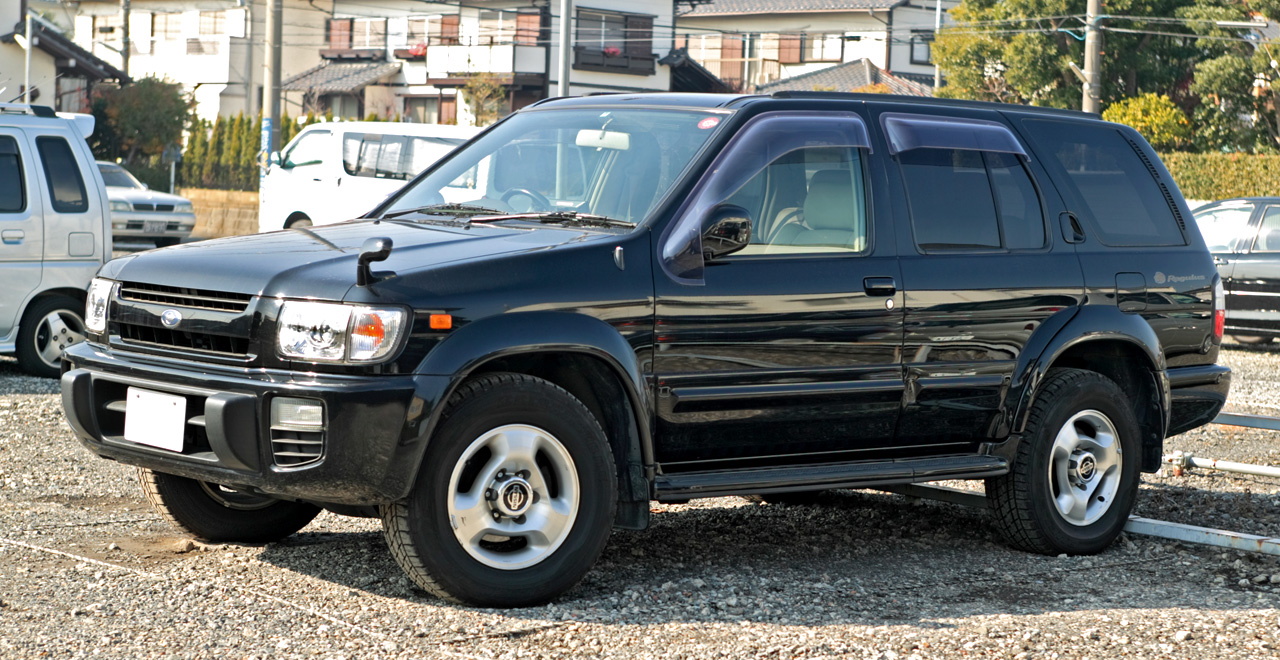
2001 Nissan Terrano Regulus (JDM)

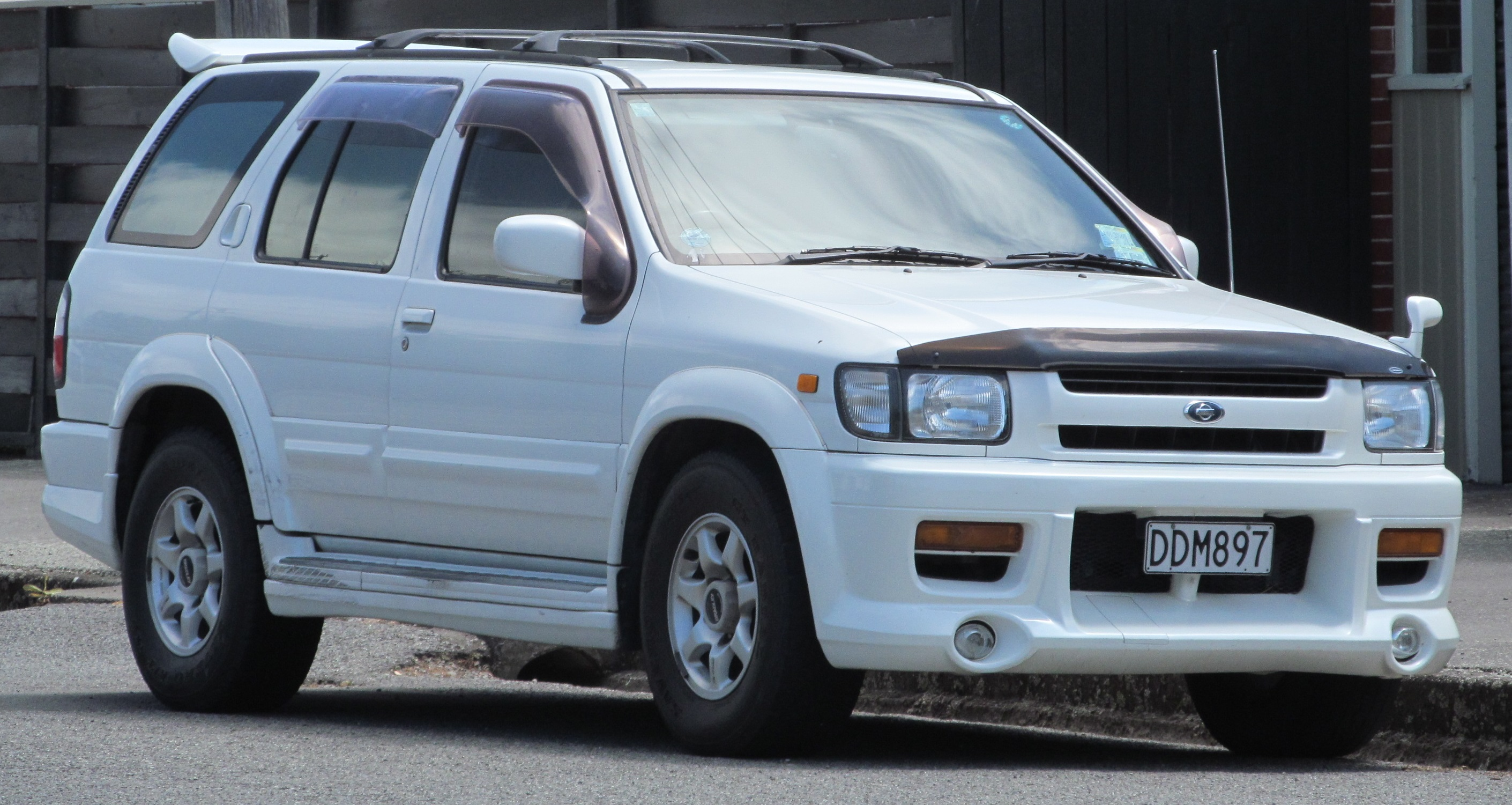
Nissan Terrano Regulus Starfire (JDM), fitted with a full Nismo bodykit

== Third generation (R51; 2004) ==
Third generation
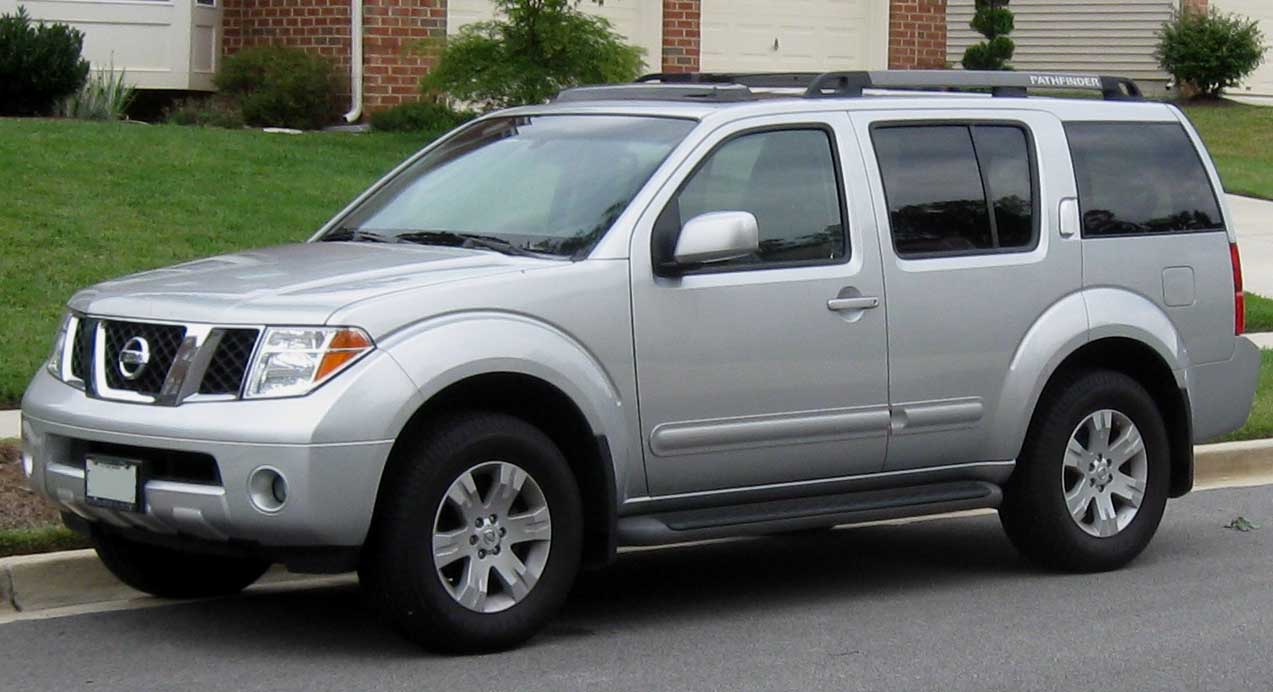
- 2005–2007 Nissan Pathfinder (pre-facelift)

Overview
- Model code: R51
- Production: August 2004 – 2014
- Model years: 2005–2012 (North America)
- Assembly: United States: Smyrna, Tennessee (2005–2012); Spain: Barcelona (2004–2014); Russia: Saint Petersburg (2012–2014)
- Designer: Kiyoshi Yanase (2002)

Body and chassis
- Class: Mid-size SUV
- Body style: 5-door SUV
- Layout: Front-engine, rear-wheel-drive; Front-engine, four-wheel-drive
- Platform: Nissan F-Alpha platform
- Chassis: Body-on-frame
- Related: Nissan Navara/Frontier (D40); Nissan Xterra (N50)

Powertrain
- Engine: Petrol: 4.0 L VQ40DE V6; 5.6 L VK56DE V8; Diesel: 2.5 L YD25DDT/DDTi turbo I4; 3.0 L V9X turbo V6
- Transmission: 5-speed RE5R05A automatic; 7-speed RE7R01B automatic (V9X only); 6-speed FS6R31A manual

Dimensions
- Wheelbase: 2,850 mm (112.2 in)
- Length: 4,765–4,890 mm (187.6–192.5 in)
- Width: 1,849 mm (72.8 in)
- Height: 1,839–1,862 mm (72.4–73.3 in)

Chronology
- Successor: Nissan Terra (as a body-on-frame SUV)

In August 2003, Nissan unveiled Dunehawk Concept and showcased it at the IAA 2003 in Frankfurt (R51 design patents filed 8 September 2003), previewing the next Pathfinder's design. At the 2004 North American International Auto Show, Nissan unveiled a completely redesigned Pathfinder for the 2005 model year. The new R51 Pathfinder uses the Nissan F-Alpha platform. It is powered by a 4.0 L V6 engine VQ40DE (266 hp (198 kW), 288 lb⋅ft (390 N⋅m)) or a 2.5 L YD25DDT (126 kW (171 PS; 169 hp), 403 N⋅m (297 lb⋅ft)) turbodiesel. The rear suspension uses an independent double wishbone setup instead of utilizing the five-link coil-sprung setup with live/solid axle from previous generations.

The larger Pathfinder Armada debuted in late 2003, but was based on the Titan full-sized pickup truck and dropped the "Pathfinder" prefix in 2005.

The 2005 model introduced a third row of seats to the Pathfinder line for the first time.

=== 2008 facelift (US and Middle East) ===
The facelifted 2008 Pathfinder debuted at the 2007 Chicago Auto Show. Some of the badge positions on the rear liftgate were tweaked, and this version also received the Titan's 5.6-litre V8 engine rated at 310 hp (231 kW) and 388 lb⋅ft (526 N⋅m).

=== 2010 facelift (Europe, South America, Asia/Oceania, Caribbean) ===
An updated version debuted at the Geneva Motor Show in 2010, was available with the Nissan V9X Engine 3.0-litre V6 turbodiesel producing 170 kW (231 PS; 228 hp) and 550 N⋅m (406 lb⋅ft) at 1,750 – 2,500 rpm while the upgraded YD25DDTi turbodiesel also available produces 140 kW (190 PS; 188 hp) – up 14 kW (19 PS; 19 hp) – while torque increased by 47 N⋅m (35 lb⋅ft) to 450 N⋅m (332 lb⋅ft). Over the combined cycle manual versions use 8.4 L/100 km – an improvement of 1.4 L/100 km – while CO_{2} emissions have fallen by 40g/km to 224 g/km. Both figures were class competitive at the time. A version of the engine with a diesel particulate filter (DPF) was also available in certain markets.

The R51 series Pathfinder continued to be sold and produced outside North America until 2014.

==== Exterior changes ====
The revised models have been given a new look front and rear to differentiate them from their predecessors. Changes at the front include a new bonnet, revised grille and a new bumper assembly. Adding 80 mm to the length of both models, the bumper is more rounded and lends a more sporting touch to the cars.

A new headlamp design with projectors is offered for Xenon lamps. Headlamps washers pop up from beneath body colour moulding in the bumpers. A new 18-inch (460 mm) alloy wheel is added to the existing range of 16-inch (steel and alloy) and 17-inch (alloy) designs. V8 models are given a V8 badge at the leading edge of both front doors and a new side moulding across the doors.

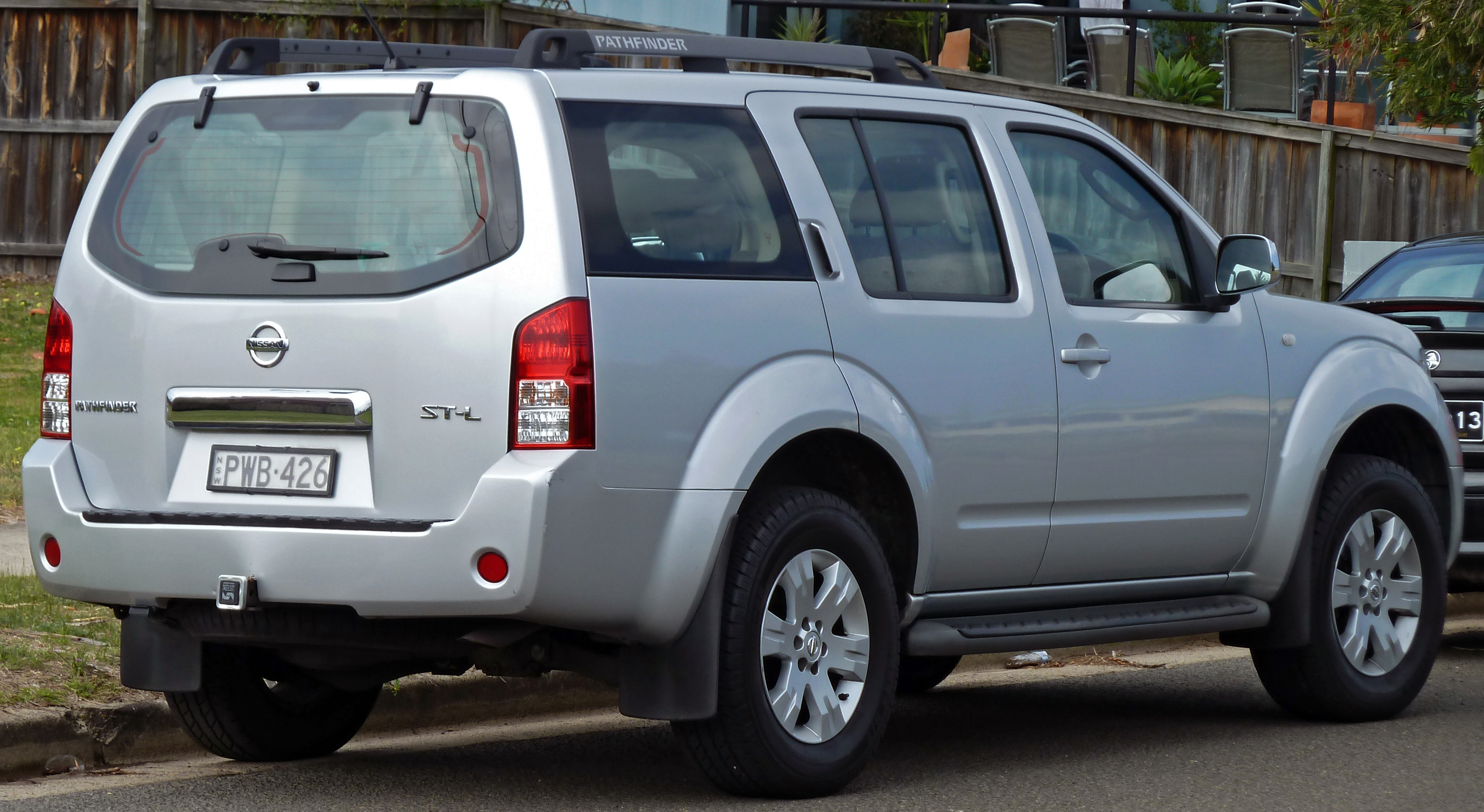
2005–2007 Nissan Pathfinder ST-L (pre-facelift, Australia)

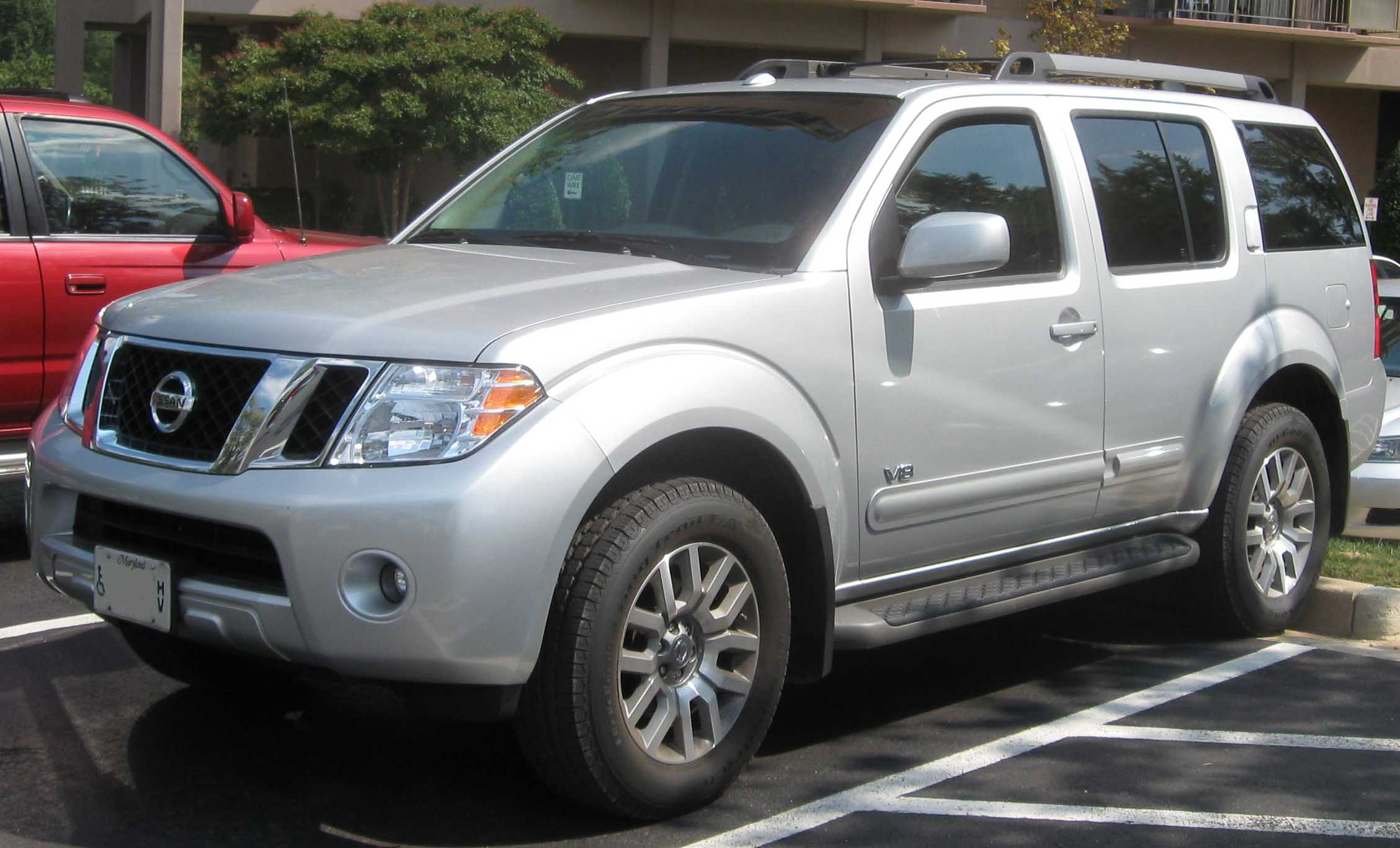
2008 Nissan Pathfinder V8 (facelift, US)

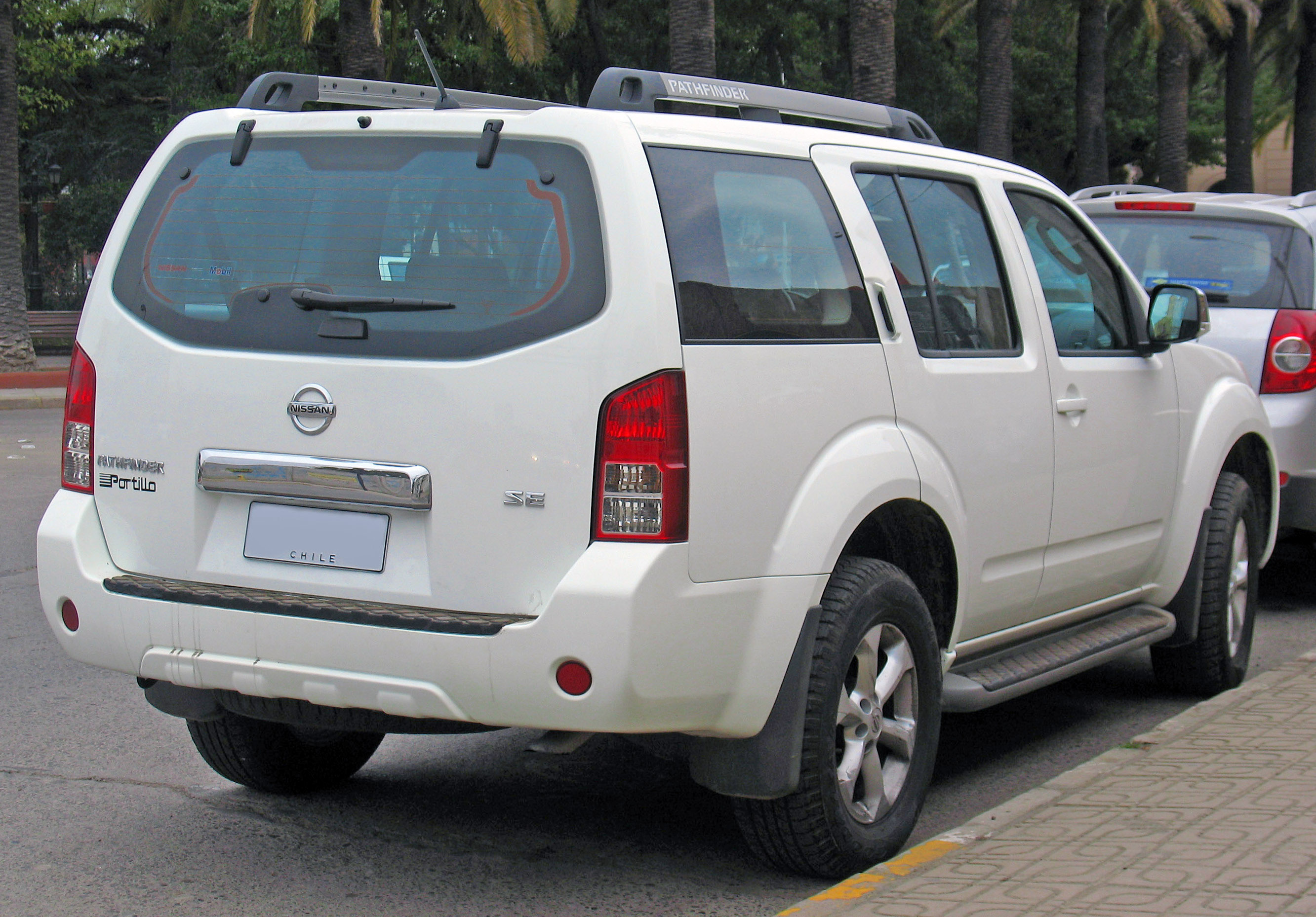
2013 Nissan Pathfinder SE (facelift)

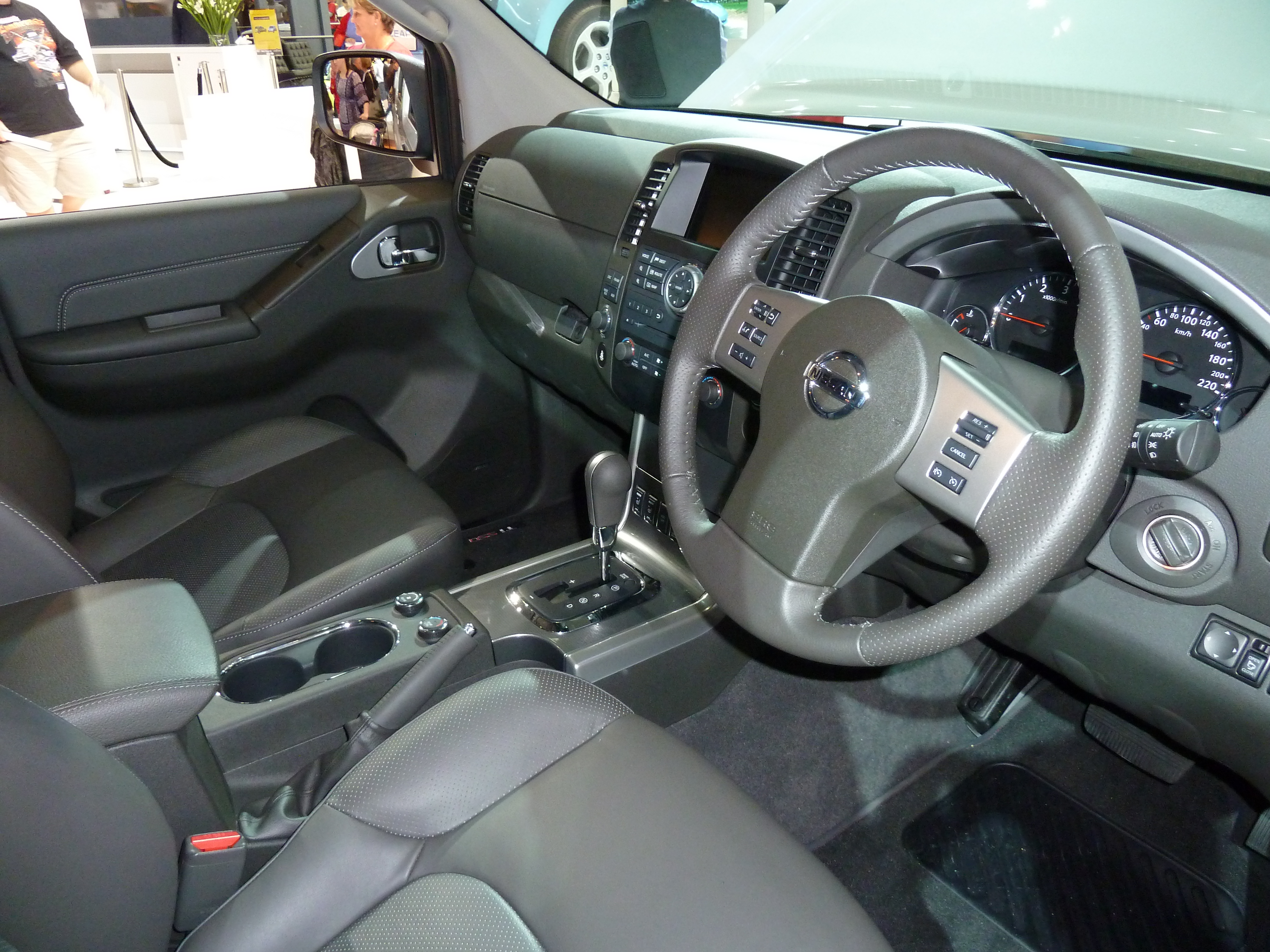
Interior

=== Safety ===
ANCAP test results* Nissan Pathfinder Ti variants (2005)
Test	Score
Overall	4 /5 stars
Frontal offset	14.17/16
Side impact	16/16
Pole	2/2
Seat belt reminders	2/3
Whiplash protection	Not Assessed
Pedestrian protection	Marginal
Electronic stability control	Optional

== Fourth generation (R52; 2012) ==
Fourth generation
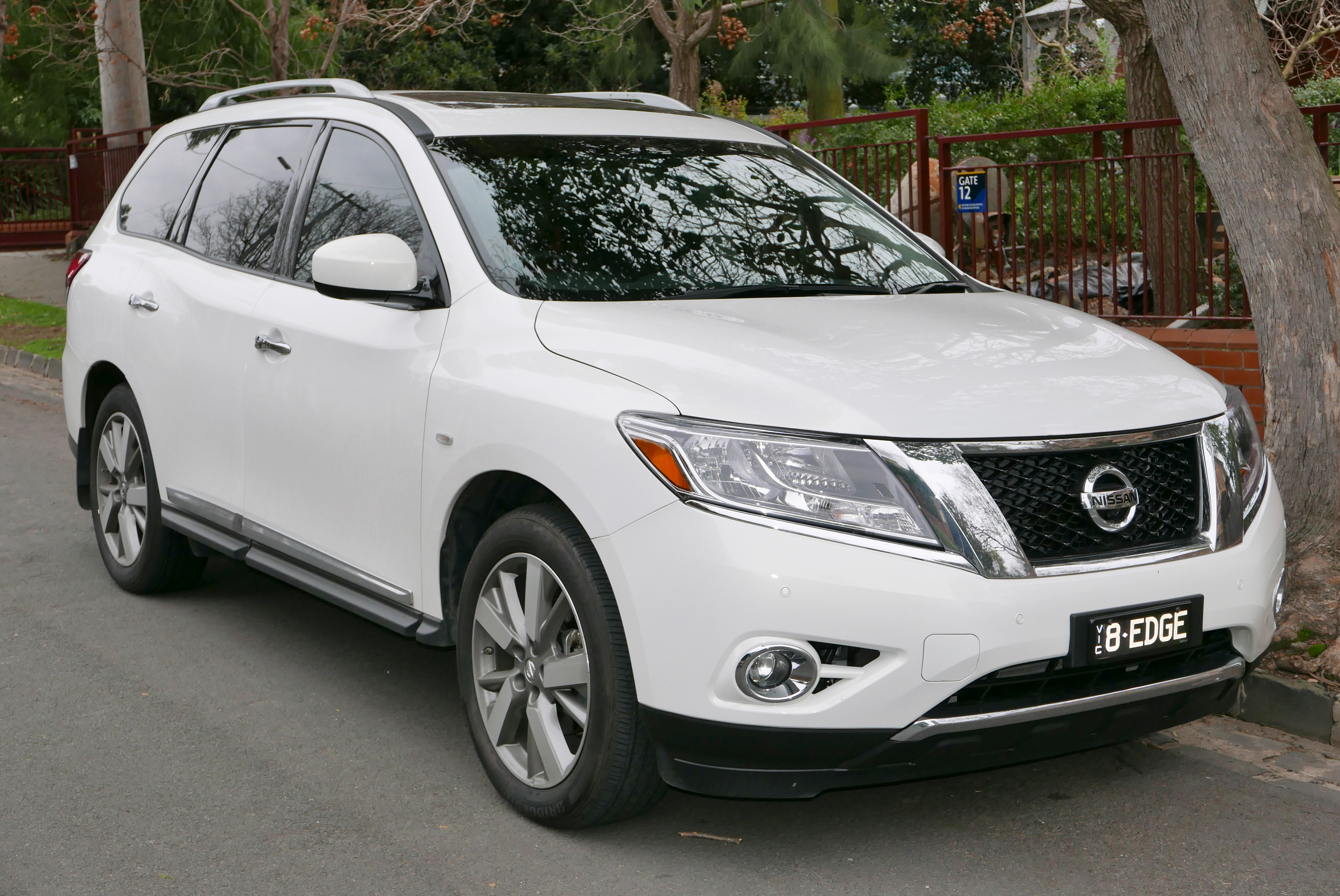
- Nissan Pathfinder Ti 4WD (Australia)

Overview
- Model code: R52
- Production: September 2012 – June 2020 (US)
- Model years: 2013–2020
- Assembly: United States: Smyrna, Tennessee (Nissan Smyrna Assembly Plant); Russia: Saint Petersburg (2014–2016)
- Designer: Alfonso Albaisa (2010)

Body and chassis
- Class: Mid-size crossover SUV
- Body style: 5-door SUV
- Layout: Front-engine, front-wheel-drive; Front-engine, four-wheel-drive
- Platform: Nissan D platform
- Chassis: Unibody
- Related: Infiniti JX/QX60 (L50)

Powertrain
- Engine: Petrol: 2.5 L QR25DER I4 mild hybrid (2013–2014); 3.5 L VQ35DE V6 (2013–2016); 3.5 L VQ35DD V6 (2017–2020); Diesel: 2.5 L YD25DDTi I4 turbo
- Transmission: Jatco Xtronic CVT

Dimensions
- Wheelbase: 2,900 mm (114.2 in)
- Length: 5,042 mm (198.5 in)
- Width: 1,963 mm (77.3 in)
- Height: 1,766 mm (69.5 in)

A redesigned Pathfinder went on sale in late October 2012 as a 2013 model. It moved away from a body-on-frame, truck-based SUV and adopted a unibody design. It rides on the same platform as the Infiniti QX60, Altima, Maxima, Murano and Quest. This generation Pathfinder has an interior similar to the second generation Murano, the Infiniti QX60, and some more SUVs and sedans. The third row has more leg room than the Nissan Rogue.

A concept, nearly identical to the eventual production model, was first revealed at the 2012 North American International Auto Show. Retail availability was scheduled for September 2012. The new Pathfinder is only available with a VQ35DE 3.5-litre V6 engine producing 260 hp (194 kW) and 240 lb⋅ft (325 N⋅m) of torque. City, highway and combined average fuel economy numbers are 20 (City), 26 (Highway) and 22 (Combined) mpg for the FWD version and 19 (City), 25 (Highway) and 21 (Combined) mpg for the 4WD version. The Pathfinder is significantly lighter than the previous generation, with the FWD model weighing 4149 pounds, while the 4WD Pathfinder weighs 4290 pounds.

This generation also abandons having the rear door handles hidden on the C pillar, a design feature of the first three generations of Pathfinders. As of 2015, the R52 series is only available in North America, Africa, Australia, New Zealand, South Korea, and the Middle East. It is not produced or sold in Japan.

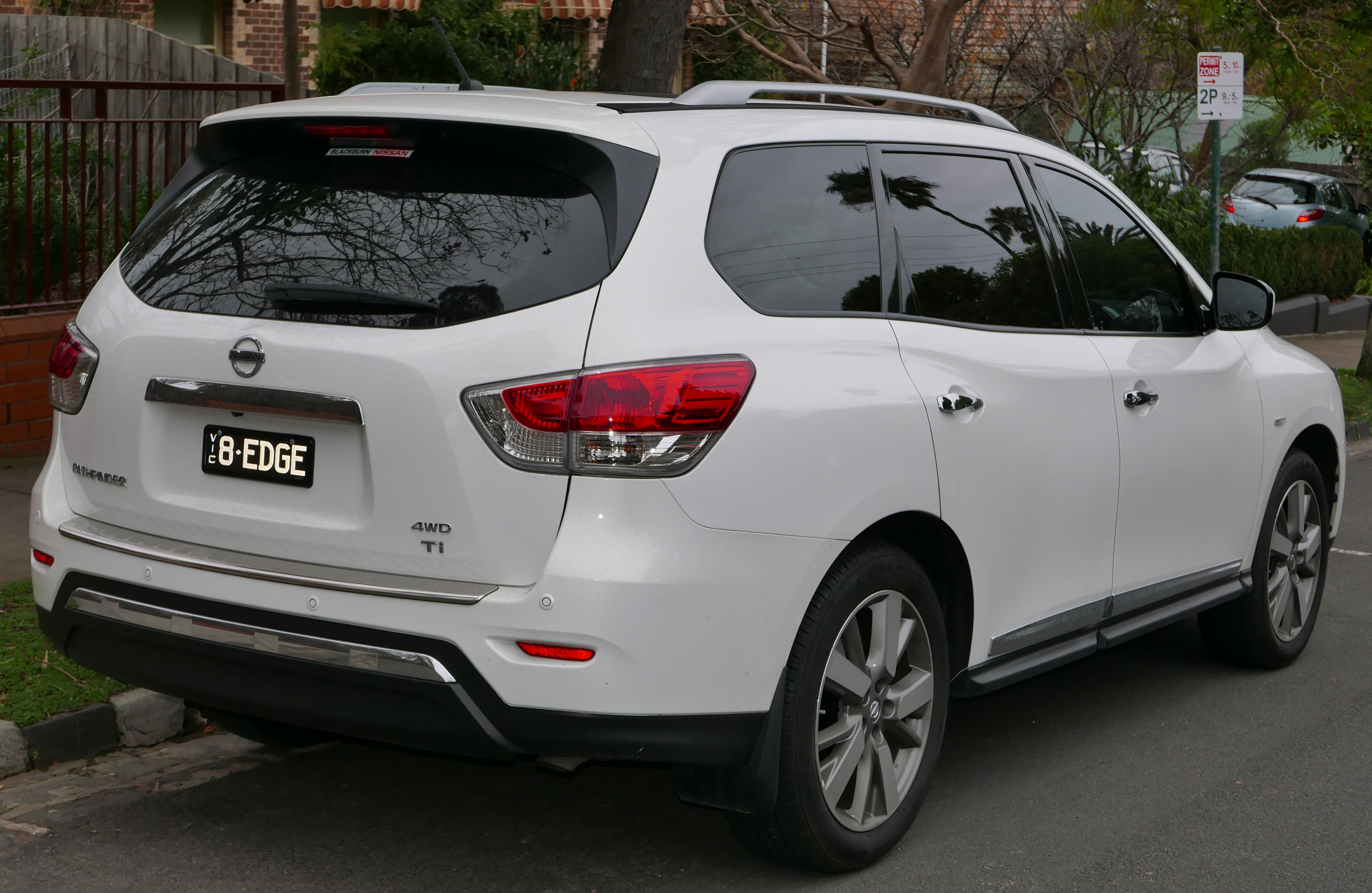
Rear view

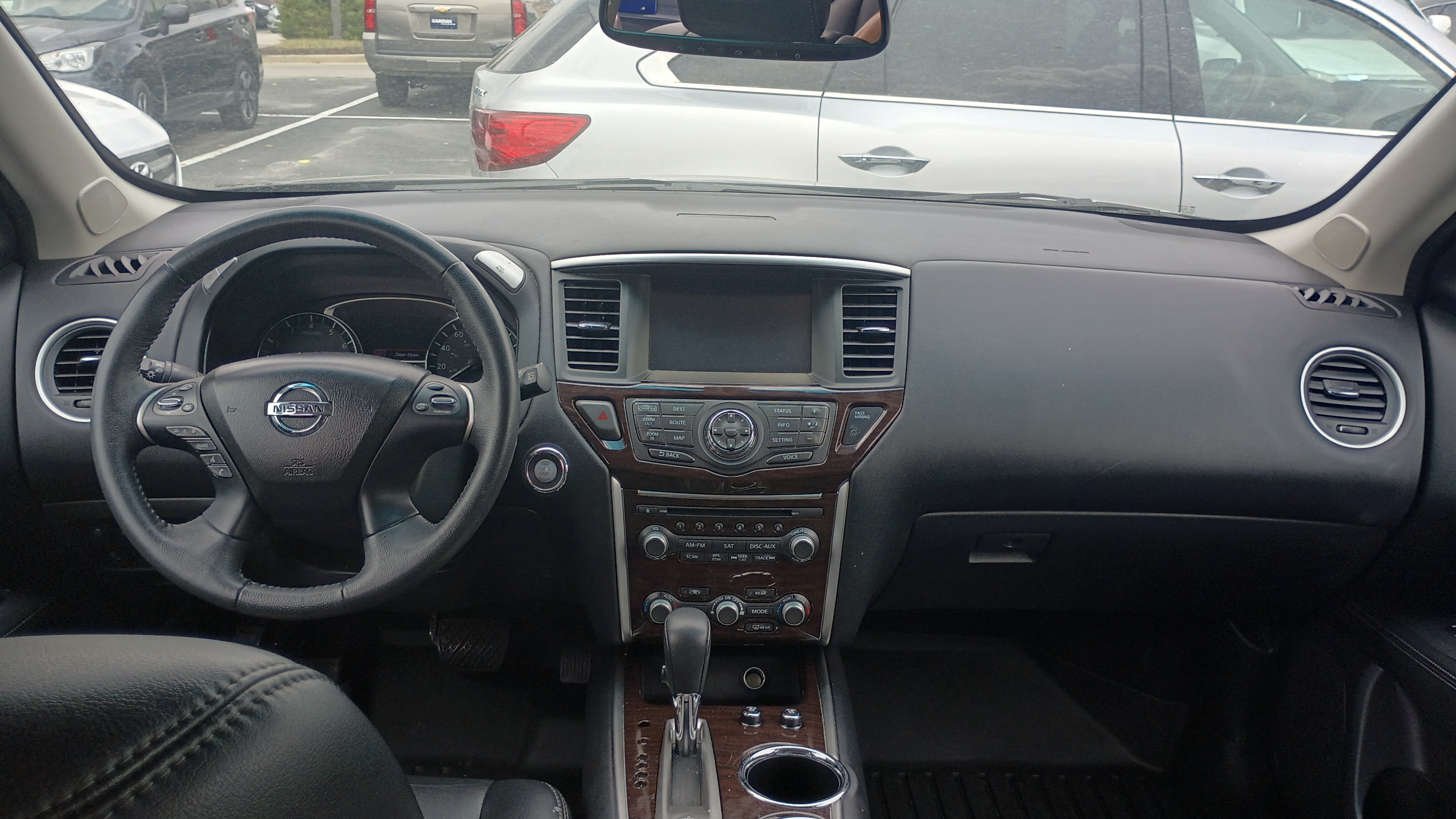
Interior

=== 2014 model year update ===
Changes to the US 2014 model include:

- New SL Tech Package, featuring Bose Premium Audio System, Nissan Navigation System, voice recognition, XM NavTraffic and NavWeather capability (SiriusXM subscription required, sold separately), Zagat Restaurant Survey, Bluetooth Streaming Audio and 8.0-inch colour touchscreen monitor
- Offered in four models: S, SV, SL and Platinum (each available in 4WD and 2WD); Pathfinder Hybrid offered in SV, SL and Platinum (4WD and 2WD)
- 3.5-litre V6 models available in the third quarter of 2013
- Pathfinder Hybrid available in late 2013
- Pathfinder utilizes a Continuously Variable Transmission (CVT) transmission made by Jatco; early versions of this CVT have proved to be problematic to the point of requiring replacement by Nissan in some 2013 and 2014 model years due to a hydraulic line size issue.

Canadian models of 2014 Pathfinder includes Pathfinder 3.5-litre 4WD V6 X, Pathfinder V6 S; 2014 Pathfinder Hybrid includes SV and Platinum Premium.

A locally built Pathfinder entered the Russian market in November 2014.

=== Pathfinder Hybrid ===
Introduced for the 2014 model year, the Pathfinder Hybrid, available in two-wheel drive and four-wheel drive configurations, uses a supercharged 2.5-litre four-cylinder petrol engine and an electric motor paired to a compact lithium-ion battery. The Li-ion battery fits under the third row seat, with no effect on space used for cargo or passengers. The Pathfinder Hybrid also has hybrid emblems and hybrid LED taillights versus the non-hybrid model.

Nissan discontinued the Pathfinder Hybrid after the 2014 model year due to owner reviews and complaints that they could not get fuel mileage that was anywhere close to the advertised 25 to 28 mpg and limited availability and poor sales in the United States (discontinued after the 2015 model year in Canada and in other global markets except Australia and New Zealand).

=== 2017 facelift ===
For the 2017 model year, the Pathfinder received an exterior update which includes a new fascia with restyled headlights and tail lights and a new direct-injected V6 engine with CVT—outputting 284 hp (212 kW) and 259 lb⋅ft (351 N⋅m). The headlights had LED projector low beam headlamps and LED daytime running lights standard on Platinum trim levels, while S, SV and SL trim levels offer restyled halogen projector headlights with LED daytime running lights. Restyled tail lights will be standard on Platinum trim levels, and all 2017 Pathfinders will also have new exterior colours added. The interior also has redesigned cup holders. A Motion Activated Liftgate also became standard on SL and Platinum trim levels, only as part of the power liftgate. The 2017 model year also marks the 30th anniversary for the Pathfinder in North America, but Nissan confirmed that there won't be any 30th anniversary special edition model. The Pathfinder will have a Midnight Edition trim level which will be higher than the Platinum trim level for its base MSRP and arrive in early 2017 and the Nissan Altima, Sentra, Murano, Maxima and Rogue will also add the Midnight Edition trim level to their trim lineups in early 2017.

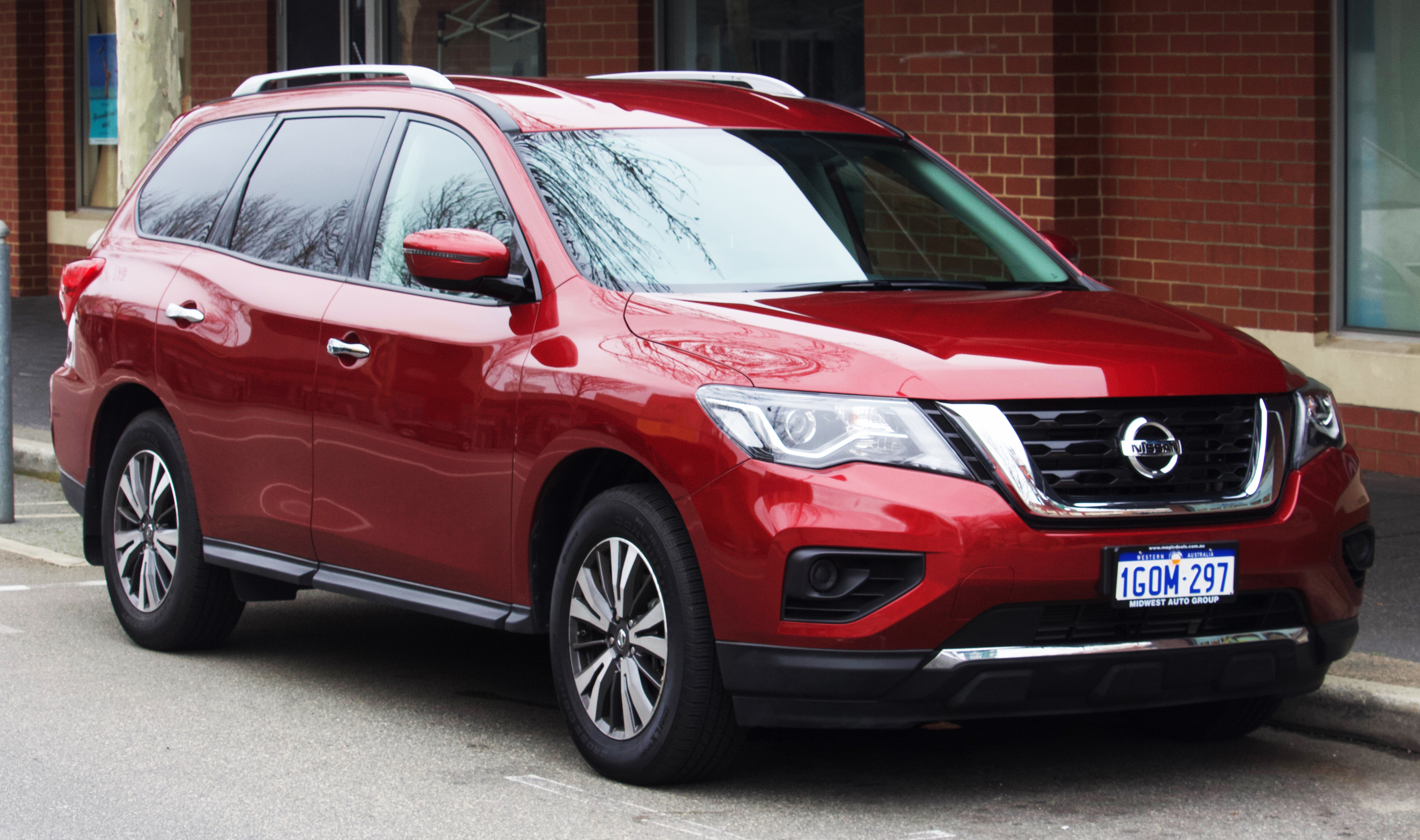
Nissan Pathfinder ST (2017 facelift; Australia)

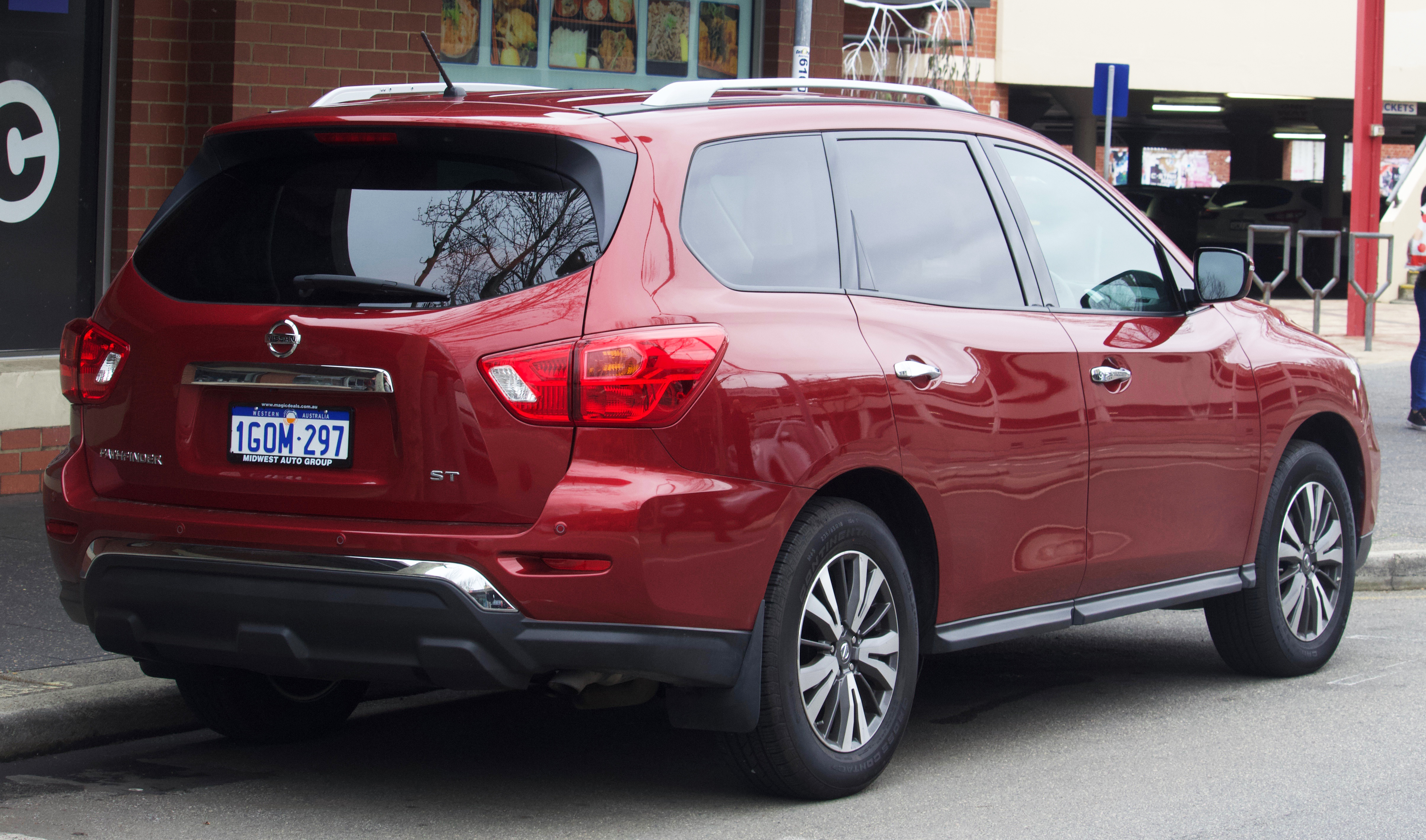
Rear view

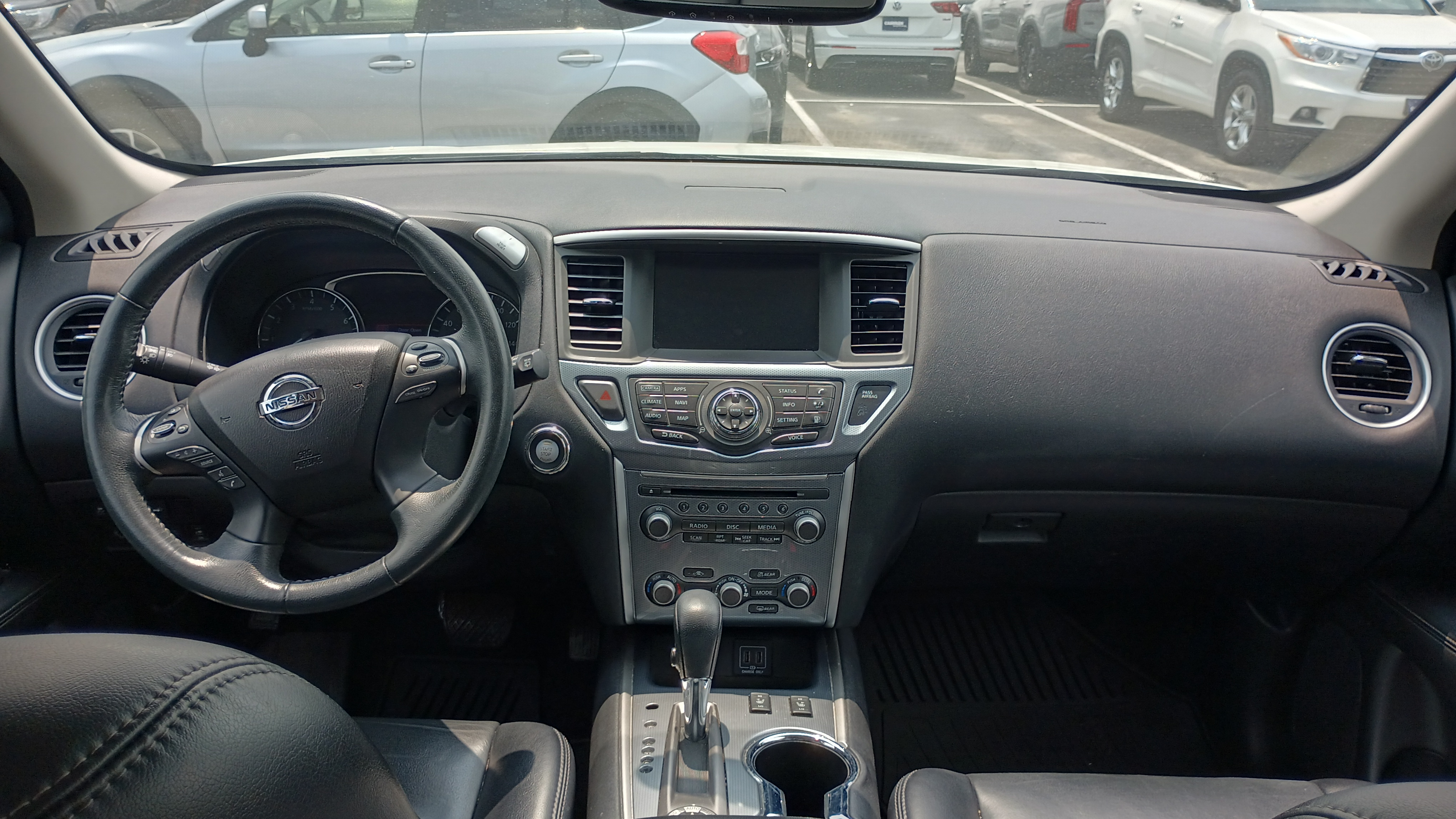
Interior

=== 2019 update ===
The Rock Creek Edition package is introduced to the Pathfinder for the 2019 model year. The appearance package is only available on the SV and SL trim levels. The package adds 18" X 7.5" dark-finished aluminum alloy wheels, black overfenders and black door handles, Rock Creek Edition badging, leatherette-appointed seating with cloth inserts and Rock Creek Edition badging (SV trim level), leather appointed seating with Rock Creek Edition badging (SL trim level), and premium Rock Creek Edition interior trim. It was manufactured until June 2020.

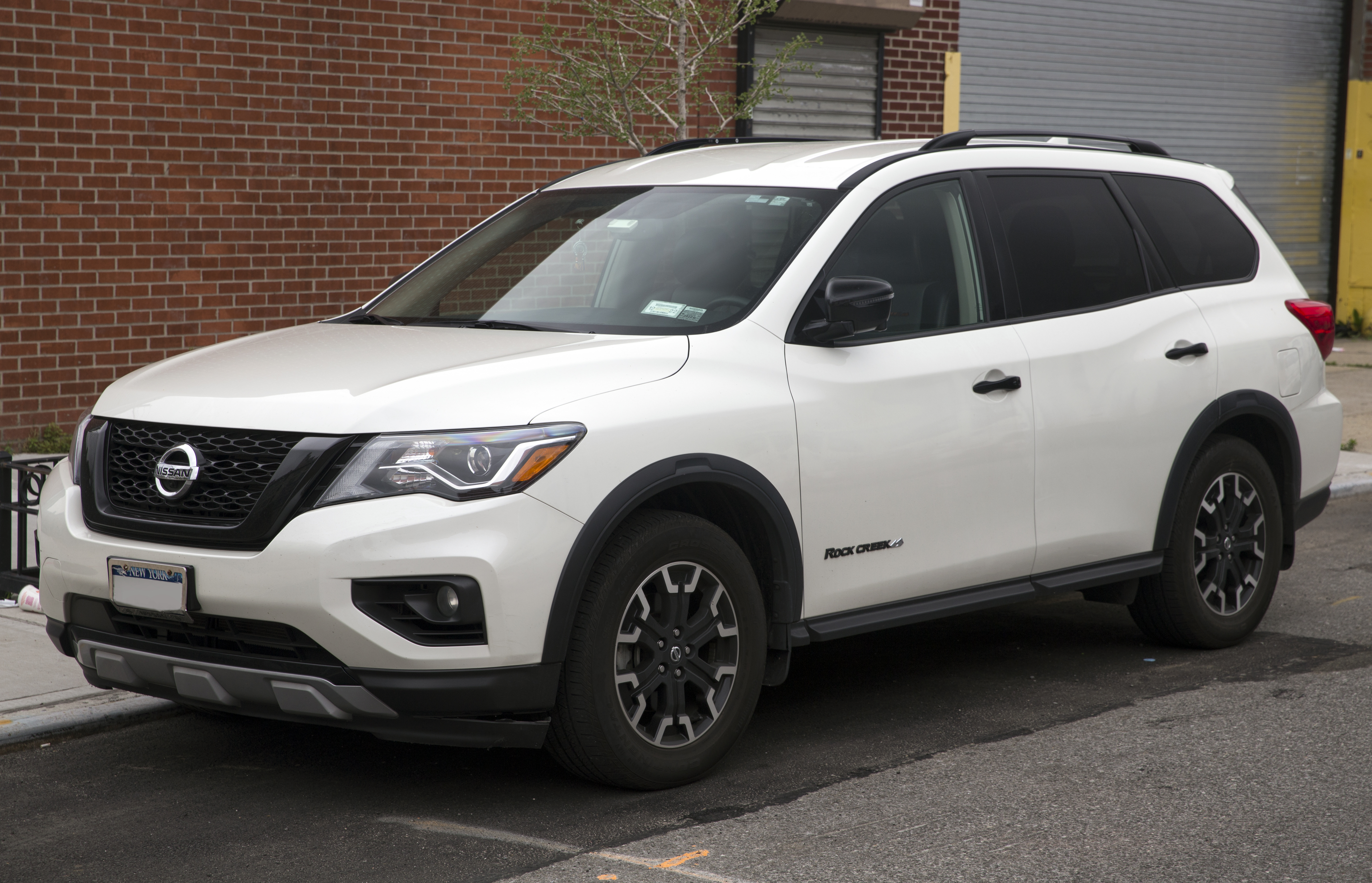
2019 Nissan Pathfinder SL Rock Creek (front view; US)

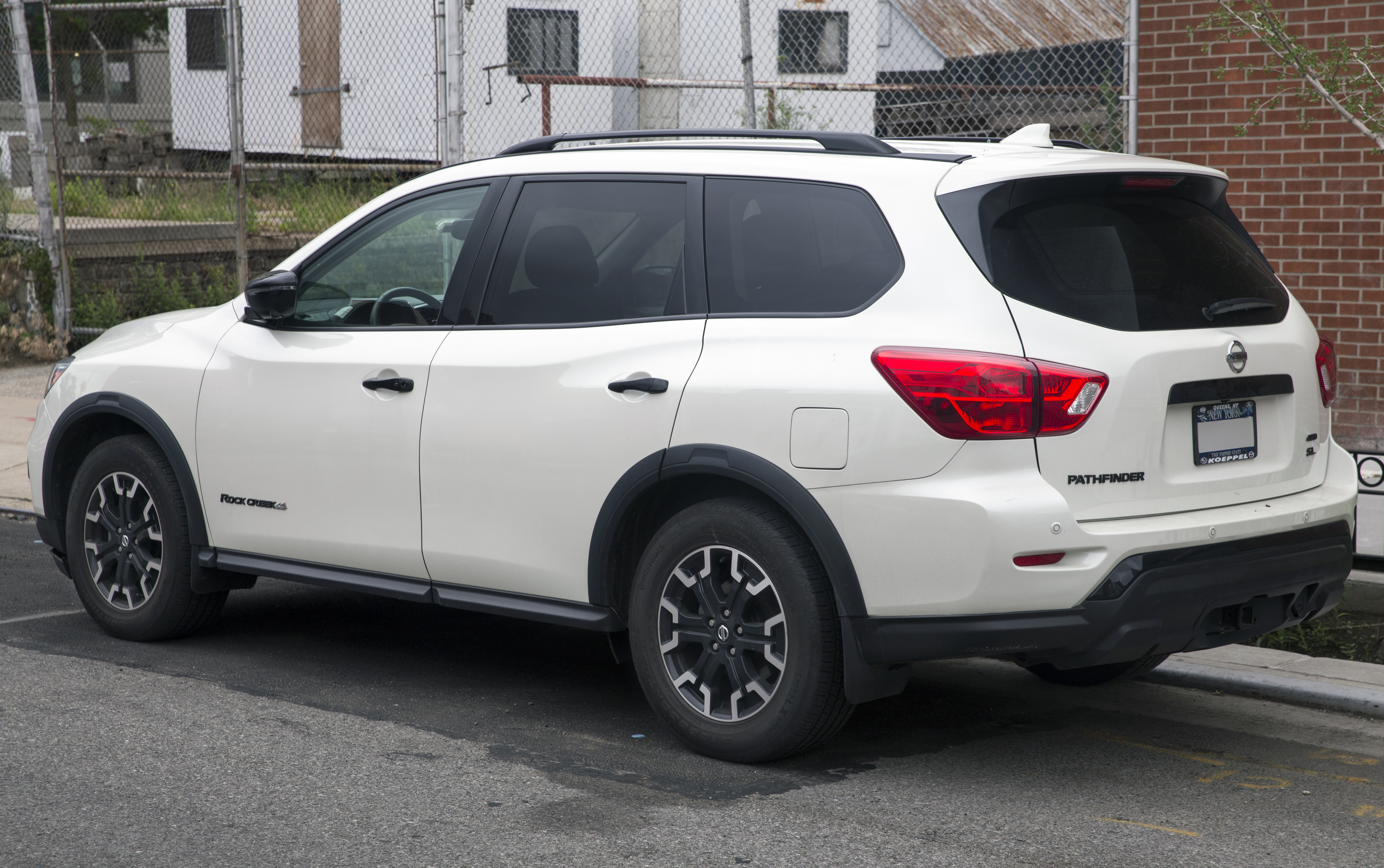
2019 Nissan Pathfinder SL Rock Creek (rear view; US)

=== Safety ===
ANCAP test results* Nissan Pathfinder (2013)
Test	Score
Overall	5 /5 stars
Frontal offset	14.73/16
Side impact	16/16
Pole	2/2
Seat belt reminders	3/3
Whiplash protection	Good
Pedestrian protection	Marginal
Electronic stability control	Standard

== Fifth generation (R53; 2021) ==
=== Global version (2021) ===
Fifth generation
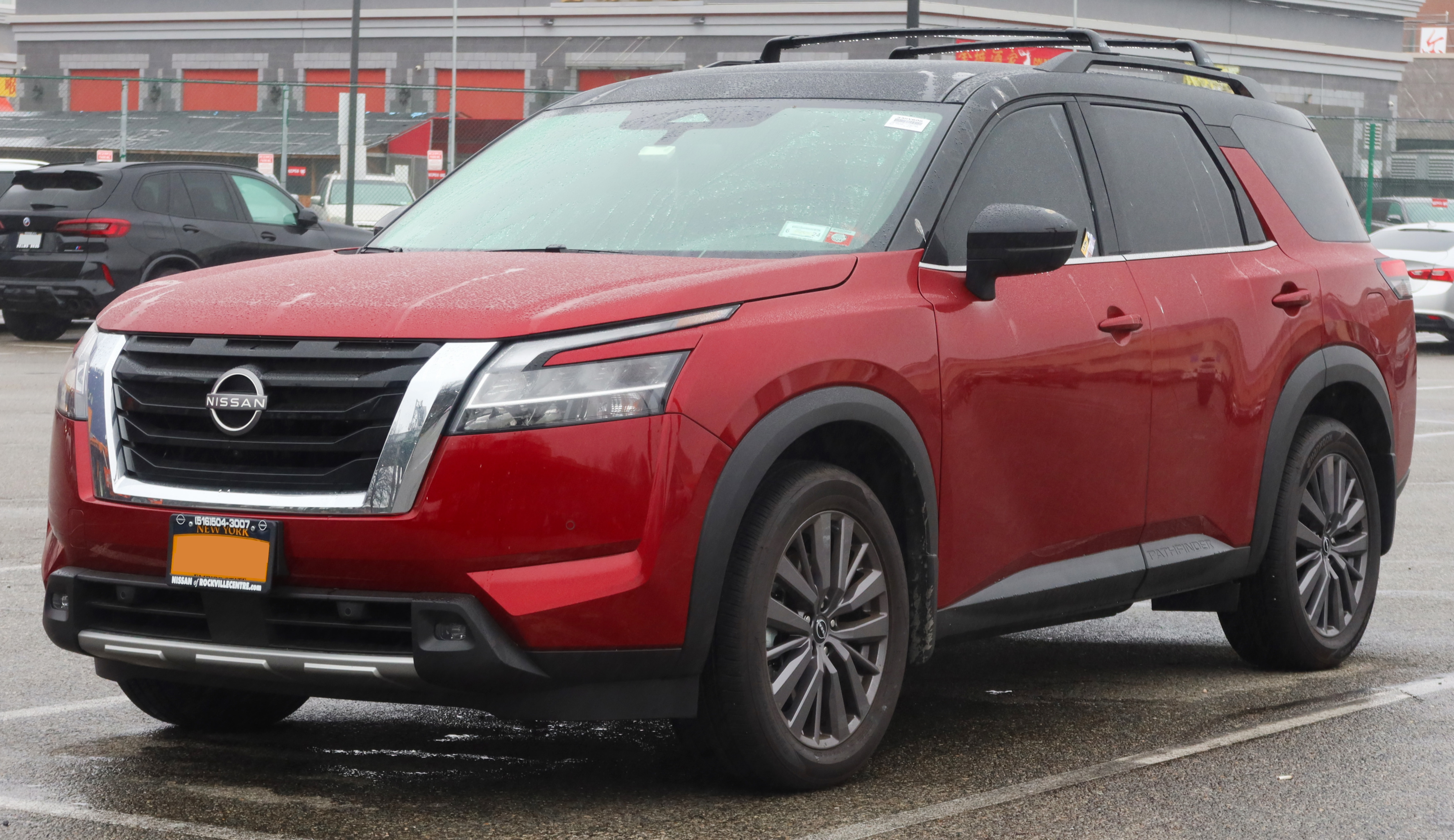
- 2023 Nissan Pathfinder SL (US; pre-facelift)

Overview
- Model code: R53
- Production: May 2021 – present
- Model years: 2022–present
- Assembly: United States: Smyrna, Tennessee (Nissan Smyrna Assembly Plant)
- Designer: Ken Lee (2017)

Body and chassis
- Class: Mid-size SUV
- Body style: 5-door SUV
- Layout: Front-engine, front-wheel-drive; Front-engine, all-wheel-drive
- Platform: Nissan D platform
- Chassis: Unibody
- Related: Infiniti QX60 (L51)

Powertrain
- Engine: Petrol: 3.5 L VQ35DD V6
- Transmission: 9-speed ZF 9HP automatic

Dimensions
- Wheelbase: 2,900 mm (114.2 in)
- Length: 5,021 mm (197.7 in)
- Width: 1,979 mm (77.9 in)
- Height: 1,801 mm (70.9 in)

The fifth-generation Pathfinder was unveiled on 4 February 2021. Nissan has preferred to be scheduled for a debut in the middle of 2020 as a 2021 model but later, it was scheduled debut as a 2022 model while the 2021 model year was entirely skipped since the fifth generation Pathfinder began the production in May 2021, then taking tests in July 2021 and began commercialization in August 2021. The model remains a unibody crossover, riding on the same platform as the previous generation, though it gains a more squared-off look with styling cues from previous Pathfinders along with the Rogue and Armada. Its dimensions are 1.5 in (3.8 cm) longer, 0.6 in (1.5 cm) wider, and 0.5 in (1.3 cm) taller. Engine power remains the same, at 284 hp (212 kW; 288 PS) and 259 lb⋅ft (351 N⋅m) of torque, though the CVT is replaced with an all-new 9-speed automatic from ZF. The fifth-generation Pathfinder also receives a new terrain-management system, dubbed Intelligent 4x4, featuring seven management settings. Trailer sway control is also included as standard, in addition to Safety Shield 360, Nissan's active safety suite.

The interior also receives a redesign, featuring a squared-off, trucklike appearance mirroring the overall theme set by the exterior. The new interior also gains the "floating bridge" and electronic shifter seen in the smaller Rogue. An 8-inch touchscreen infotainment with Apple CarPlay and Android Auto is standard, while upper trims use a 9-inch unit, with wireless Apple CarPlay capability. The top-spec Platinum model gains a 12.3-inch digital gauge cluster and a 10.8-inch heads-up display in addition to the 9-inch screen. The fifth-generation Pathfinder comes standard as an 8-seater, with second-row bucket seats, a first for the Pathfinder, are available. The S and SV trim levels get cloth seat trim as standard, with leather-appointed seating standard on the SL trim level; the Platinum trim level gets quilted, semi-aniline leather-appointed seating.

In 2022, for the 2023 model year, the new Rock Creek Edition is available with black wheels, and off-road suspension and a new Baja Storm exterior colour is also available and the wireless smartphone charging pad is standard on the SL grade while the Platinum trim level comes standard with second-row bucket seats.

In 2026, Nissan announced that the Pathfinder will be discontinued in Australia and New Zealand, due to unfavorable exchange rates, declining sales, and lack of hybrid powertrain options (especially with the Government of Australia mandating more tougher and stringent federal automotive emissions standards on all new passenger vehicles sold in Australia starting in 2026 under the New Vehicle Efficiency Standard Act of 2024, to fight climate change and force the Australian automotive industry to eventually transition to 100% all-electric vehicles in the future).

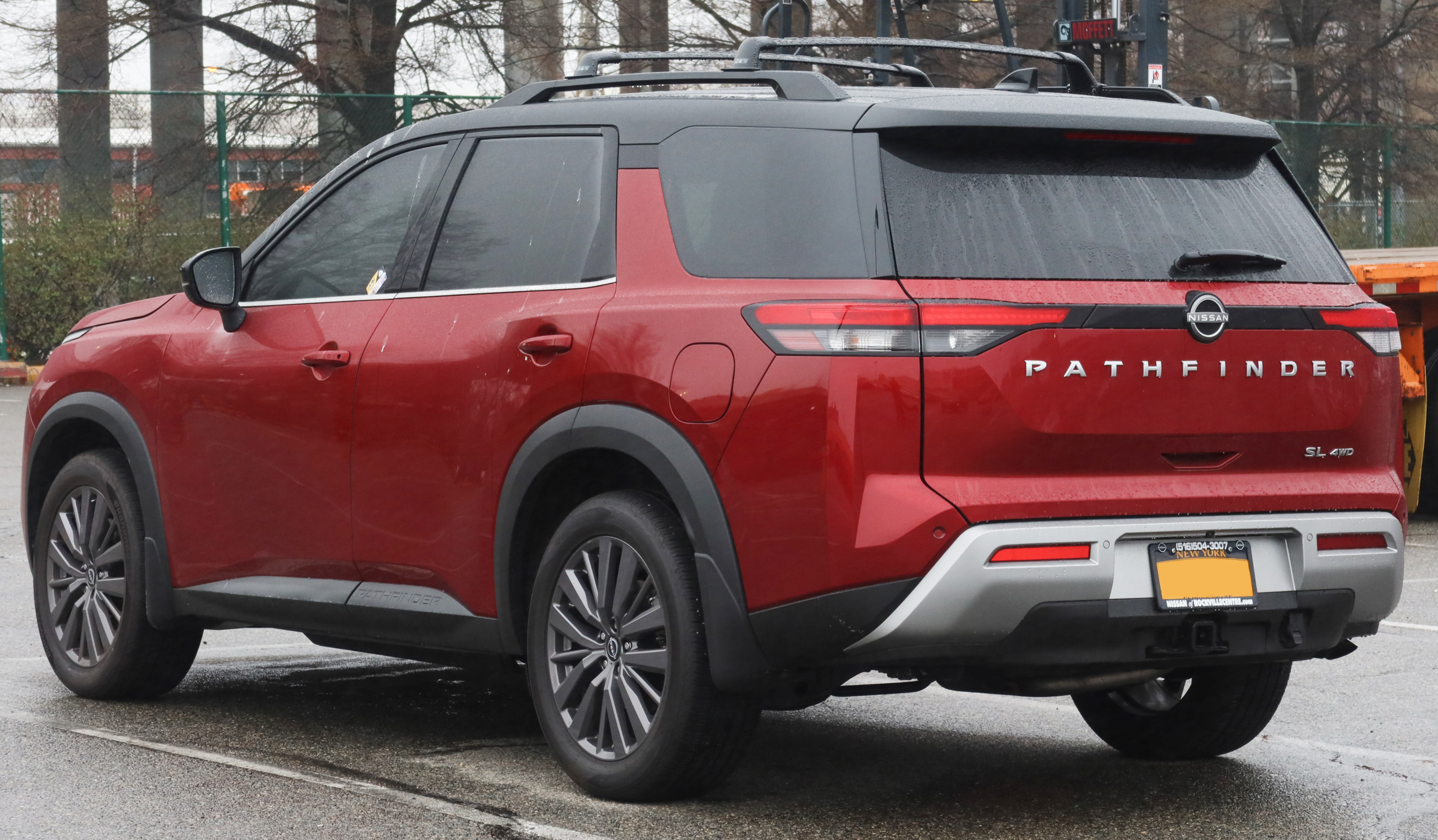
Rear view (pre-facelift)

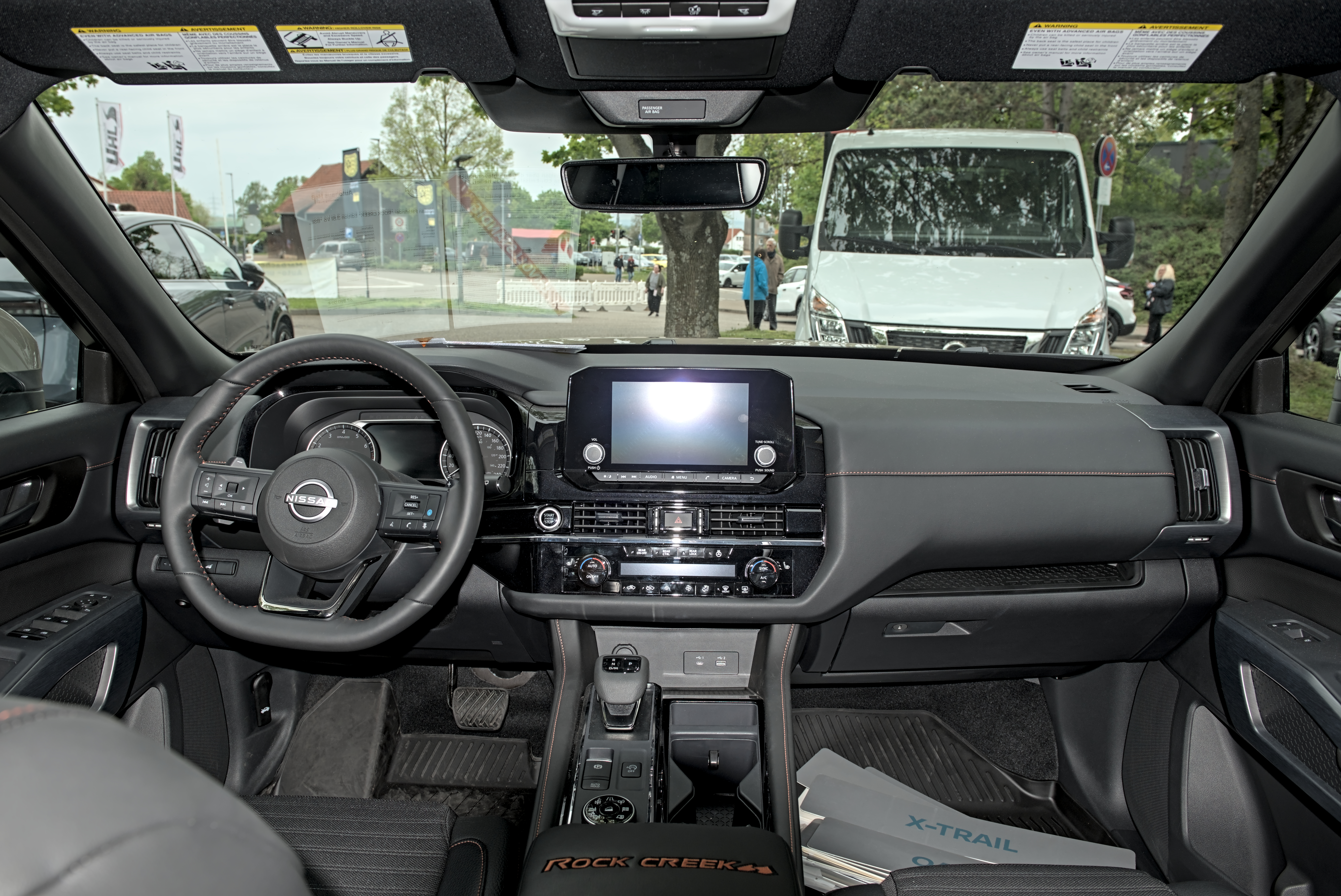
Interior

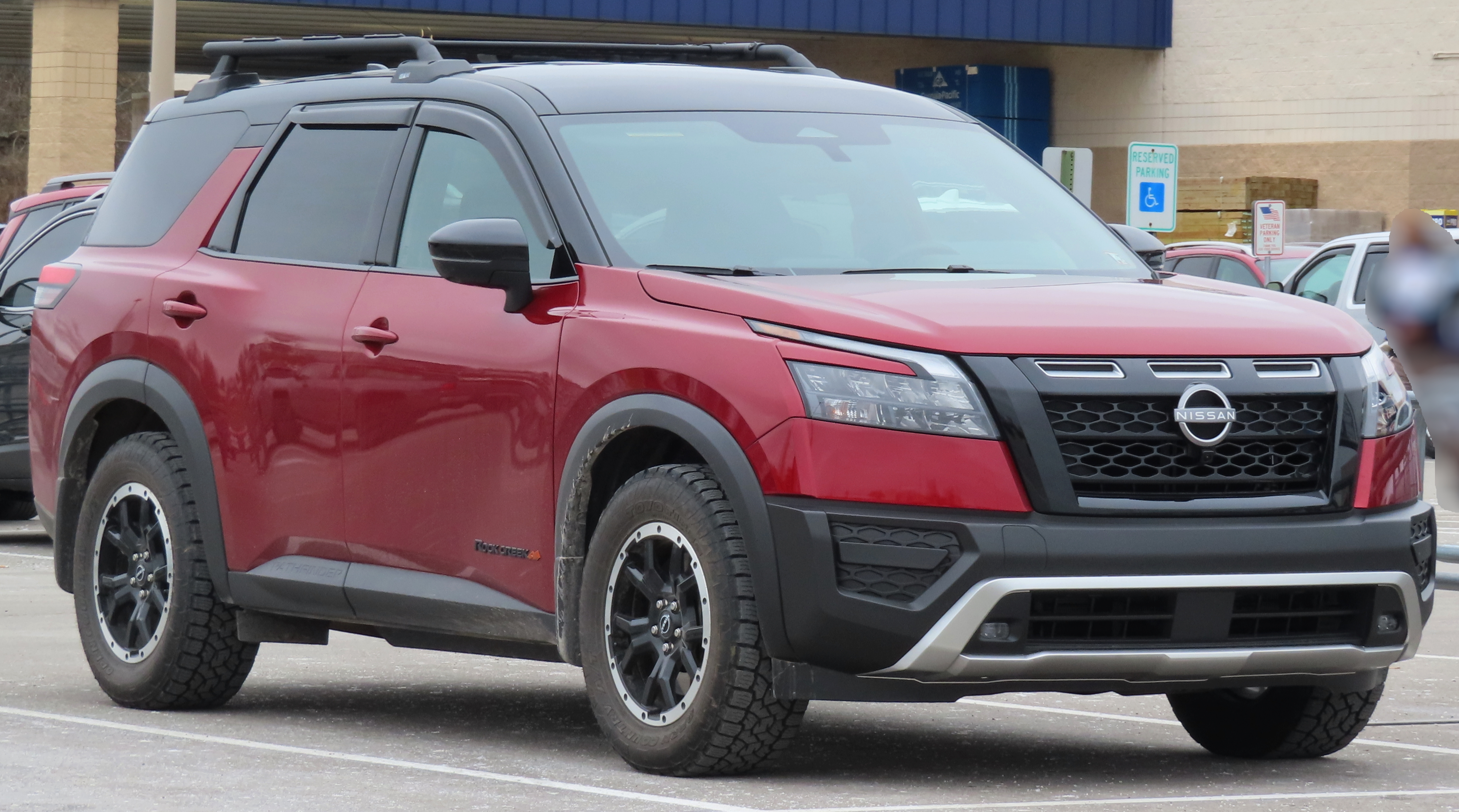
2024 Nissan Pathfinder Rock Creek (US; pre-facelift)

==== Facelift (2026) ====
The Pathfinder facelift was unveiled on November 13 2025. The facelift introduces revised front and rear fascias, a more prominent grille, satin badges, and black roof rails on SL and Platinum trims. A new Baltic Teal color joins the palette, and Platinum models feature 20-inch wheels. A restyled dashboard includes a standard 12.3-inch touchscreen across all trims, up from 8- or 9-inch units, with wireless Apple CarPlay and Android Auto. SL and higher trims add a 12.3-inch digital gauge cluster, embossed "PATHFINDER" lettering, and an upgraded wireless charger with 15-watt output and cooling fan. Platinum gains new seat quilting and wood-tone trim.

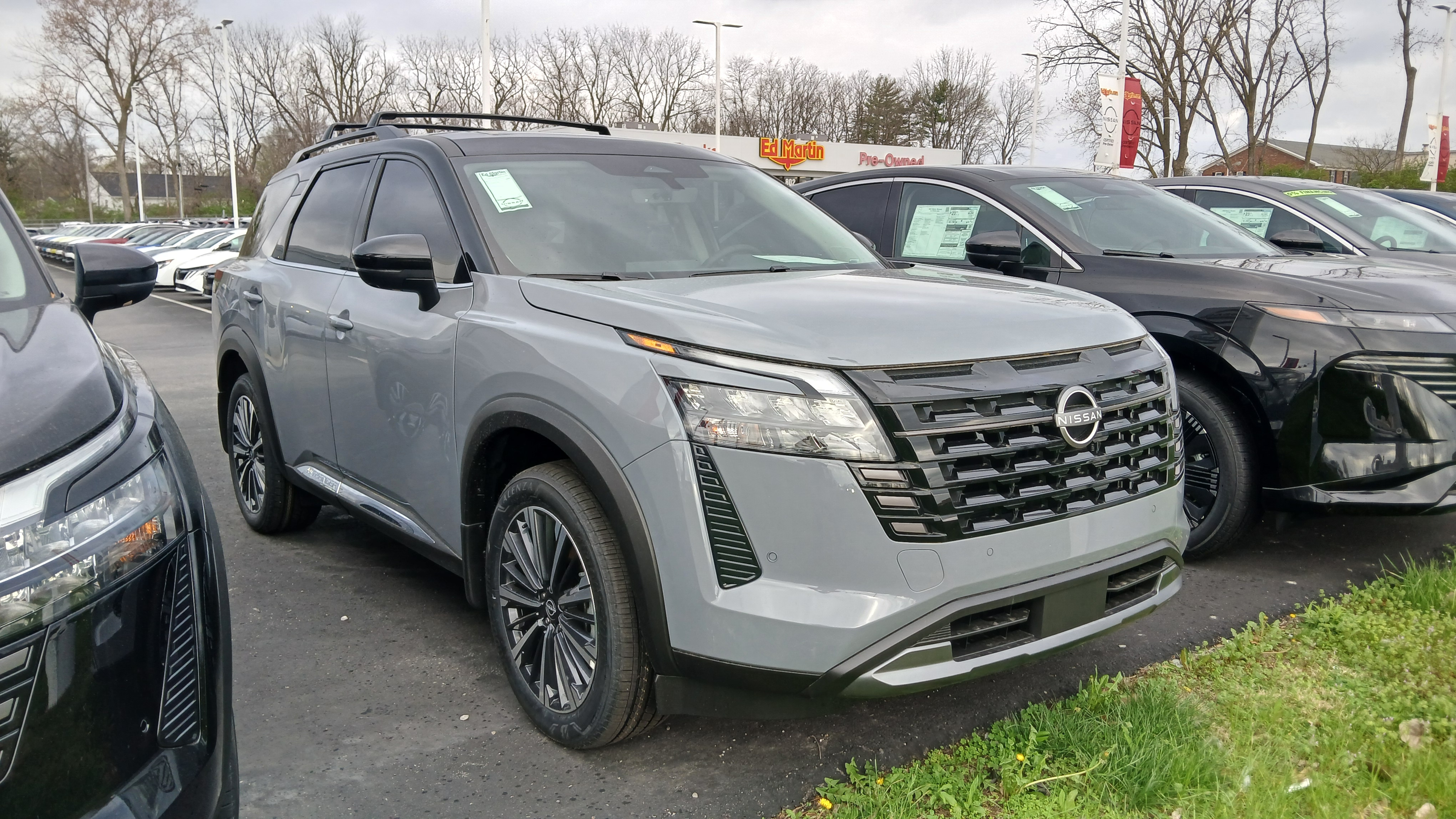
2026 Pathfinder (facelift)

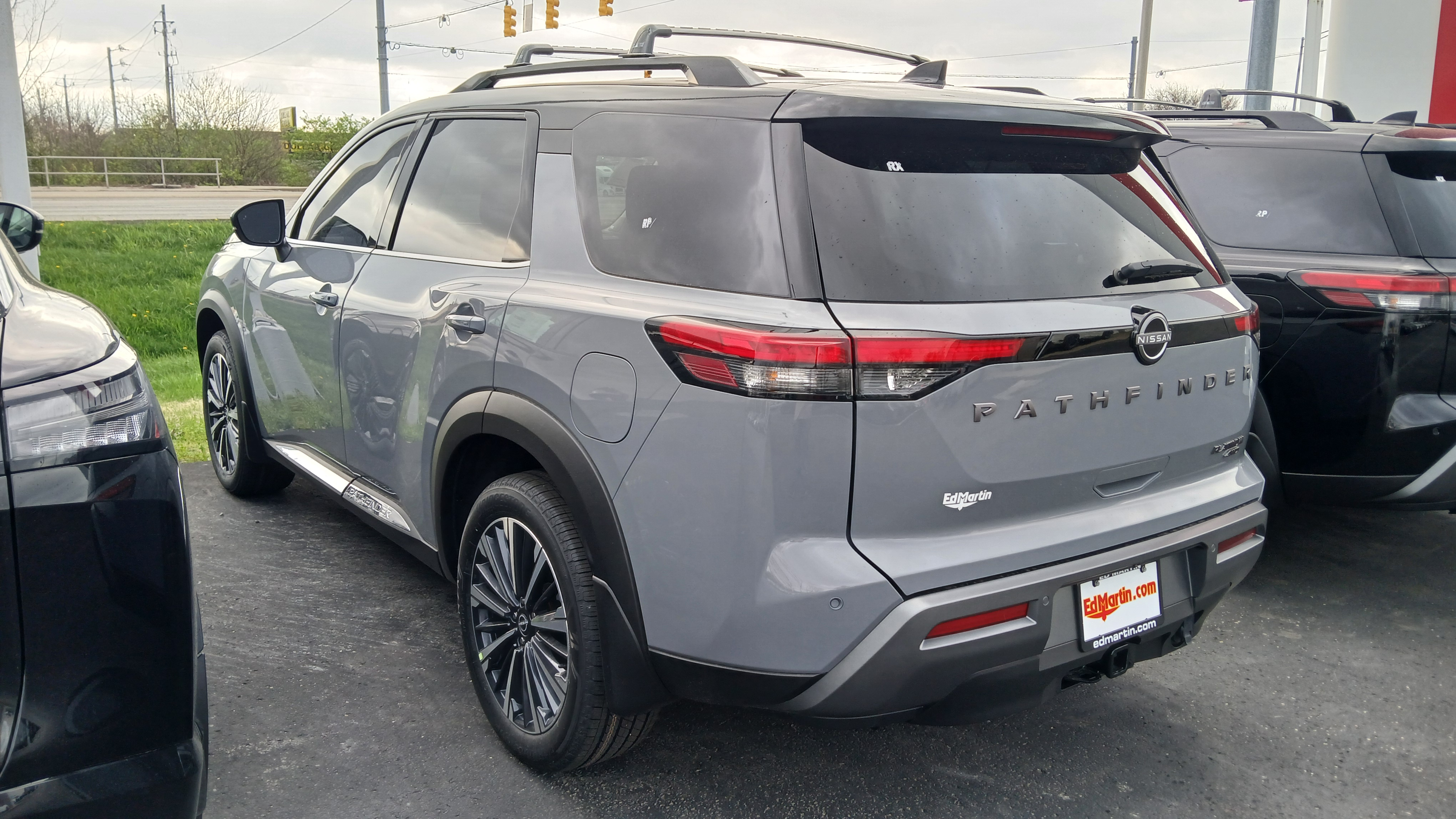
Rear view (facelift)

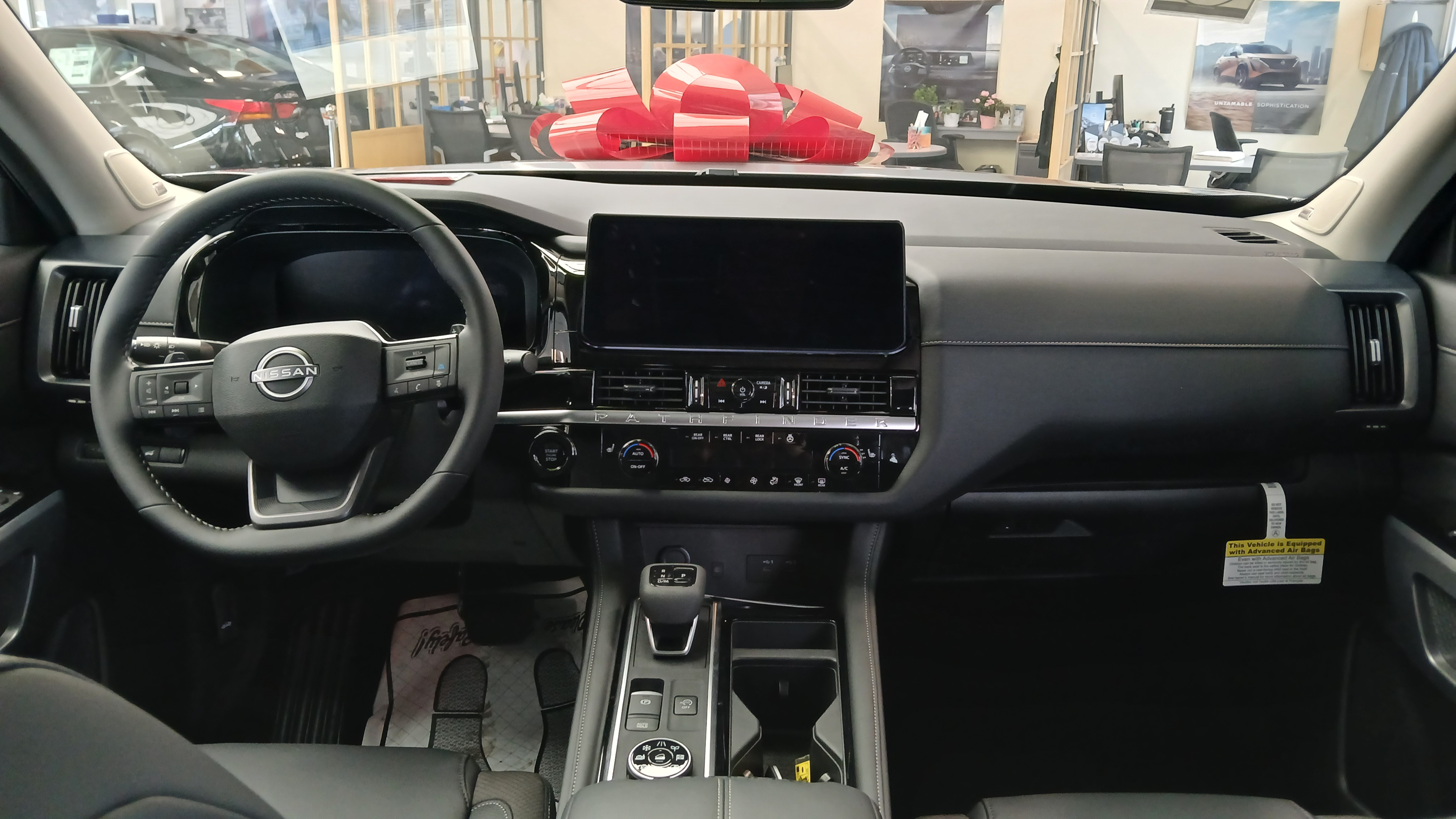
Interior (facelift)

=== Chinese version (2023) ===
Fifth generation (China)
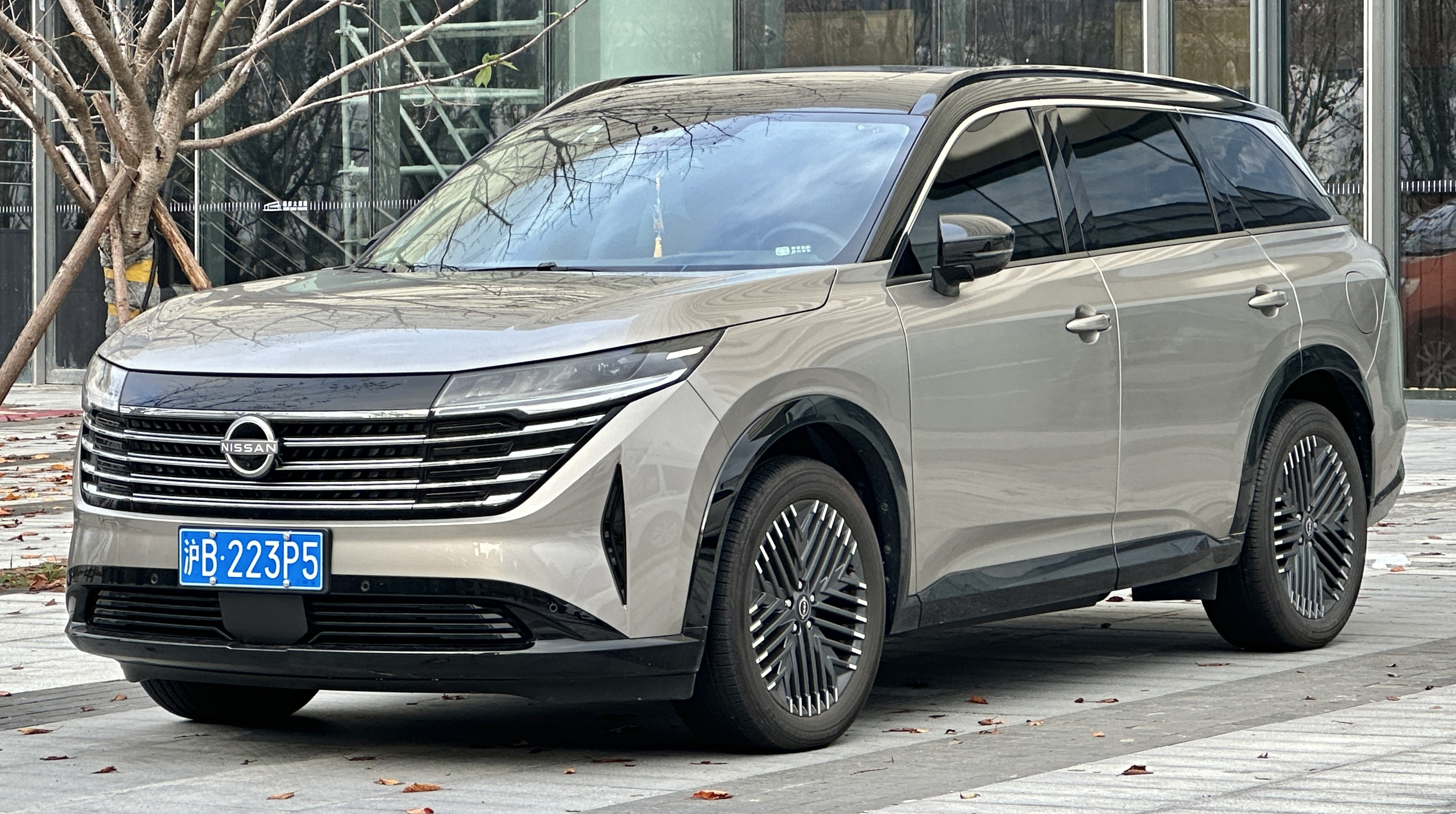

Overview
- Model code: R53
- Production: December 2023 – present
- Assembly: China: (Dongfeng Nissan)

Body and chassis
- Class: Mid-size crossover SUV
- Body style: 5-door SUV
- Layout: Front-engine, front-wheel-drive; Front-engine, all-wheel-drive
- Platform: Nissan D platform
- Chassis: Unibody
- Related: Infiniti QX60 (L51)

Powertrain
- Engine: Petrol: 2.0 L KR20DDET I4

Dimensions
- Wheelbase: 2,900 mm (114.2 in)
- Length: 5,130 mm (202.0 in)
- Width: 1,981 mm (78.0 in)
- Height: 1,767 mm (69.6 in)

A concept version of the Pathfinder was unveiled at the 2023 Auto Shanghai show, visually different from the North American version. The production model was released in November 2023 at the Auto Guangzhou. Based on the US-made Pathfinder, the Chinese market Pathfinder (Chinese: 探陆; pinyin: tàn lù; lit. 'explore the land') is powered by a 2.0-litre KR20DDET turbocharged engine.

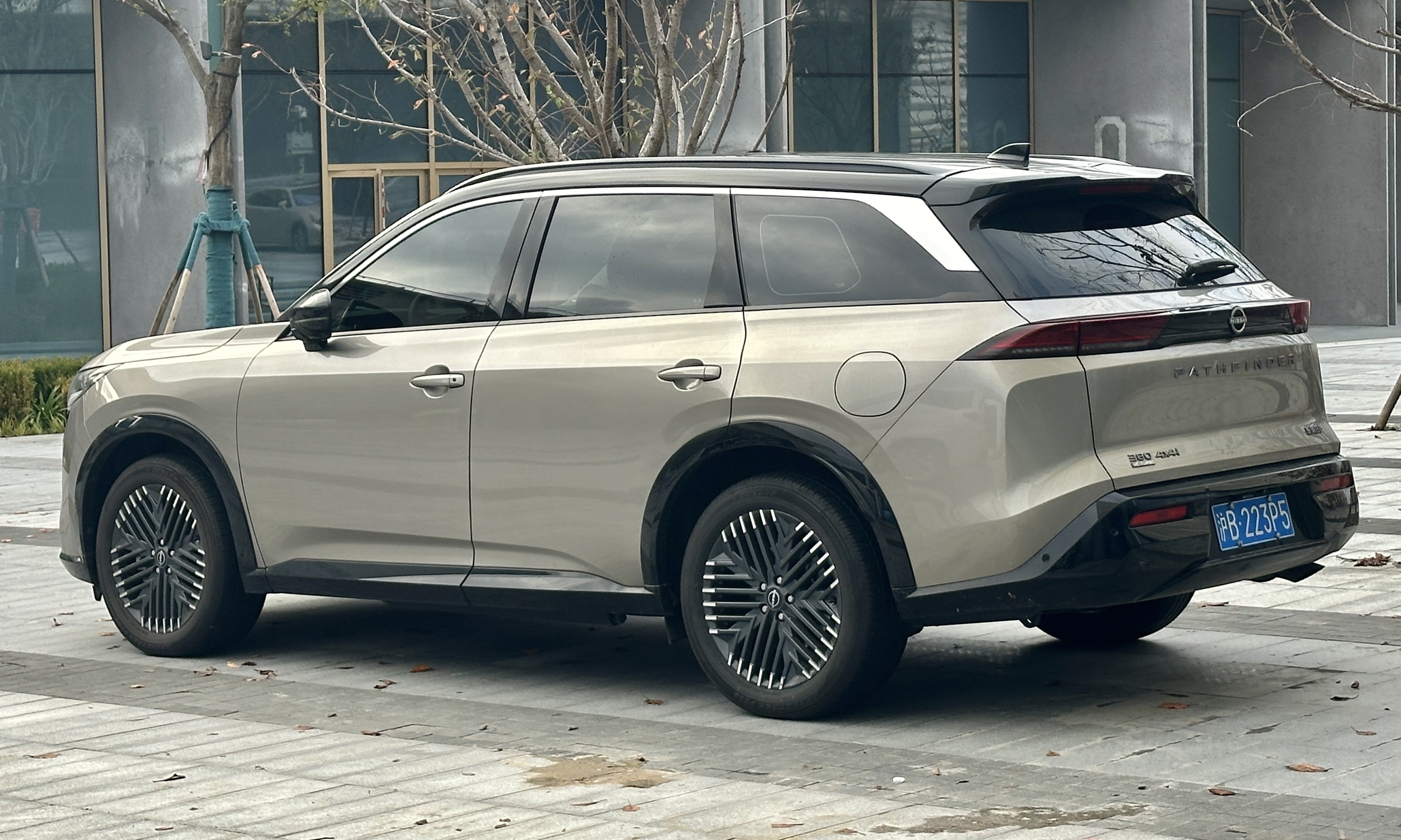
Rear view

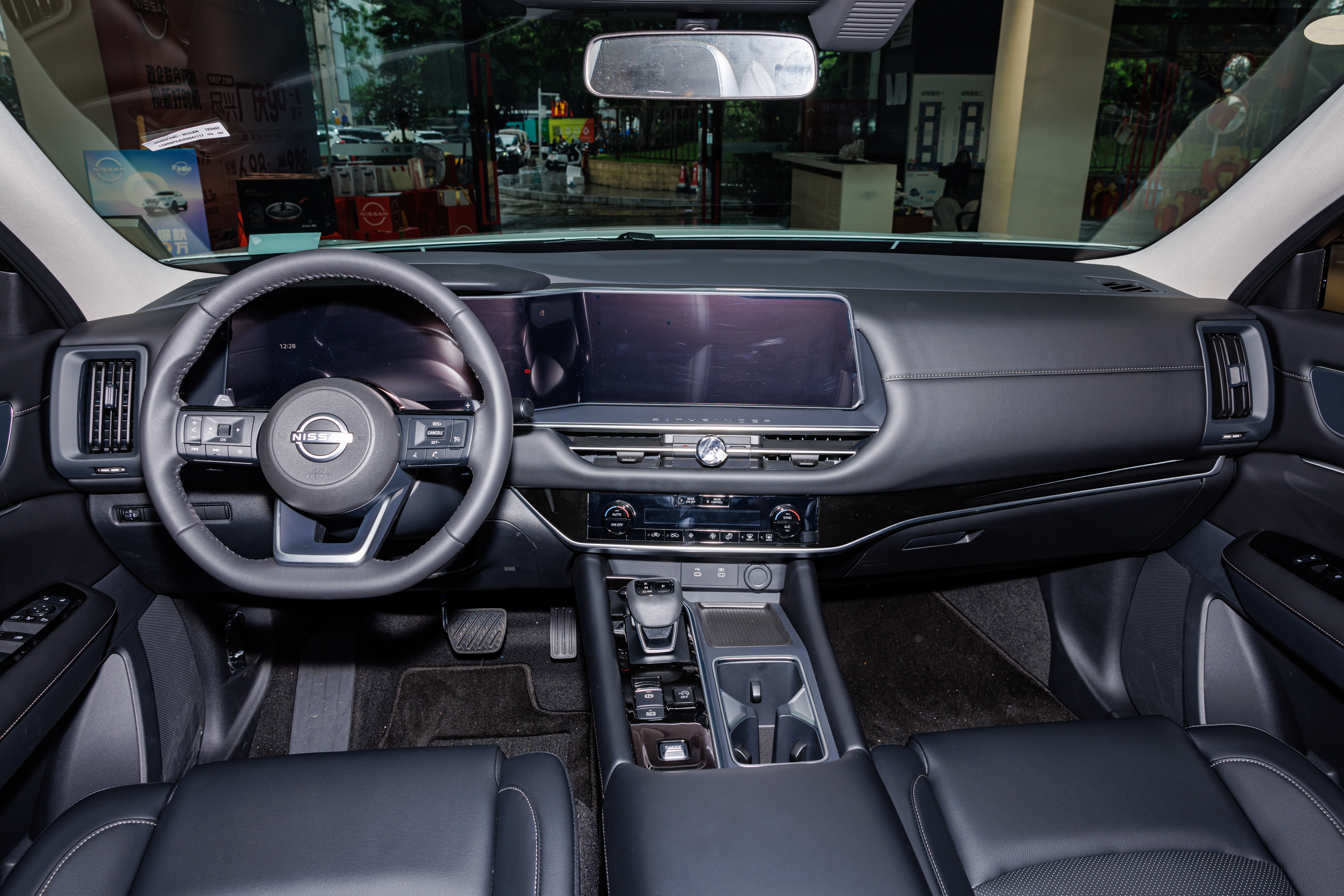
Interior

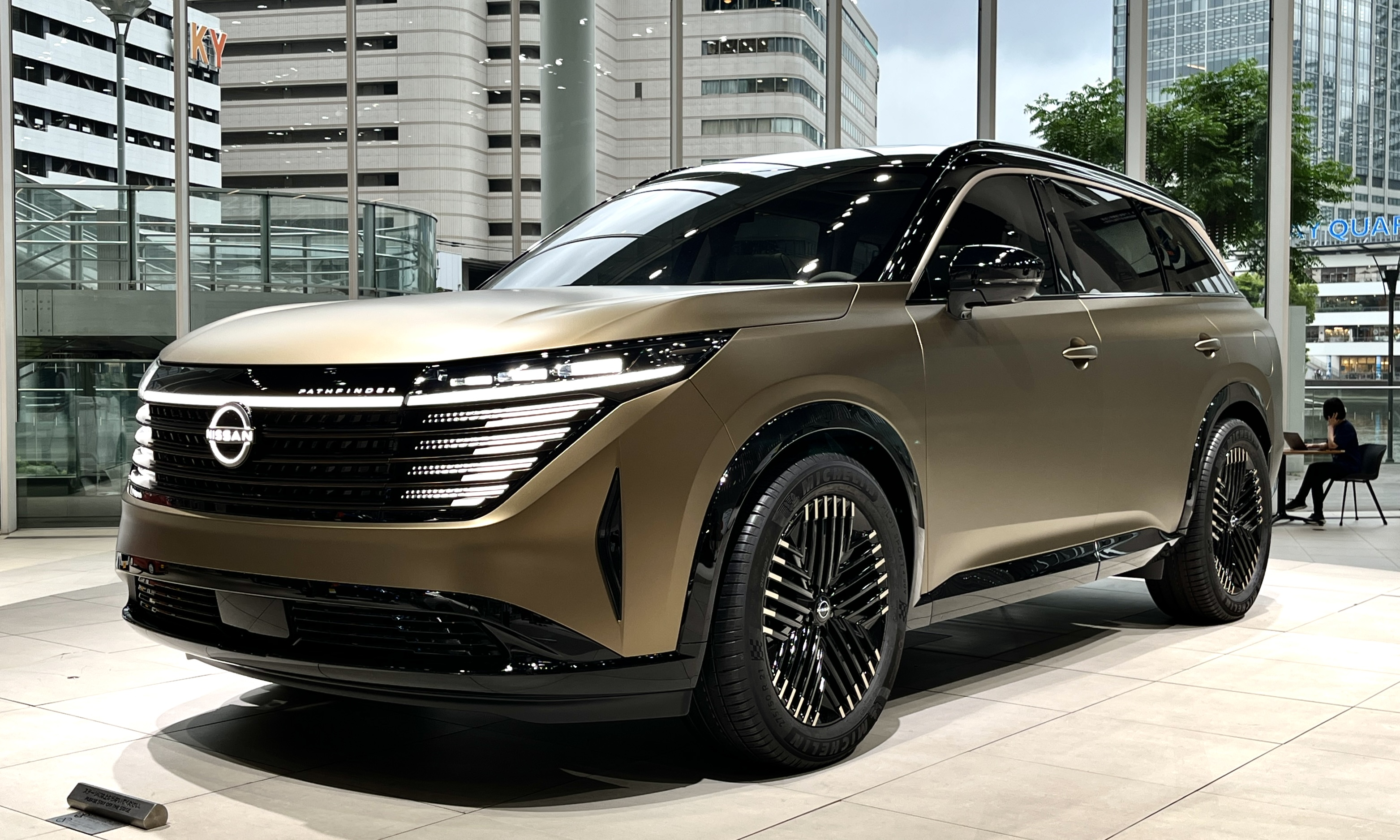
Nissan Pathfinder Concept (China)

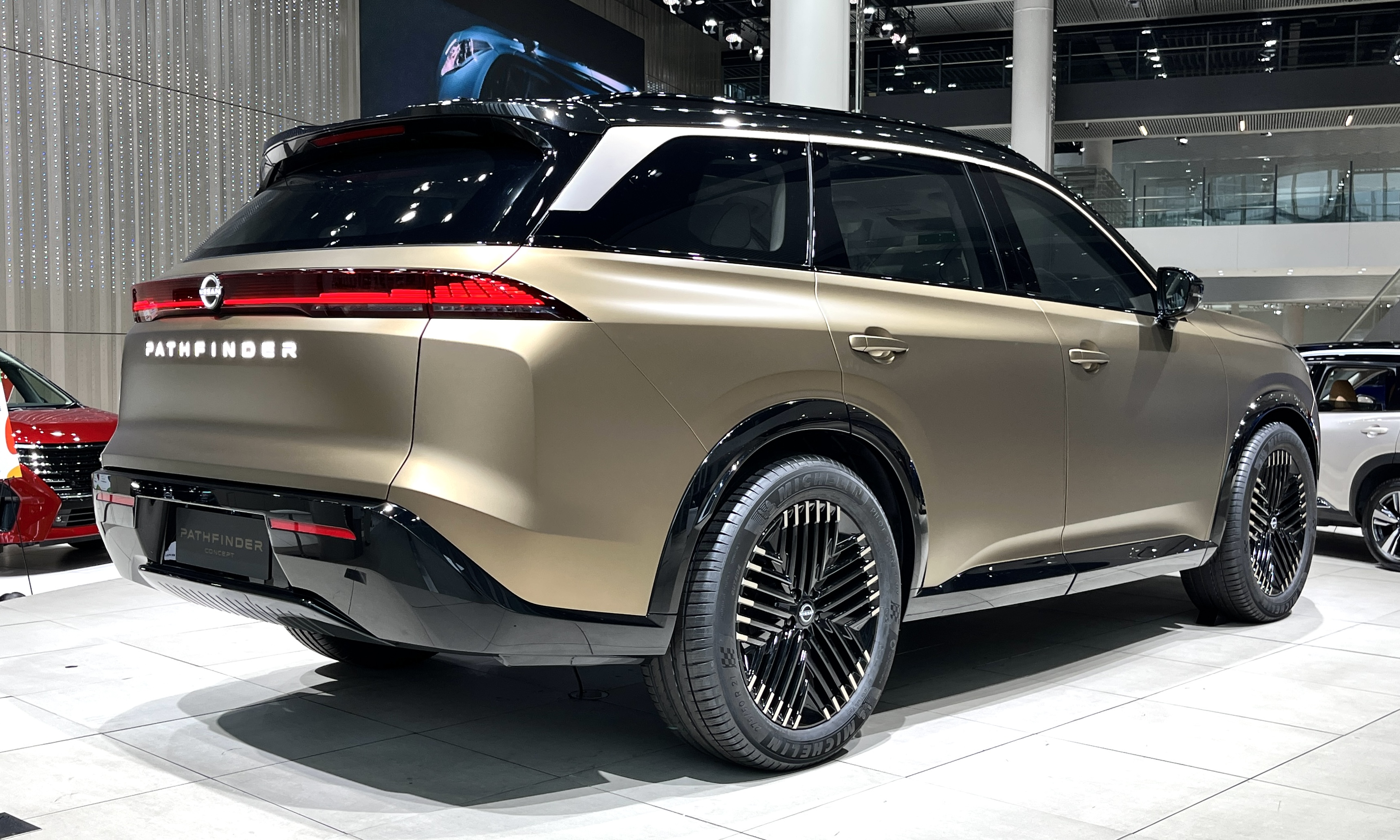
Nissan Pathfinder Concept (China)

=== Awards and recognition ===
In 2022, MotorWeek named the Pathfinder the Best Midsize Utility in its Drivers’ Choice Awards, and Parents.com included the Pathfinder among its Best Family Cars the same year. Cars.com listed the Pathfinder among its Best Cars for Car Seats in 2024, and it was listed again in 2025, when it also ranked 20th on the American-Made Index published by Cars.com.

=== Safety ===
The 2022–present Pathfinder includes Nissan Safety Shield 360, a suite of driver-assistance technologies including automatic emergency braking, blind-spot warning, rear cross-traffic alert, lane-departure warning, and high-beam assist.

The Pathfinder received the Insurance Institute for Highway Safety's (IIHS) Top Safety Pick+ designation for the 2022–2025 model years.

Test	2022	2023	2024	2025
Small overlap front	Good	Good	Good	Good
Moderate overlap front	Good	Good	Good	Good
Side impact	Good	Good	Good	Good

Outside North America, the Pathfinder received a five-star safety rating from the Australasian New Car Assessment Program (ANCAP) when tested in 2022. This rating applies to all variants sold in Australia and New Zealand from December 2022 onward.

ANCAP test results Nissan Pathfinder (2022, aligned with Euro NCAP)
Test	Points	%
Overall:	5 /5 stars	
Adult occupant:	32.87	86%
Child occupant:	45.80	93%
Pedestrian:	42.31	78%
Safety assist:	13.61	85%

== Sales ==
Calendar year	United States	Canada	Australia	Europe	China
2000			3,772	657	
2001			3,036	581	
2002			2,628	294	
2003			2,505	145	
2004			1,390	83	
2005	76,149	4,101	2,456	16,156	
2006	73,124	3,027	4,148	18,406	
2007	63,056	1,944	2,740	14,701	
2008	33,555	1,196	2,276	7,166	
2009	18,341	815	1,780	3,663	
2010	21,438	1,400	1,620	2,788	
2011	25,935	1,880	2,318	4,274	
2012	42,621	2,666	2,695	3,124	
2013	88,632	7,936	2,085	1,868	
2014	79,111	9,688	5,343	1,867	
2015	82,041	9,898	6,433	388	
2016	81,701	9,670	5,560	6	
2017	81,065	9,839	4,502	3	
2018	67,550	7,099	3,825	5	
2019	65,691	5,704	2,712		
2020	48,579	3,392	1,118		
2021	41,324	3,243	146		
2022	57,862	4,776	188		
2023	71,710	6,773	1,401		1
2024	80,915	7,120	523		12,001
2025	101,598	3,267	732		6,846
