= Nissan ZD engine =

Overview
- Manufacturer: Nissan Motors
- Production: 1999-present

Layout
- Configuration: Inline-4
- Valvetrain: DOHC 4 valves x cyl.

Combustion
- Turbocharger: on all but DD-engines
- Fuel system: Direct injection
- Management: Drive by wire
- Fuel type: Diesel
- Cooling system: Water-cooled

Output
- Power output: 77–130 kW (103–174 hp)
- Torque output: 209–540 N⋅m (154–398 lbf⋅ft)

The Nissan ZD30 engine family is a 3.0-litre (2,953 cc) inline-four cylinder diesel engine with a bore and stroke of 96 mm × 102 mm (3.78 in × 4.02 in), that replaced the Nissan QD, BD and TD engines. At Renault it also replaced the Sofim 8140 engine and is the only truck diesel engine which remained with Nissan Motors when they sold Nissan Diesel to Volvo trucks in 2007.

== Design ==
It features a cast-iron crank case, which is horizontally divided in the crank shaft plane into a lower and an upper part. A set of gear driven balance shafts is located slightly higher than the crankshaft, the vacuum pump is placed on the gear cover and driven by the RH (intake side) balance shaft. The Gerotor oil pump is also located on the front side of the crankshaft. A serpentine belt with hydraulic tensioner powers the a/c compressor, the water pump, and (via a freewheeling pulley to reduce squeaking when engine decelerates) the alternator. A Dual-mass flywheel may be used with manual transmissions.

The aluminium-alloy Crossflow cylinder head houses two camshafts (DOHC) driven by a combined gear and chain drive operating 4 valves per cylinder (16 in total) by bucket tappets. Exhaust is on the LH side which makes an “exhaust forward” arrangement when the engine is installed transversally. Even the first series of "mechanical" engines have an ECU with Electronic throttle control (Drive by wire), MAF sensor (not for engines with 96 kW and below), advanced lube oil monitoring etc. Turbocharged and intercooled engines have Swirl flaps incorporated into the intake manifold to improve combustion at low revs.These engines also feature Nissan’s Variable Valve Lift technology.

The original versions of this engine were introduced in 1999, utilizing a VP44 distributor injection pump, and represent the transition from the former naturally aspirated, all mechanical, ohv engines with swirl combustion chamber (except the truck engine BD30 with direct injection) to the later 2nd generation common rail DOHC design. The ECU's functionality has been improved during the life time of this first generation and with the introduction of the later Common Rail engines.

== ZD30DD ==
The base ZD30DD engine was naturally aspirated with a VP44 distributor injection pump, had 77 kW (105 PS) at 3800 rpm and 226 N⋅m (167 lbf⋅ft) at 2000 rpm, compression ratio was 18.5:1. On the Nissan Caravan with manual transmission torque was limited to 209 N⋅m (154 lb⋅ft)). Application:

- 04/2001-08/2004 Nissan Caravan/Urvan/Homy E25 and rebadged as Isuzu Como
- 2002–2008 Thairung NISSAN FREELIFE
- Nissan Trade

== ZD30DDT ==
This engine was supplemented with a turbocharger, non intercooled, 110 kW (150 PS) at 3400 rpm and 314 N⋅m (232 lbf⋅ft) at 2000 rpm, compression ratio 17.9:1. Application:

- 2001–2006 Nissan Navara/Frontier D22
- 2002–2008 Thairung NISSAN SUPER XCITER

== 1st Generation ZD30DDTI (2000–2006) ==
This engine was upgraded with an intercooler and still utilized a VP44 distributor injection pump, which may create confusion because later Common Rail engines have the same engine denomination. Several power levels were available.

1.) 89 kW (121 PS) at 3200 rpm, 265 N⋅m (195 lbf⋅ft) at 1600-3200 rpm

- 09/2002-08/2004 Nissan Caravan/Urvan/Homy E25, also rebadged as Isuzu Como

2.) 96 kW (131 PS) at 3450 rpm, 265 N⋅m (195 lbf⋅ft) at 1600-3450 rpm

- 08/2004-~2007 Nissan Caravan/Urvan/Homy E25, also rebadged as Isuzu Como

3.) 116 kW (158 PS) at 3600 rpm, 352 N⋅m (260 lbf⋅ft) resp. 333 N⋅m (246 lbf⋅ft) (MT) at 1800 rpm

- 09/1999-08/2002 Nissan Patrol Y61

4.) 125 kW (170 PS) at 3600 rpm, 353 N⋅m (260 lbf⋅ft) at 1800 rpm

- 02/1999-08/2002 Nissan Pathfinder/Terrano R50
- 1999-2006 Nissan Terrano II R20 (Europe only)
- 08/1999-05/2002 Elgrand E50

== 2nd Generation ZD30DDTI CRD/Common Rail Injection (2007) ==
This major revision of the ZD30 became available in MY 2007. At that time the previously offered TD42Ti was discontinued due to failing updated EURO IV emission standards and was replaced by the commonrail ZD30DDTI engine. Bosch injection equipment was utilized with a 1600 bar system pressure and an improved ECU. Compression ratio was 17.9:1, to keep emissions low a hot EGR with heat exchanger was also installed. Beginning in 2012, this was gradually replaced by the smaller but equally powerful YD25DDTi engine.

1.) The common rail ZD30 engines were first seen on Renault Master and Renault Mascott in 2004, three years before the introduction by Nissan. The Renault Master is the only known transversal installation of this engine. By Renault the engines may have been named ZD3 or DXI 3.

- 2003-~2007 Renault Master, 100 kW (136 PS) at 3600 rpm and 320 N⋅m (236 lb⋅ft) at 1800 rpm
- 2004-2007 Renault Mascott, 85 kW (116 PS) at 3600 rpm, 270 N⋅m (199 lb⋅ft) at 1300 rpm
- 2004-2007 Renault Mascott, 115 kW (156 PS) at 3600 rpm, 350 N⋅m (258 lb⋅ft) at 1500 rpm
- 81 kW (110 PS) on Fuso Canter Guts

2.) Initially this power level offered 96 kW (129 hp) at 3600 rpm, 260 N⋅m (190 lbf⋅ft) at 1600-3400 rpm, but was slightly improved to 96 kW (131 PS) at 3400 rpm, 300 N⋅m (220 lbf⋅ft) at 1100-3000 rpm while engines were modified to comply with stricter emission requirements (Euro VI at present).

- 2007–2010 Renault Mascott
- 2007-06/2012 Nissan Caravan/Urvan/Homy E25, also rebadged as Isuzu Como
- 2007- Nissan NT400/Atlas F24, also rebadged as UD / Condor CARGO, Isuzu Elf 100, Mitsubishi Fuso Canter Guts

3.) Initially this power level offered 110 kW (150 PS) at 3600 rpm, 350 N⋅m (258 lb⋅ft) at 1600 rpm, but was slightly improved to 110 kW (150 PS) at 3400 rpm, 350 N⋅m (258 lb⋅ft) at 1800–2500 rpm or 2000 rpm while engines were modified to comply with stricter emission requirements.

- 2007–2010 Renault Mascott
- 2006–2013 Nissan Atleon (Euro V/EEV) (for 3.5 ton and 5.6 ton GVWR models)
- 2007- Nissan NT400/Atlas F24, also rebadged as UD / Condor CARGO, Isuzu Elf 100, Mitsubishi Fuso Canter Guts
- 06/2008-07/2010 Nissan Civilian W41, also rebadged as Isuzu Journey
- 2013-~2018 Nissan NT500 (successor of the Atleon)
- Nissan Patrol 118 kW (160 PS) at 3600 rpm, MT: 380 N⋅m (280 lb⋅ft) at 2000 rpm, AT: 354 N⋅m (261 lb⋅ft) at 2000 rpm
- Nissan Patrol 125 kW (170 PS) at 3600 rpm, 360 N⋅m (266 lb⋅ft) at 1800 rpm

== ZD30DDTT ==
This engine is based on the 2nd generation ZD30DDTI but features twin turbo charging, Euro VI, 130 kW (177 PS) at 2600 rpm, 540 N⋅m (400 lbf⋅ft) at 1400–2200 rpm.

- 2013-~2018 Nissan NT500 (successor of the Atleon)

== Remark ==
There is also a ZD25 engine built in China, where it is also known as the DK4A diesel engine. With a 92 mm × 94 mm (3.62 in × 3.70 in) bore and stroke, it displaces 2.5 L (2,498 cc) and produces 75 kW (102 PS) with common rail injection and an intercooler.

== See also ==
List of Nissan engines
