= Jaso =

Jaso or JASO may refer to:

- Jaso State, a princely state in British India
- Japanese Automotive Standards Organization (JASO), an organization that sets automotive standards in Japan
  - JASO T904, a quality classification standard of four stroke motor oils - it contains JASO T904-MA, JASO T904-MA2 and JASO T904-MB; see Motor oil#JASO
  - JASO M345, a quality classification standard of two stroke motor oils – it contains JASO FA, JASO FB, JASO FC and JASO FD
- Journal of the Anthropological Society of Oxford, an academic anthropology journal
- Jaso (자소), a letter part that makes up a block in Korean writing, in type design or IME automata
- Jaso (surname)
