= Two-stroke oil =

Type of motor oil

Two-stroke oil (also referred to as two-cycle oil, 2-cycle oil, 2T oil, or 2-stroke oil) is a type of motor oil intended for use in crankcase compression two-stroke engines, typical of small gasoline-powered engines.

== Use ==
Unlike a four-stroke engine, the crankcase of which is closed except for its ventilation system, a two-stroke engine uses the crankcase as part of the induction tract, so oil must be mixed with gasoline to be distributed throughout the engine for lubrication. The resultant mix is referred to as premix or petroil. The oil is ultimately burned along with the fuel as a total-loss oiling system. That results in increased exhaust emissions, sometimes with excess smoke and/or a distinctive odor.

The oil-base stock can be petroleum, castor oil, semi-synthetic or synthetic oil, and is mixed (or metered by injection) with petrol/gasoline at a volumetric fuel-to-oil ratio ranging from 16:1 to as low as 100:1. To avoid high emissions and oily deposits on spark plugs, modern two-strokes, particularly small engines powering such items as garden equipment and chainsaws, may now require a synthetic oil, and can suffer from oiling problems otherwise.

Engine original equipment manufacturers (OEMs) introduced pre-injection systems (sometimes known as "auto-lube") to engines to operate from a 32:1 to 100:1 ratio. Oils must meet or exceed the following typical specifications: TC-W3® (NMMA), API-TC, JASO FC, ISO-L-EGC.

The relevant difference between regular lubricating oil and two-stroke oil is that the latter must have a much lower ash content, to minimize deposits that tend to form if ash is present in the oil when it is burned in the engine's combustion chamber. Additionally, a non-2T-specific oil can turn to gum in a matter of days if mixed with gasoline and not immediately consumed. Another important factor is that four-stroke engines have a different requirement for "stickiness" than do two-strokes.

Since the 1980s, different types of two-stroke oil have been developed for specialized uses, such as outboard motor two-strokes, as well as the more standard auto lube (motorcycle) two-stroke oil. As a rule of thumb, it will be stated somewhere on the printed label of most containers of oil available commercially, that it is compatible with "Autolube" or injector pumps. Those oils tend to have the consistency of liquid dish soap if shaken. A more viscous oil cannot reliably be passed through an injection system, although a premix can be used on either type.

"Racing" oil or castor-based does offer excellent lubrication, at the expense of premature cooking. The average moped/scooter/trail rider will not achieve an appreciable increase in performance and will require very frequent teardowns.

== Additive ingredients ==
Additives for two-stroke oils fall into several general categories: Detergent/Dispersants, Antiwear agents, Biodegradability components and antioxidants (Zinc compounds). Some of the higher quality include a fuel stabilizer as well.

== Standards ==
The current international standard (ISO 13738) for two-stroke gasoline engine oil evolved from JASO M345, which were grades intended to exceed API-TC. Grades include:

- JASO FA is abandoned. It is not put in ISO.
- JASO FB evolved into ISO L-EGB, with additional test for piston cleanliness.
- JASO FC evolved into ISO L-EGC, with additional test for piston cleanliness.
- JASO FD evolved into ISO L-EGD, with additional test for piston cleanliness and detergent effect.

The National Marine Manufacturers Association (NMMA) of the USA maintains its own TC-W line of standards.
