= List of Valencia CF managers =

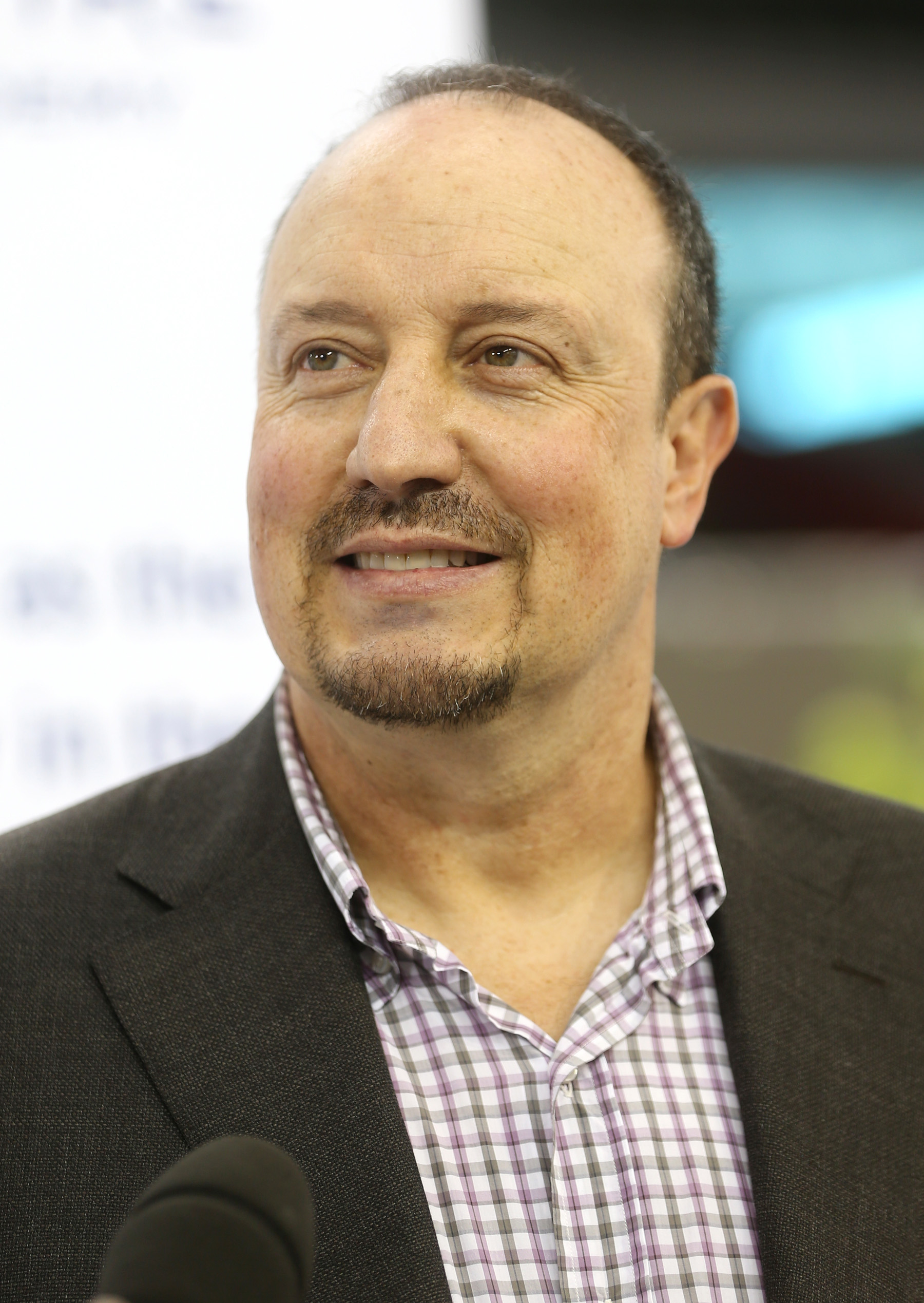
Rafael Benítez is Valencia's most successful manager, having won two league titles and a UEFA Cup

Valencia has had 63 managers in its history.

The first manager was the Czechoslovak Antonin Fivebr, who was at the club from 1923 until 1927, and in a second stint at the club from 1929 until 1931.

Of the 63 people to have managed Valencia, 37 have been Spaniards and 26 foreigners. In some cases, the Spaniards have been former Valencia players that agreed to take charge after the sacking of the regular manager that season, as were the cases of Eduardo Cubells, Pasieguito, Manolo Mestre or Carlos Corberán.

The main nationalities barring Spaniards have been Argentinian (6 managers), English (4), Italian and Yugoslav (3). The club has also had two Uruguayan managers, two Brazilians, two Dutch, a Paraguayan, a Frenchman, a Serb, a Portuguese, a Czechoslovak and a Mexican. While the origin of the majority of the Spanish managers has been Valencian (11) and Basque (8).

== List ==
Information correct as of 22 November 2026. Only competitive matches are counted.

Name	Nationality	From	To	Matches	Won	Drawn	Lost	Win (%)	Honours
Kinké	Spain	1921	1922	-	-	-	-	-	
Agustín Sancho	Spain	1922	1923	-	-	-	-	-	
Antonin Fivebr	Czechoslovakia	1923	1927	-	-	-	-	-	
Jimmy Elliott	England	1927	1929	-	-	-	-	-	
Antonin Fivebr	Czechoslovakia	1929	1931	-	-	-	-	-	
Rodolfo Galloway	England	14 August 1931	30 June 1933	49	15	10	24	30.61	
Jack Greenwell	England	1 July 1933	28 November 1934	27	12	4	11	44.44	
Antonin Fivebr	Czechoslovakia	1934	8 November 1935	28	12	3	13	42.86	
Andrés Balsa	Spain	8 November 1935	1936	25	8	5	12	32	
Ramón Encinas Dios	Spain	1939	30 June 1942	93	52	13	28	55.91	1 La Liga; 1 Copa del Rey
Leopoldo Costa "Rino"	Spain	11 July 1942	11 April 1943	26	10	7	9	38.46	
Eduardo Cubells	Spain	15 April 1943	1946	113	59	24	30	52.21	1 La Liga
Luis Casas Pasarín	Spain	1946	1948	63	35	9	19	55.56	1 La Liga
Jacinto Quincoces	Spain	24 June 1948	30 June 1954	204	111	34	59	54.41	2 Copa del Rey; 1 Copa Eva Duarte
Carlos Iturraspe	Spain	1954	30 June 1956	67	31	10	26	46.27	
Luis Miró	Spain	1 July 1956	30 December 1958	85	32	25	28	37.65	
Jacinto Quincoces	Spain	30 December 1958	15 September 1959	25	13	3	9	52	
Pedro Otto Bumbel	Brazil	15 September 1959	30 June 1960	35	14	6	15	40	
Domingo Balmanya	Spain	17 July 1960	30 June 1962	82	36	26	20	43.9	
Alejandro Scopelli	Argentina	1 July 1962	30 June 1963	52	25	8	19	48.08%	2 Fairs Cup
Bernardino Pérez "Pasieguito"	Spain	1 July 1963	15 January 1964	20	8	2	10	40	
"Mundo"	Spain	15 January 1964	30 June 1965	65	36	8	21	55.38	
Sabino Barinaga	Spain	1 July 1965	14 May 1966	41	17	7	17	41.46	
"Mundo"	Spain	14 May 1966	15 October 1968	94	47	14	33	50	1 Copa del Rey
José Iglesias Fernández	Spain	15 October 1968	15 October 1969	36	10	14	12	27.78	
Enrique Buqué/Salvador Artigas	Spain	15 October 1969	30 June 1970	34	19	5	10	55.88	
Alfredo Di Stéfano	Argentina	1 July 1970	18 June 1974	170	81	41	48	47.65	1 La Liga
Milovan Ćirić	Yugoslavia	13 July 1974	8 April 1975	31	11	9	11	35.48	
Dragoljub Milošević	Yugoslavia	11 April 1975	21 September 1975	10	4	0	6	40	
Manolo Mestre	Spain	21 September 1975	30 June 1976	35	13	9	13	37.14	
Heriberto Herrera	Paraguay	1 July 1976	22 February 1977	27	13	6	8	48.15	
Manolo Mestre	Spain	22 February 1977	30 June 1977	15	5	5	5	33.33	
Marcel Domingo	France	1 July 1977	27 March 1979	82	38	16	28	46.34	
Bernardino Pérez "Pasieguito"	Spain	27 March 1979	30 June 1979	15	9	2	4	60	1 Copa del Rey
Alfredo Di Stéfano	Argentina	1 July 1979	30 June 1980	45	20	10	15	44.44	1 UEFA Cup Winners' Cup
Bernardino Pérez "Pasieguito"	Spain	1 July 1980	4 January 1982	68	34	12	22	50	1 UEFA Super Cup
Manolo Mestre	Spain	4 January 1982	1 November 1982	32	12	7	13	37.5	
Miljan Miljanić	Yugoslavia	1 November 1982	9 March 1983	24	6	6	12	25	
Koldo Aguirre	Spain	9 March 1983	30 June 1983	10	3	3	4	30	
Paquito García	Spain	1 July 1983	10 February 1984	30	10	7	13	33.33	
Roberto Gil	Spain	10 February 1984	27 May 1985	60	22	20	18	36.67	
Óscar Rubén Valdez	Spain	27 May 1985	28 January 1986	30	10	8	12	33.33	
Alfredo Di Stéfano	Argentina	29 January 1986	22 March 1988	88	35	23	30	39.77	
Roberto Gil (es)	Spain	22 March 1988	30 June 1988	9	2	5	2	22.22	
Víctor Espárrago	Uruguay	1 July 1988	30 June 1991	134	61	42	31	45.52	
Guus Hiddink	Netherlands	1 July 1991	15 November 1993	109	55	24	30	50.46	
Paco Real	Spain	15 November 1993	15 December 1993	4	1	1	2	25	
Héctor Núñez	Uruguay	15 December 1993	10 March 1994	14	3	5	6	21.43	
José Manuel Rielo	Spain	10 March 1994	24 March 1994	2	2	0	0	100	
Guus Hiddink	Netherlands	24 March 1994	30 June 1994	9	3	4	2	33.33	
Carlos Alberto Parreira	Brazil	1 August 1994	5 June 1995	45	17	13	15	37.78	
José Manuel Rielo	Spain	5 June 1995	30 June 1995	4	2	1	1	50	
Luis Aragonés	Spain	3 July 1995	14 November 1996	68	37	12	19	54.41	
José Manuel Rielo	Spain	14 November 1996	22 November 1996	2	1	1	0	50	
Jorge Valdano	Argentina	22 November 1996	15 September 1997	37	11	11	15	29.73	
Claudio Ranieri	Italy	20 September 1997	30 June 1999	96	50	18	28	52.08	1 Copa del Rey; 1 UEFA Intertoto Cup
Héctor Cúper	Argentina	1 July 1999	30 June 2001	120	59	30	31	49.17	1 Supercopa de España
Rafael Benítez	Spain	1 July 2001	30 June 2004	163	87	43	33	53.37	2 La Liga; 1 UEFA Cup
Claudio Ranieri	Italy	8 July 2004	25 February 2005	36	15	12	9	41.67	1 UEFA Super Cup
Antonio López	Spain	25 February 2005	30 June 2005	14	4	8	2	28.57	
Quique Sánchez Flores	Spain	1 July 2005	29 October 2007	110	57	24	29	51.82	
Óscar Fernández	Spain	29 October 2007	2 November 2007	1	0	0	1	0	
Ronald Koeman	Netherlands	2 November 2007	21 April 2008	34	11	9	14	32.35	1 Copa del Rey
Salvador González "Voro"	Spain	21 April 2008	30 June 2008	5	4	0	1	80	
Unai Emery	Spain	1 July 2008	30 June 2012	218	106	58	54	48.62	
Mauricio Pellegrino	Argentina	1 July 2012	1 December 2012	21	10	4	7	47.62	
Ernesto Valverde	Spain	3 December 2012	1 June 2013	31	17	7	7	54.84	
Miroslav Dukic	Serbia	4 June 2013	16 December 2013	23	11	3	9	47.83	
Juan Antonio Pizzi	Spain	26 December 2013	2 July 2014	31	12	10	9	38.71	
Nuno Espírito Santo	Portugal	4 July 2014	29 November 2015	63	32	16	14	50.79	
Salvador González "Voro"	Spain	30 November 2015	5 December 2015	2	1	1	0	50	
Gary Neville	England	2 December 2015	30 March 2016	28	10	7	11	34.62	
Pako Ayestarán	Spain	30 March 2016	20 September 2016	12	3	1	8	25	
Salvador González "Voro"	Spain	20 September 2016	28 September 2016	3	2	0	1	66.67	
Cesare Prandelli	Italy	28 September 2016	30 December 2016	10	3	3	4	30	
Salvador González "Voro"	Spain	30 December 2016	30 June 2017	25	10	4	11	40	
Marcelino	Spain	1 July 2017	11 September 2019	110	55	29	26	50	1 Copa del Rey
Albert Celades	Spain	11 September 2019	29 June 2020	41	15	12	14	36.59	
Salvador González "Voro"	Spain	29 June 2020	19 July 2020	6	2	1	3	33.33	
Javi Gracia	Spain	27 July 2020	3 May 2021	38	11	12	15	28.95	
Salvador González "Voro"	Spain	3 May 2021	25 May 2021	4	2	1	1	50	
José Bordalás	Spain	25 May 2021	3 June 2022	46	17	17	12	36.96	
Gennaro Gattuso	Italy	9 June 2022	30 January 2023	22	7	6	9	31.82	
Salvador González "Voro"	Spain	30 January 2023	14 February 2023	3	0	0	3	0	
Rubén Baraja	Spain	14 February 2023	23 December 2024	78	26	20	32	33.33	
Carlos Corberán	Spain	25 December 2024	13 September 2026	72	28	18	25	38.89	
Óscar Sánchez	Spain	13 September 2026	23 September 2026	2	1	0	1	50	
Javier Aguirre	Mexico	23 September 2026		7	3	2	2	42.86	

== Nationalities ==
- Spain (37):

- Valencian Community (11): Leopoldo Costa Rino, Eduardo Cubells, Óscar Rubén Valdez, Manolo Mestre, Roberto Gil, Paco Real, Jose Manuel Rielo, Óscar Fernandez, Voro, Jose Bordalas and Carlos Corberán.
- (Basque Country (autonomous community)) Basque Country (8): Jacinto Quincoces, Carlos Iturraspe, Bernardino Pérez "Pasieguito", Edmundo Suárez "Mundo", Sabino Barinaga, "Koldo" Aguirre, Unai Emery and Pako Ayestarán.
- Catalonia (5): Luis Miró, Domingo Balmanya, Salvador Artigas, Enrique Buqué and Albert Celades.
- (Community of Madrid) Madrid (3): Luis Aragonés, Rafael Benítez and Quique Sánchez Flores.
- (Galicia (Spain)) Galicia (3): Andrés Balsa, Ramón Encinas Dios and Luis Casas Pasarín.
- Asturias (2): Francisco García "Paquito" and Marcelino García Toral.
- Castile and León (2): José Iglesias Fernández and Rubén Baraja.
- Andalusia (1): Antonio López.
- (Region of Murcia) Murcia (1): Óscar Sánchez.
- Navarre (1): Javi Gracia.

- Argentina (5) Alejandro Scapelli, Alfredo Di Stéfano, Jorge Valdano, Héctor Cúper, Mauricio Pellegrino and Juan Antonio Pizzi.
- England (4): James Herriot, Rodolfo Galloway, Jack Greenwell and Gary Neville.
- Italy (3): Claudio Ranieri, Cesare Prandelli and Gennaro Gattuso.
- (Socialist Federal Republic of Yugoslavia) Yugoslavia (3): Milovan Ciric, Dragoljub Milosevic and Miljan Miljanic.
- Brazil (2): Pedro Otto Bumbel and Carlos Alberto Parreira.
- Uruguay (2): Víctor Espárrago and Héctor Nuñez.
- Netherlands (2): Guus Hiddink and Ronald Koeman.
- Paraguay (1): Heriberto Herrea.
- Czech Republic (1): Anton Fivber.
- France (1): Marcel Domingo.
- Serbia (1): Miroslav Dukic.
- Portugal (1): Nuno Espírito Santo.
- Mexico (1): Javier Aguirre.

== Records ==
=== Most games in all official competitions ===
1. (Argentina) Alfredo Di Stéfano: 303
2. (Spain) Jacinto Quincoces: 229
3. (Spain) Unai Emery: 218
4. (Spain) Rafael Benítez: 163
5. (Spain) Mundo: 159
