= ZD30 =

ZD30 may refer to:

- Nissan ZD engine
- Zero Dark Thirty
