= Jaso (surname) =

Jaso is a Spanish surname. Notable people with the surname include:

- Andrés Jaso (1912–1937), Spanish footballer
- Antxón Jaso (born 1997), Spanish footballer
- John Jaso (born 1983), American former professional baseball first baseman
- Ryan Jaso (born 1983), American music executive and artist manager

== See also ==
- Jaso (disambiguation)
