= Andrés Jaso =

Spanish footballer (1912–1937)

Personal information
- Full name: Andrés Jaso Garde
- Date of birth: 2 April 1912
- Place of birth: Mélida, Spain
- Date of death: 1 October 1937 (aged 25)
- Place of death: Cangas de Onís, Spain
- Position: Forward

Senior career*
| Years | Team | Apps | (Gls) |
| 1928–1930 | Sporting Melidés | | |
| 1930–1931 | Osasuna | | |
| 1931–1932 | Zaragoza | | |
| 1932–1933 | CF Mollet UE | | |
| 1933–1934 | Levante | | |
| 1934–1935 | Valencia | | |
| 1935–1936 | Sporting de Gijón | | |
- * Club domestic league appearances and goals

Andrés Jaso Garde (2 April 1912 – October 1937) was a Spanish footballer who played as a forward for Osasuna and Valencia.

== Career ==
Andrés Jaso was born in the Navarra town of Mélida on 2 April 1912, as the third of five brothers from a humble, peasant family. In his town, he began to stand out for his talent with the ball, making his debut with Sporting Melidés in 1928, aged 16, in a match against Luchana de Pamplona. After being noticed by a local teacher, he joined Osasuna in 1930, becoming a part of the reserve team, with whom he played for one season. He usually returned to his hometown of Mélida at the end of his football seasons, always with "a gift for everyone, such as toys or fabrics".

In 1931, Jaso went to Zaragoza, where he played for Zaragoza CD, and the following year, he moved to Sabadell, where he played for CF Mollet UE from November 1932 to April 1933. He then moved to Valencia to play for Levante FC, where he gained a reputation as a brave and physical player, receiving so many blows that the local press even asked for "armor or a diving suit" for him. He caught the attention of FC Barcelona, who showed interest in signing him, but he instead chose to join Valencia in 1934. He was not used much by Antonín Fivébr, and only participated in one La Liga match against Atlético Madrid. According to the local press of the time, this frustrated career in big teams was the result of Jaso being "more focused on love than on football".

The following year, at the age of 23, after completing the pre-season with Andrés Balsa, Jaso signed for 3,000 pesetas with Sporting de Gijón, then in the Segunda División. Despite suffering a serious fracture at the beginning of the season, he ended up playing 12 games and scoring 8 goals as Sporting narrowly missed the promotion play-offs after drawing on the last day against Celta de Vigo.

== Death ==
His career was cut short by the outbreak of the Spanish Civil War, during which all traces of him were lost, although certain sources suggest that he died during an air raid from the national side's aviation, probably on the beach of Cangas de Onís in Gijón, where he was training with his Sporting teammates. Jaso was able to spend the summer of 1937 with his girlfriend, a fashion designer, and his friends from the team, and there is even photographic documents that show him playing a game with friends wearing an uncertain shirt: either that of Estrella Roja de Ceares or that of Estrella de Gijón. It is known that in October 1937, Jaso was called up in Gijón to defend the Republic, and thanks to the Spanish Red Cross, the Jaso family received two letters from Andrés, one from 10 October 1937, stating "We are fine", and another without a date, stating "Dead by bombing"; and in fact, on 27 October 1937, Asturias was already in the hands of the rebels.

== Legacy ==
In 2007, the name of Andrés Jaso Garde and that of his brothers Aurelio and José, appeared in the list of 69 people from the "Association of Relatives of Shotgunned and Disappeared Persons of Navarra" who suffered violence or persecution during the Civil War and the dictatorship, whose memory was recognized in an event organized by the Parliament of Navarra. Thanks to the work of journalist Mikel Huarte, who has written the book Rojos: Fútbol, política y represión en Osasuna, the story of Andrés Jaso, among others, became known.

One of his nieces, Áurea Jaso, searched for the bodies of her father and her uncles since she was a child until as late as 2020, aged 93. After months of investigation, it was believed that it was possible to find their remains in a mass grave in Cangas de Onís to finally give them a decent burial after more than eighty years of disappearance. To this end, Áurea launched, with the help of people committed to Historical Memory, a campaign called "Andrés Jaso Project, the missing footballer".
