= Nissan TD engine =

Nissan Diesel engine, used in London cabs

Overview
- Manufacturer: Nissan
- Production: 1986-present

Layout
- Configuration: Inline-4 & Inline-6
- Displacement: 2,289–4,169 cc (139.7–254.4 cu in)
- Cylinder bore: 89 mm (3.50 in); 93 mm (3.66 in); 96 mm (3.78 in)
- Piston stroke: 92 mm (3.62 in); 96 mm (3.78 in)
- Valvetrain: OHV

Combustion
- Turbocharger: On some versions
- Fuel system: Swirl-chamber injection
- Fuel type: Diesel
- Cooling system: Water-cooled

Output
- Power output: 75–160 PS (55–118 kW; 74–158 bhp)
- Torque output: 151–338 N⋅m (15.4–34.5 kg⋅m; 111–250 lb⋅ft)

Chronology
- Predecessor: Nissan SD engine
- Successor: Nissan QD engine Nissan ZD engine

The Nissan TD series is a series of diesel engines manufactured by Nissan. All TD-series engines are inline engines; most versions are four-cylinders aside from the six-cylinder TD42. They have cast iron blocks and crossflow heads, and have swirl-chamber injection (IDI). The valves are pushrod-actuated, and the engine has two valves per cylinder; the camshaft is driven by a set of gears (OHV). Of a simple, somewhat old-fashioned construction, the engines are generally durable if not very powerful.

== Straight-four ==
=== TD23 ===
The TD23 has a bore and stroke of 89 mm × 92 mm (3.50 in × 3.62 in) and thus displaces 2,289 cc (139.7 cu in). Its compression ratio is 22.0:1. It is the least common of the TD series engines, and ended production around 1995.

Outputs

- 76 PS (56 kW; 75 bhp) at 4300 rpm
- 151 N⋅m (15.4 kg⋅m; 111 lb⋅ft) at 2200 rpm

This engine was installed in the 1987-1992 Nissan Pickup (D21); it was also used in the 1986-1988 E24 series Nissan Caravan. It replaced the earlier SD23 engine in Nissan Atlas 1-ton trucks in 1986.

=== TD25 ===
The TD25's bore and stroke are 93 mm × 92 mm (3.66 in × 3.62 in), giving 2,494 cc (152.2 cu in). Period reviewers referred to the unit as "thoroughly viceless" and "a bit bland". This engine was also used by JASO, the Japanese Automotive Standards Organization, for their diesel oil Detergency Test procedure (M 336:1998) from 1998 until 2009, by which time engine assemblies and parts were no longer available.

- 82 PS JIS (60 kW; 81 bhp) at 4300 rpm (JDM)
- 75 PS ECE (55 kW; 74 bhp) at 4300 rpm (Europe)
- 166 N⋅m JIS (16.9 kg⋅m; 122 lb⋅ft) at 2200 rpm (JDM)
- 160 N⋅m ECE (16.3 kg⋅m; 118 lb⋅ft) at 2200 rpm (Europe)

It is applied to the following vehicle(s):

It has been used in the 1990–2015 Nissan Cedric YPY31, the Nissan Navara D21 series, and the 1-ton Nissan Atlas F23 series from 1995 to 1999 (sold as the Cabstar in Europe and certain other export markets). It was also used in the Nissan Caravan/Urvan (E24).

=== TD27 ===
Bore and stroke are 96 mm × 92 mm (3.78 in × 3.62 in) giving 2,663 cc (162.5 cu in). Maximum power of the naturally aspirated model is 85 PS JIS (63 kW; 84 hp) at 4,300 rpm. A turbocharged version of the TD27 was introduced in 1988. A low output version of this engine intended for forklift use, producing 38 kW (52 PS) at 2,300 rpm, remained in production with GCT (Global Component Technologies, successor company to Nissan Diesel Industrial Engines) as of 2024.

This engine was also exported to the United Kingdom and fitted to LTI's Fairway series, coupled to manual or automatic transmissions also supplied by Nissan. The low-stressed naturally aspirated engine has a strong reputation for reliability. The General Secretary of Britain's Licensed Taxi Drivers' Association (LTDA) referred to the TD27 as "one of the greatest engines ever put in a cab." It was chosen after extensive testing by engineering consultants Ricardo PLC. The company offset the cost of importing engines from Japan by Nissan agreeing to sell 200 Fairways in Japan every year under the "Big Ben" name. The TD27 continued to be installed on the succeeding TX1 series.

The TD27 was mainly fitted to a number of Nissan light duty commercial vehicles and was used as the most common diesel option in Nissan Homy, Caravan, and Urvan vans. Along with the TD23 and TD25, it was also fitted to the D21 series Datsun Truck (also known as Nissan Pickup, Navara, etcetera). The turbocharged versions were also fitted to the Nissan Caravan and its various rebadgings, to the Nissan/Datsun Pickup, the Nissan Terrano SUV (D21 as well as the succeeding R50), and to the Nissan Terrano II (R20; sold as the Mistral in Japan).

The power range of the regular turbocharged versions (TD27T; built from 1985 until 2007) range from 100–115 PS (74–85 kW; 99–113 bhp) depending on fitment; when fitted with an intercooler (TD27Ti) power increases to 125 PS (92 kW; 123 bhp). The most powerful TD27ETi model, introduced in 1995 and built until 2001, is intercooled, and has an electronically controlled distributor-type fuel injection pump. The system was called "electronically controlled fuel injection" by Nissan at the time.

== Straight-six ==
=== TD42 ===
The TD42 has been in production since July 1987. It displaces 4,169 cc (254.4 cu in); it's a square engine and the bore and stroke are 96 mm × 96 mm (3.78 in × 3.78 in). Its fuel-injection pump is mechanically controlled. Early models have a silver cylinder head cover ("Silvertop"), while turbocharged TD42s and naturally aspirated ones built after 1995 are black ("Blacktop"). Since 1988, Nissan Diesel Industrial Engines also manufactured this model for use in forklifts; the company building these (and the industrial versions of the TD25/TD27) changed name to Nissan Industrial Engine Manufacturing (NIEM) in 1995 and became Global Component Technologies (GCT) in 2015. This low output version produces 61 kW (83 PS) at 2,400 rpm and was still in production as of 2024. Old-fashioned but beloved for its ruggedness and reliability, the TD42 is not particularly fuel efficient and may be subject to cooling issues when not properly maintained.

The naturally aspirated versions of the TD42 produce from 115 to 135 PS (85 to 99 kW; 113 to 133 bhp) depending on market, fitment, and measuring methods. It has been installed in the Nissan Civilian series (W40, W41) since 1988 and the Nissan Safari/Patrol (Y60/61). Original engines (until 1996) were fitted with 28 mm gudgeon pins whilst from 08/1996 onwards, Nissan fitted 30 mm pins. The rear seal also changed from a conventional style to a unitized style around September 1997.

=== TD42T ===
The TD42T is the turbocharged version of the aforementioned TD42. It was available from 1993. Nissan revised the crankshaft design as well as the piston design to accommodate the turbocharging. Extended oil squirters and oil cooling for the pistons were added. The fuel pumps were upgraded to an 11 mm plunger style on these models to allow more fuel flow.

=== TD42Ti ===
These engines have been fitted with a factory intercooler and were built from the end of 2002 to 2007. In February 2003, this version received electronic control of injection timing; this increased the torque output to 360 N⋅m (37 kg⋅m; 266 lb⋅ft). The electronic control version was called the TD42ETi by Nissan. Power outputs of the turbocharged models range from 145 to 160 PS (107 to 118 kW; 143 to 158 bhp) depending on fitment, model, and market. These are the most sought after model of the TD42 family, having the strongest internals and being factory intercooled. Still highly valued due to their simplicity and reliability, the TD42 family has a strong following in the overlanding and offroading markets. Aftermarket support is extensive for the TD42 with many options available both in OEM and performance applications. Nissan ended production in 2007 due to incoming emissions restrictions; in most applications it was replaced by the ZD30 family.

== See also ==
- List of Nissan engines
