= Nissan QD engine =

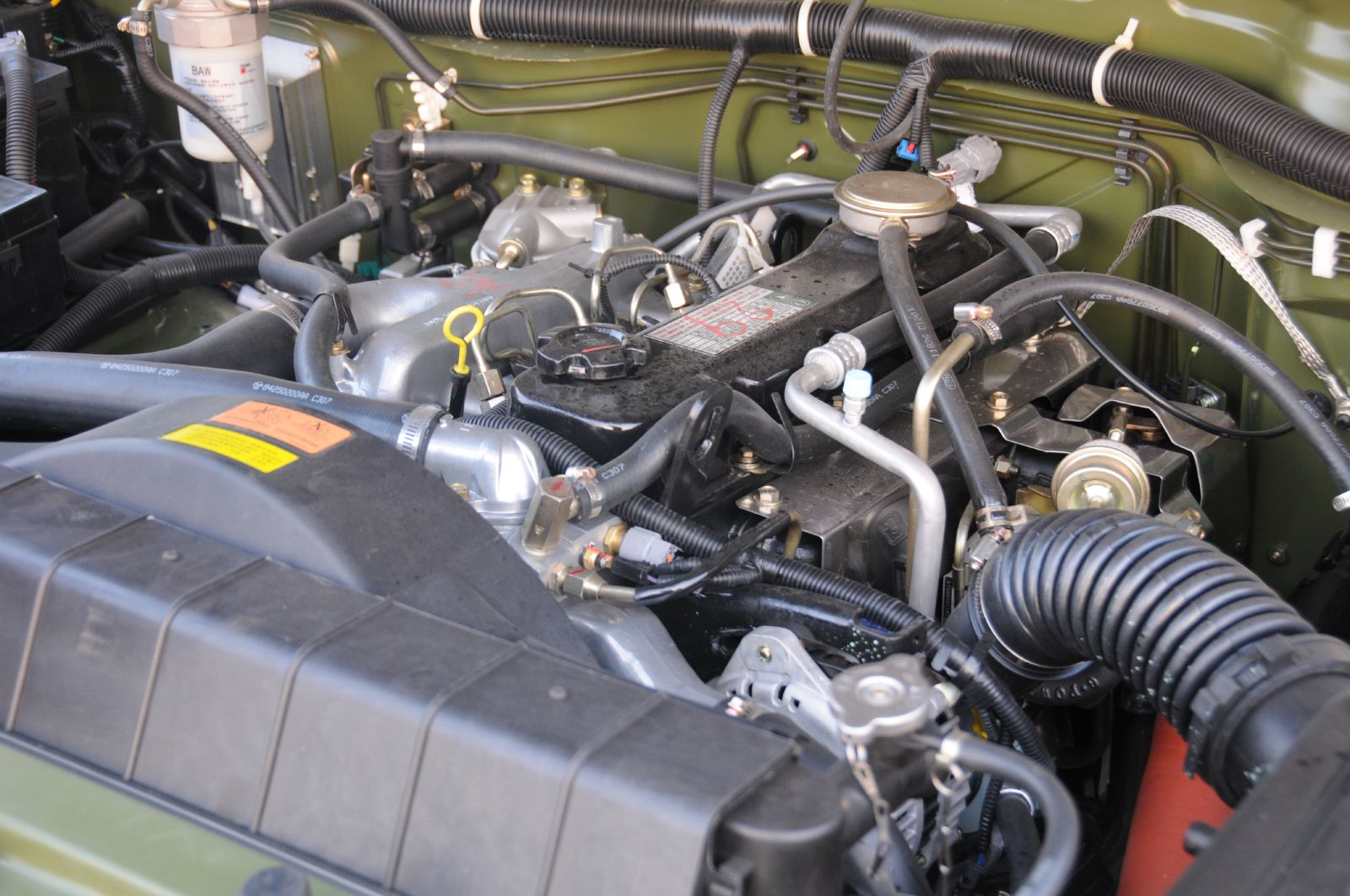
- QD engine in a Beijing BJ2022JC

Overview
- Manufacturer: Nissan Diesel

Layout
- Configuration: Straight-four
- Displacement: 3.2 L (3,153 cc)
- Cylinder bore: 99.2 mm (3.91 in)
- Piston stroke: 102 mm (4.02 in)

Combustion
- Turbocharger: Only on the QD32ETi
- Fuel system: Fuel injection
- Fuel type: Diesel
- Cooling system: Water-cooled

Output
- Power output: 147 PS (108 kW; 145 bhp)
- Torque output: 21.3–34 kg⋅m (209–333 N⋅m; 154–246 lb⋅ft)

Chronology
- Predecessor: Nissan TD engine
- Successor: Nissan ZD engine

The Nissan QD engine, successor to the Nissan TD engine, was an inline four-cylinder overhead valve diesel produced from the mid-1990s through 2000, with a turbocharger used on three variants, the QD32ETi(Elgrand and Terrano) QD32T and Qd32Ti (intercooled) in Chinese Markets (Nissan Cabstar) . It was replaced by the Nissan ZD engine.

== QD32 ==
3.2 L (3,153 cc)

=== QD321 ===
100 PS (74 kW; 99 bhp) at 3600 rpm
22.5 kg⋅m (221 N⋅m; 163 lb⋅ft) at 2000 rpm
Nissan Homy / Nissan Caravan (E24) 1996–2001 (Automatic transmission)

=== QD35 ===
100 PS (74 kW; 99 bhp) at 3800 rpm
21.3 kg⋅m (209 N⋅m; 154 lb⋅ft) at 2000 rpm
Nissan Homy / Nissan Caravan (E24) 1996–2001 (Manual transmission)

=== QD323 ===
105 PS (77 kW; 104 bhp) at 3900 rpm
22.5 kg⋅m (221 N⋅m; 163 lb⋅ft) at 2000 rpm
Datsun Truck (D22) 1997–2002

=== QD324 ===
105 PS (77 kW; 104 bhp) at 3600 rpm
22.5 kg⋅m (221 N⋅m; 163 lb⋅ft) at 2000 rpm
Nissan Atlas (F23) 1997–2004

=== QD325 ===
98 PS (72 kW; 97 bhp) at 3000 rpm
22 kg⋅m (220 N⋅m; 160 lb⋅ft) at 2000 rpm
Nissan Atlas (F23) 2004–2007

=== QD32ETi ===
150 PS (110 kW; 148 bhp) at 3600 rpm
34 kg⋅m (330 N⋅m; 250 lb⋅ft) at 2000 rpm

Nissan Terrano (Rpm System) 1996–1999
Nissan Elgrand (E50) 1997–1999

== CYQD29Ti ==
Chinese Foton Motor (and other manufacturers) also builds a version of the QD32 with the later ZD30 engine's 96 mm (3.8 in) bore, for a displacement of 2,953 cc (180.2 cu in), but without the ZD's direct injection system.

== See also ==
- List of Nissan engines
