= Nissan Terrano II =

Nissan Terrano II (R20)
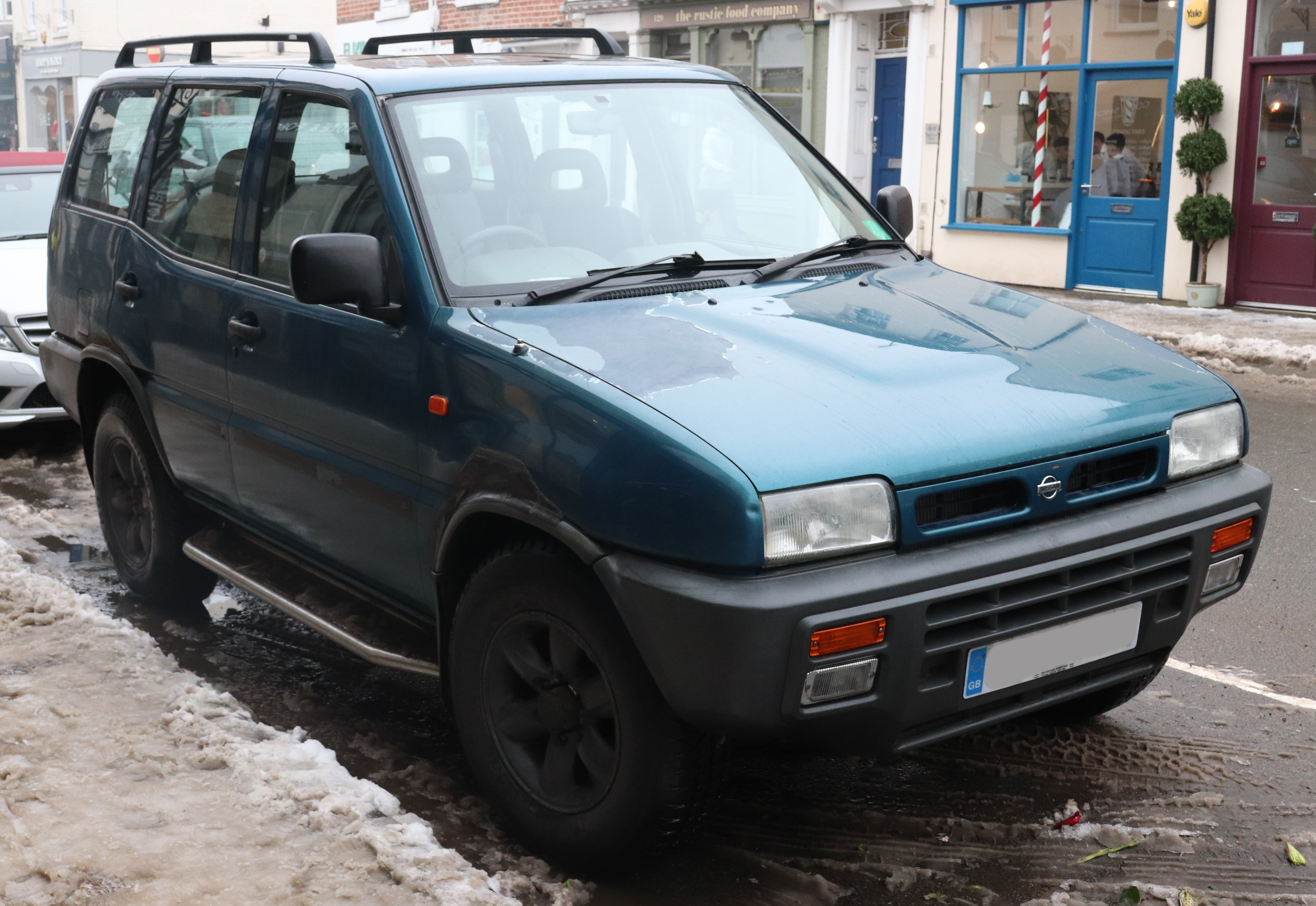
- Nissan Terrano II (pre-facelift)

Overview
- Manufacturer: Nissan
- Also called: Nissan Mistral (Japan, 1994–1998); Nissan Terrano (Europe, 2002–2005); Ford Maverick (Europe, 1993-1999)
- Production: 1993–2005
- Assembly: Spain: Barcelona (Nissan Motor Ibérica)
- Designer: Ercole Spada at I.DE.A Institute

Body and chassis
- Class: Compact SUV
- Body style: 3/5-door SUV
- Layout: Longitudinal Front-engine, four-wheel-drive
- Chassis: Body-on-frame
- Related: Nissan Terrano (WD21)

Powertrain
- Engine: Petrol: 2.4 L KA24S/KA24E I4; Diesel: 2.7 L TD27Ti/TD27ETi turbo I4; 3.0 L ZD30DDTi turbo I4
- Transmission: 5-speed manual 4-speed automatic

Dimensions
- Wheelbase: 3-door: 2,450 mm (96.5 in); 5-door: 2,650 mm (104.3 in)
- Length: 3-door, 2000–2007: 4,215–4,250 mm (165.9–167.3 in); 5-door, 2000–2007: 4,695–4,730 mm (184.8–186.2 in); 3-door, 1993–2000: 4,105–4,185 mm (161.6–164.8 in); 5-door, 1993–2000: 4,585–4,665 mm (180.5–183.7 in)
- Width: 1,755 mm (69.1 in)
- Height: 1,805 mm (71.1 in)
- Curb weight: 1,760–1,920 kg (3,880–4,233 lb)

Chronology
- Successor: For Nissan Terrano II/Mistral: Nissan Qashqai; Nissan X-Trail; Nissan Pathfinder; For Ford Maverick: Ford Escape

The Nissan Terrano II (known as the Nissan Mistral (Japanese: 日産・ミストラル, Hepburn: Nissan Misutoraru) in Japan) is a compact SUV manufactured by the Japanese automaker Nissan from 1993 to 2005. It was also made by Nissan's Spanish subsidiary Nissan Motor Ibérica S.A. for the European market, where it was marketed as the Terrano II, and also supplied under an OEM agreement to Ford Europe for sale as the Ford Maverick on the continent and in the United Kingdom.

The name "Mistral" is derived from the local wind that blows in the southeastern part of France.

== Overview ==
First launched in 1993, out of production in May 2005 and with sales finally terminated in 2006, the model enjoyed long market life in just one generation. The basic form was unchanged, albeit with significant updates throughout its lifetime. Nissan's internal designation for this model was R20. It was also exported to Japan, where it was called the Mistral and sold exclusively via the Japanese Nissan dealership network called Nissan Satio Store.

The Terrano II/Mistral's body was designed by the Italian I.DE.A Institute. It was tall and slim compared to most competitors, and provided for ample ground clearance. It was based on the WD21 series Terrano platform, and came in two body styles differing in wheelbase – a shorter three-door and a longer five-door model. Chiefly for the British market, a panel van version of the three-door was also made.

Production of the Terrano II started in Spain in February 1993, and it went on sale in Europe in May that year. The Mistral was launched in Japan in June 1994. At first available in the five-door version only, a three-door Mistral joined in 1995.

In 1996, the car was facelifted, gaining round headlights. In Australia, the Terrano II arrived late to the market, going on sale in April 1997. It was available only with a manual transmission; the lack of an automatic option limited its sales potential in that market.

In the beginning of 1999, both the JDM model of the Mistral and the Ford Maverick were phased out, while the remaining Terrano II was facelifted again, gaining an updated front fascia more in-line with contemporary Nissans, as well as an updated interior.

In 2002, yet another facelift took place, giving the model the steering wheel from the P12 series Primera. Presented in March, at the 72nd Geneva Motor Show, the model was hence marketed as simply "Nissan Terrano" in Europe, the previous Terrano being marketed as Pathfinder.

The Terrano was sold in Europe until 2006. It was replaced indirectly by three different models; the X-Trail (which had been sold alongside it since 2001), the Pathfinder, and the UK-built Qashqai.

While the Terrano II had three or five doors and a body-on-frame platform, the Qashqai only comes with five doors and a unibody platform.

== Engines ==
The Terrano II had 2.4 L petrol KA24S and 2.7 L turbo-diesel engines at its launch in 1993; from 1996 the petrol engine became fuel-injected (KA24E) and the diesel became intercooled, with 2.4i and 2.7 TDi replacing the previous models.

From 1999 until 2006, a 3.0 L TDi DOHC, direct injected, turbo-diesel intercooled engine was produced, using a version of the ZD engine, the ZD30DDTi, that has also seen service in the bigger and heavier Patrol. In the Terrano II, the 3.0 L TDi engine provides much more power and fuel efficiency than the 2.7 TD engines.

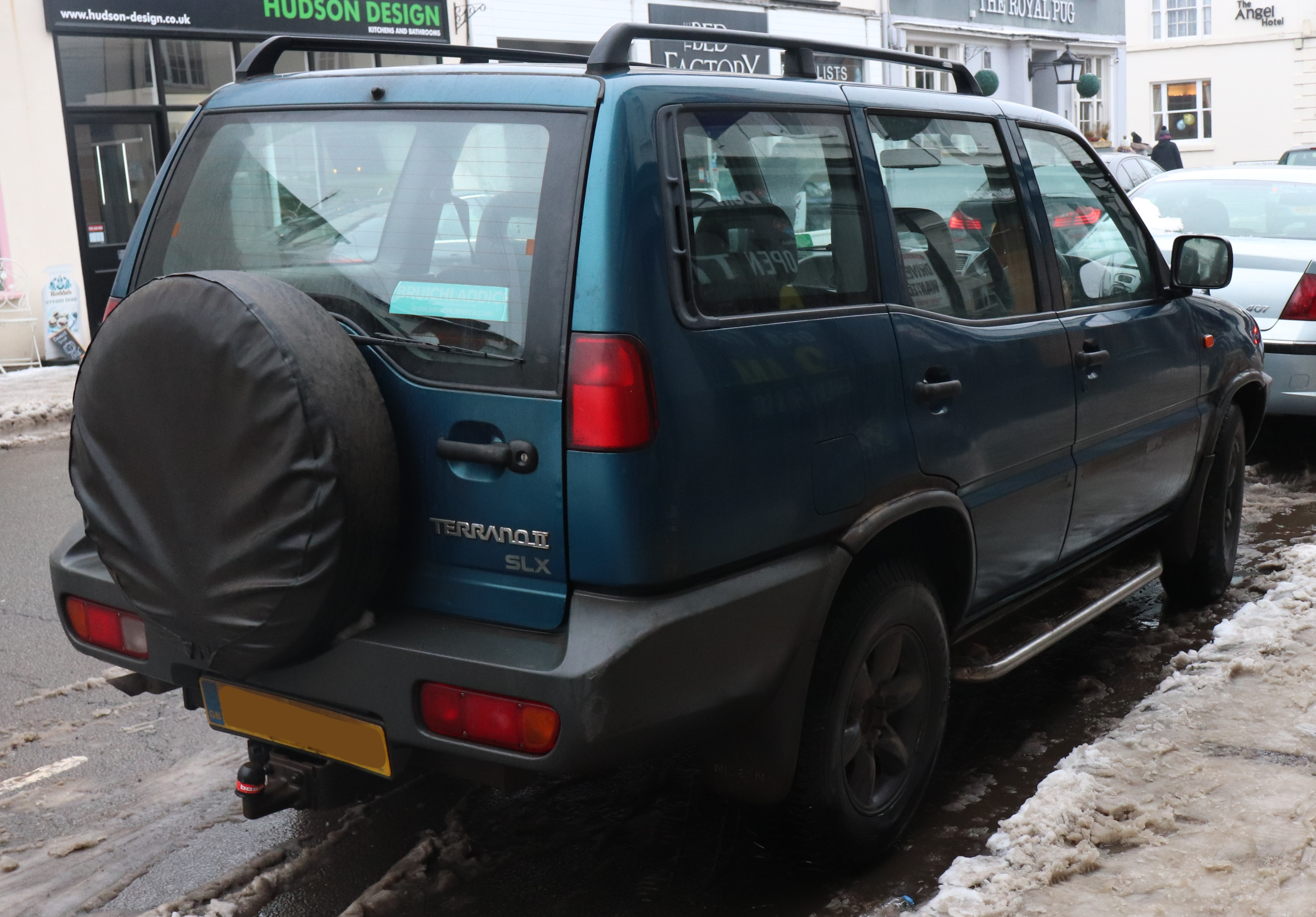
Rear view (pre-facelift)

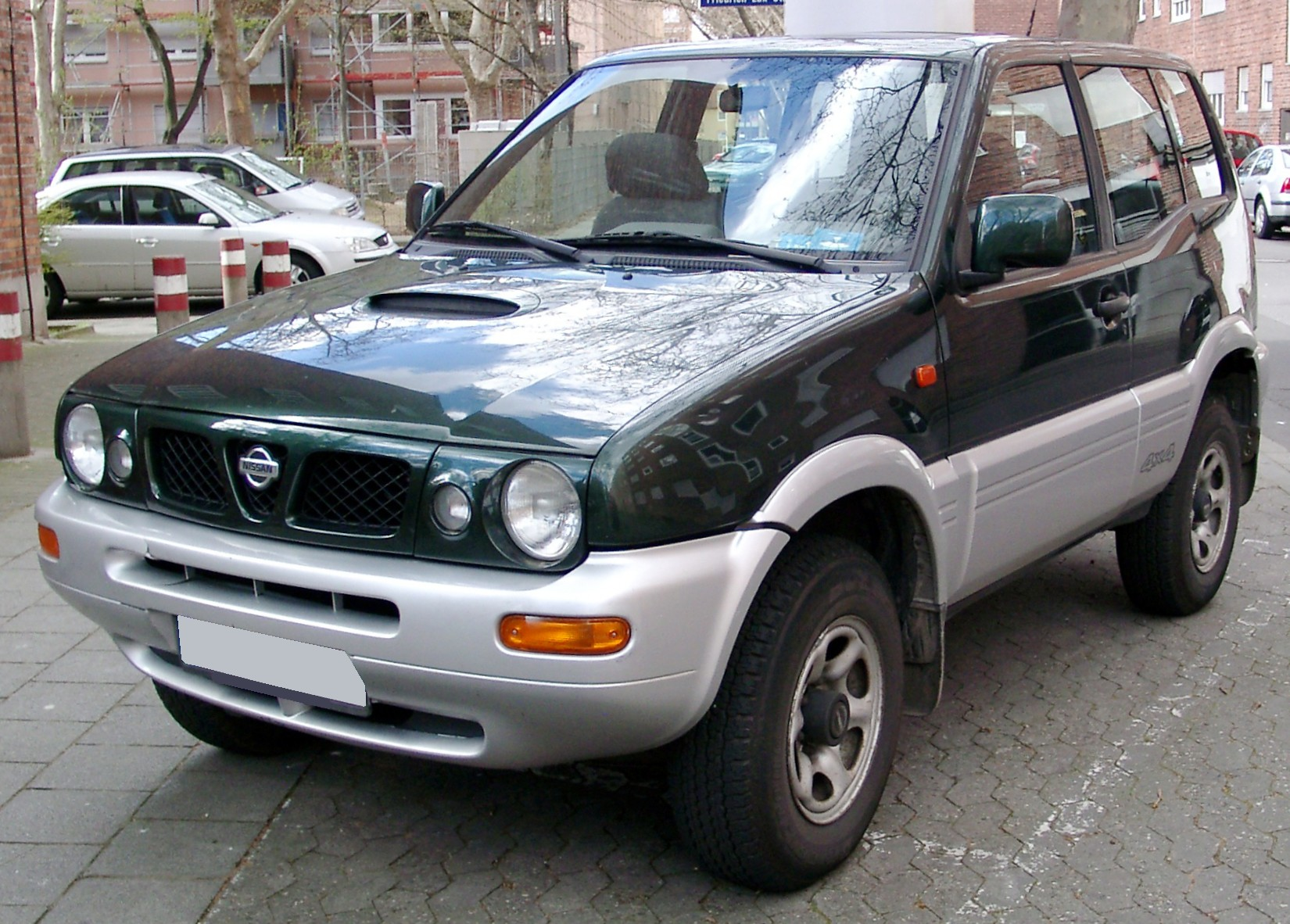
First facelift, note the round headlights

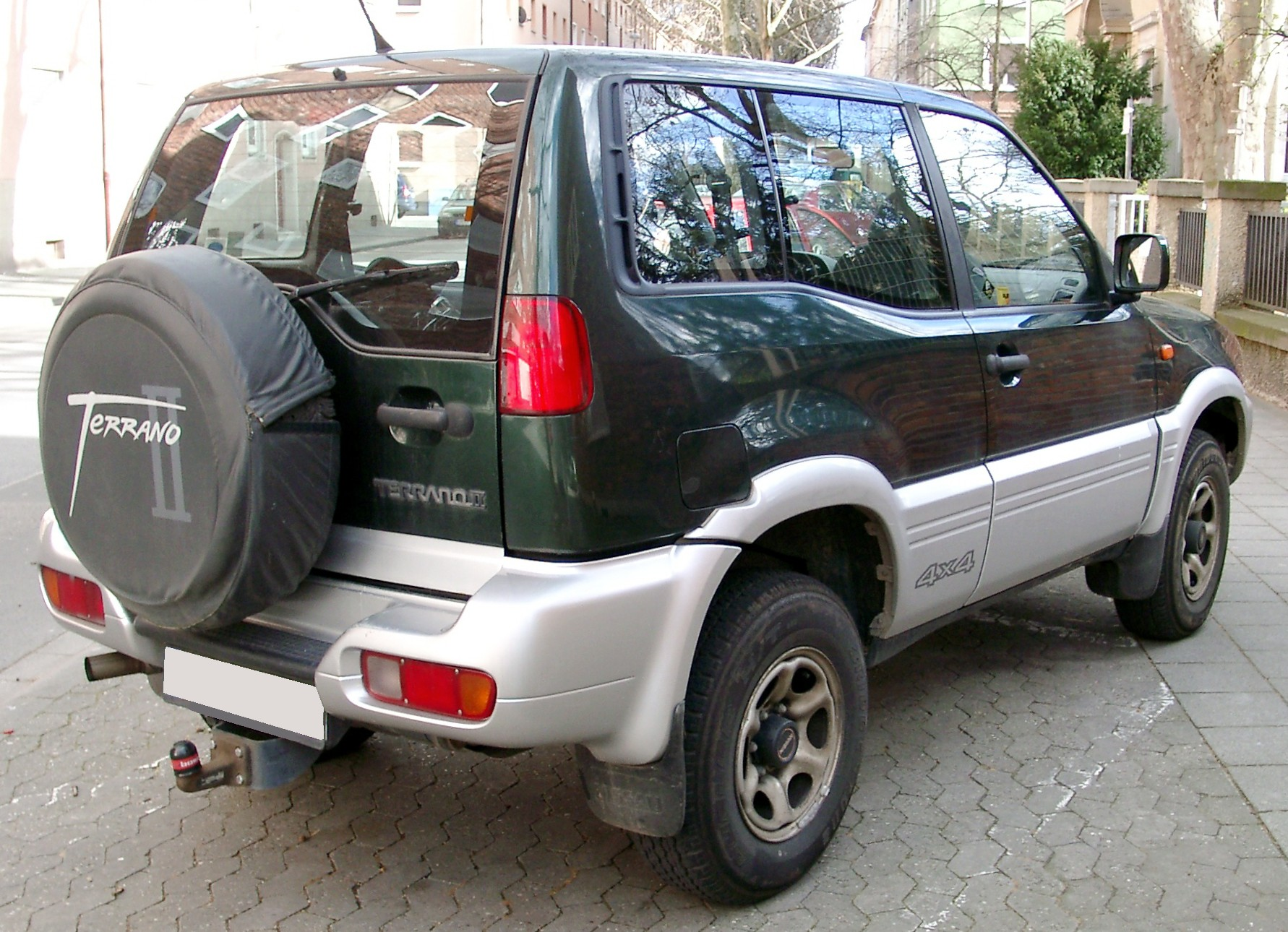
First facelift

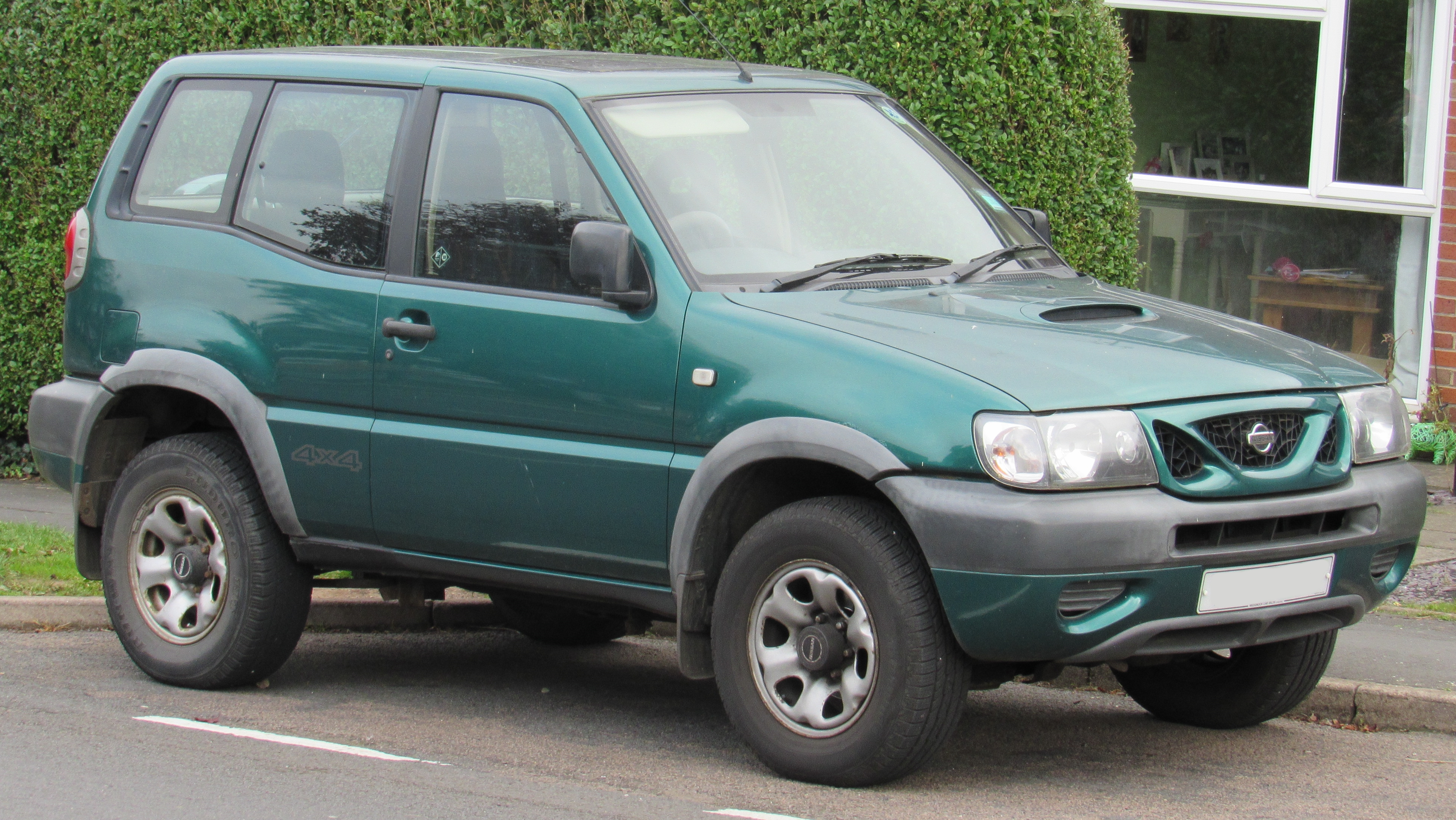
Second facelift with revised fascia and headlights

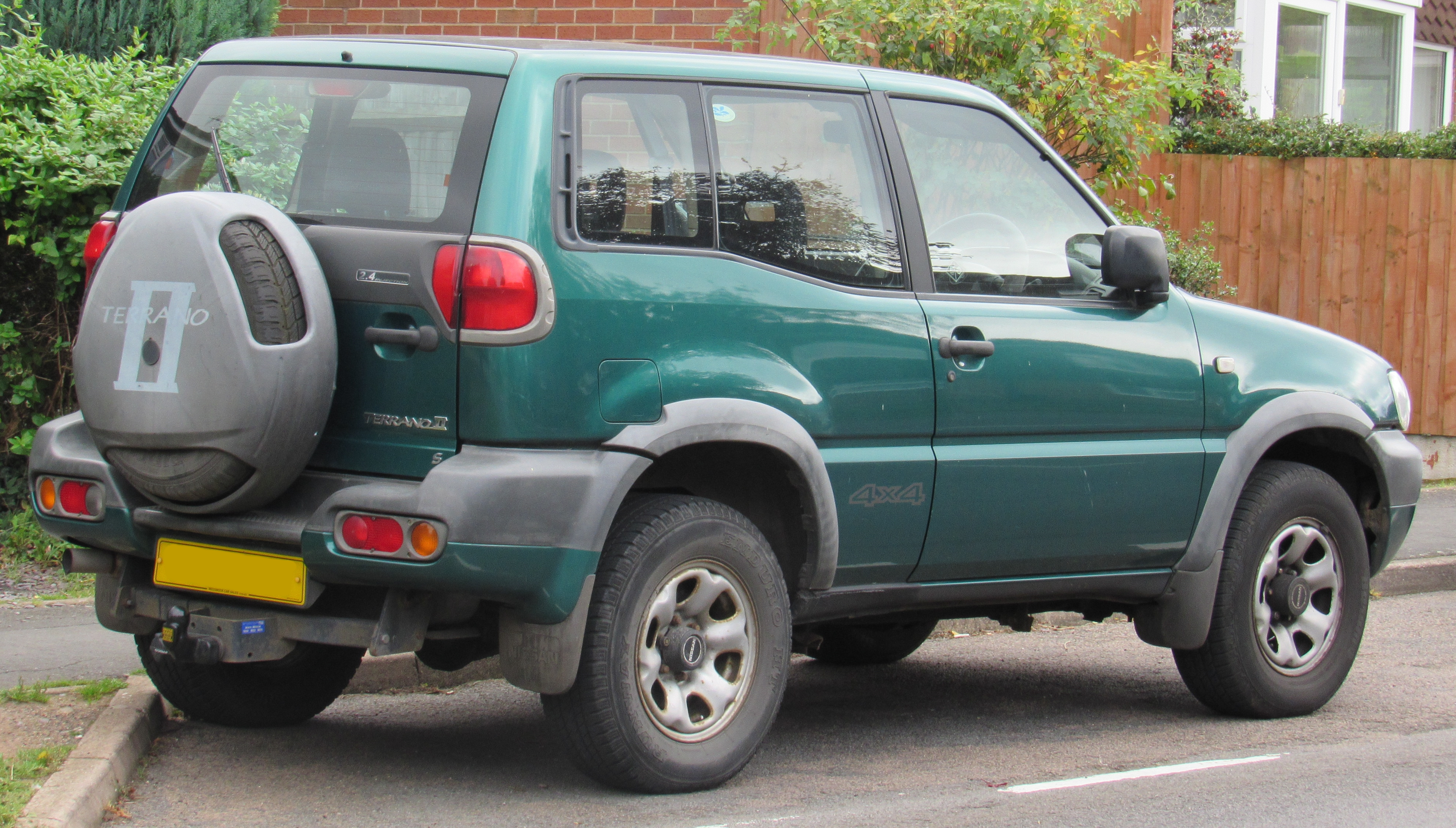
Second facelift

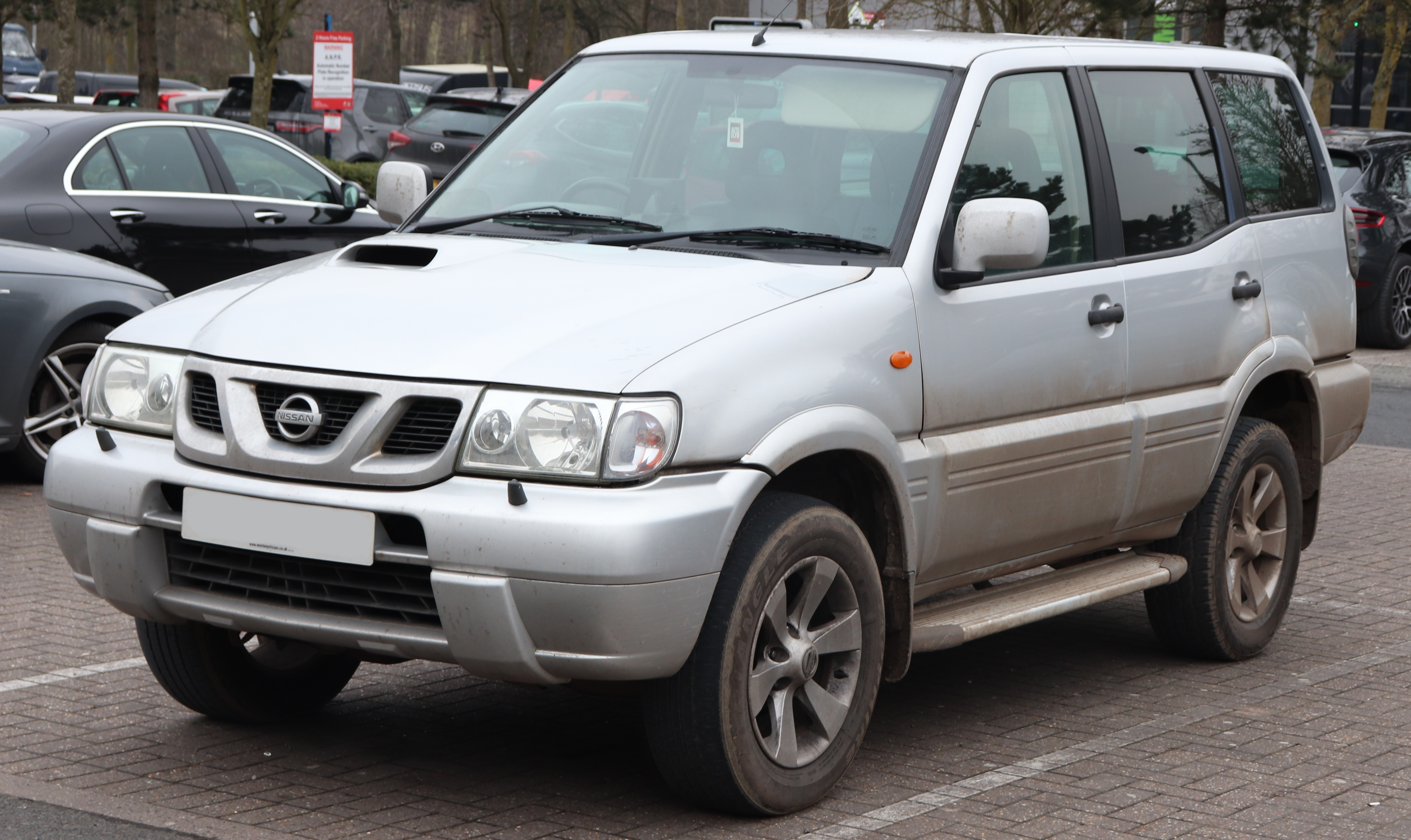
Third facelift (revised fascia)

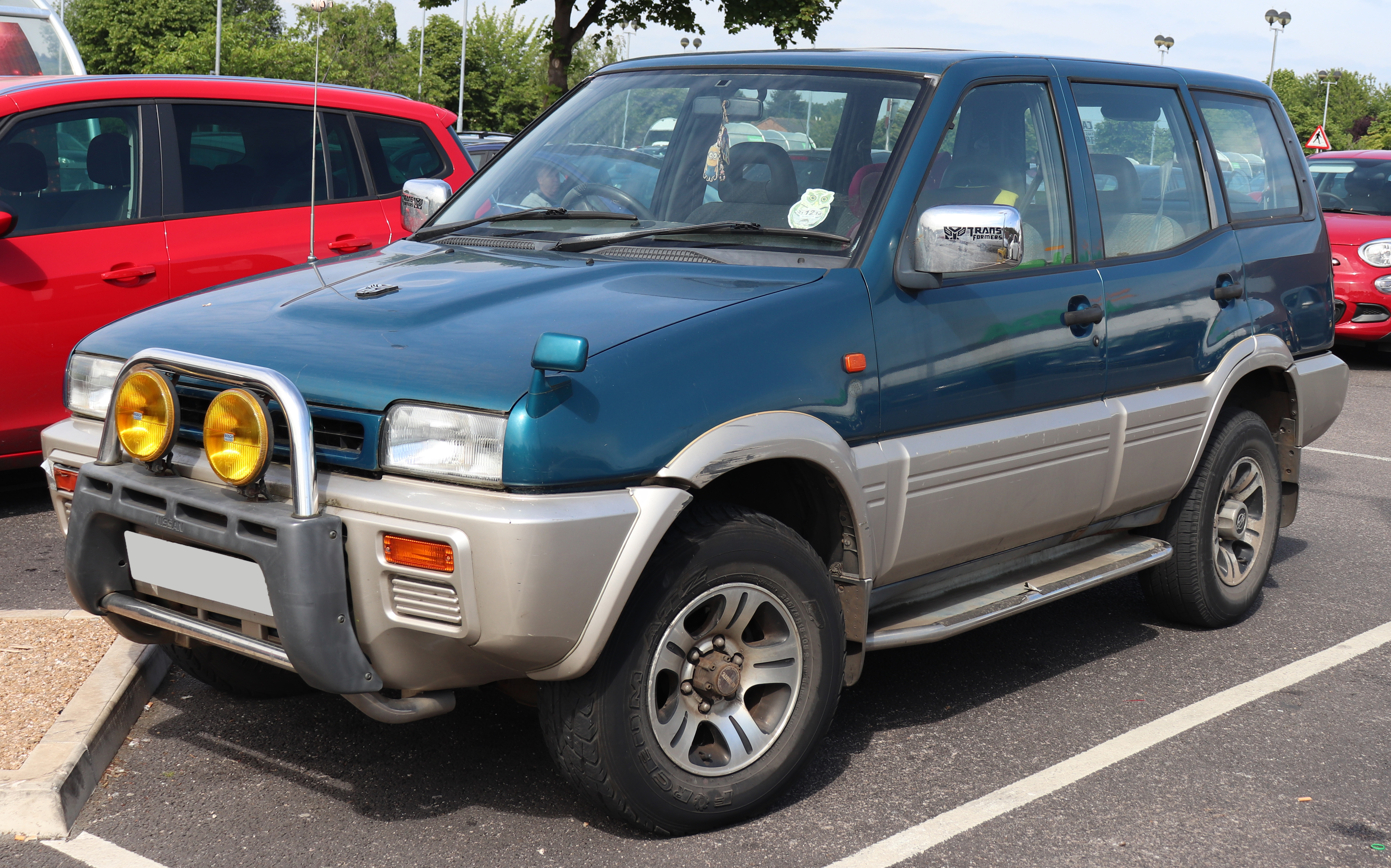
Nissan Mistral LWB

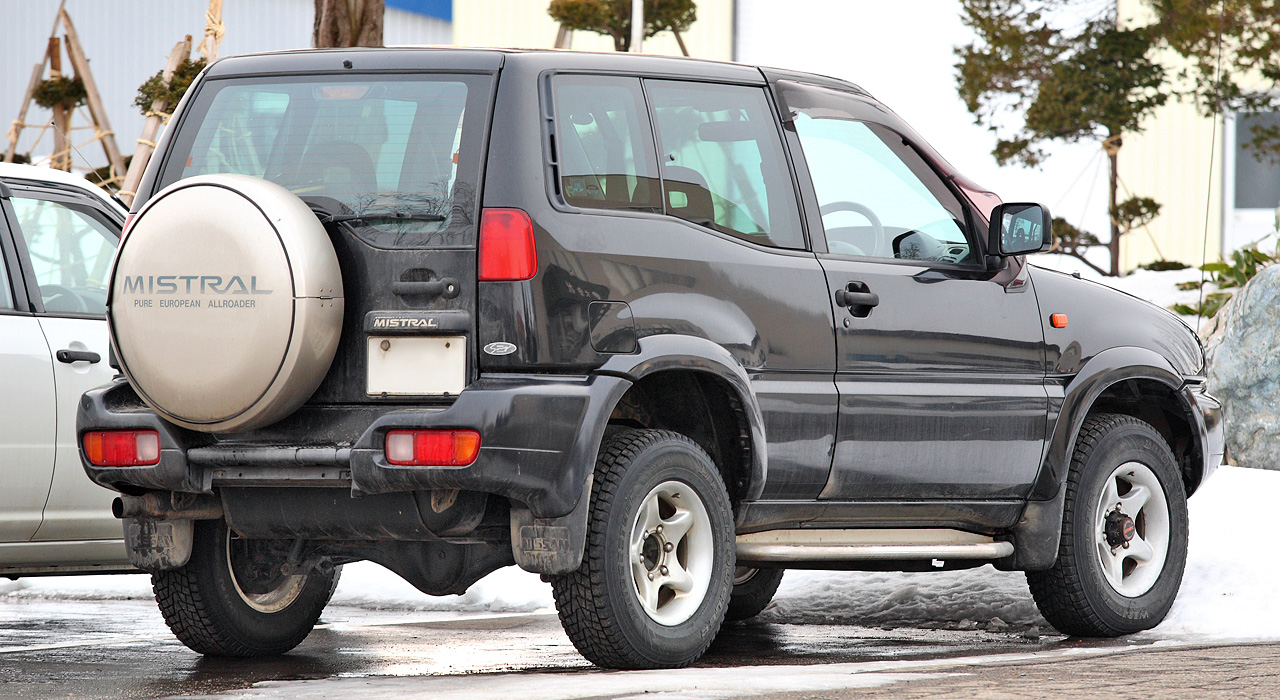
Nissan Mistral SWB

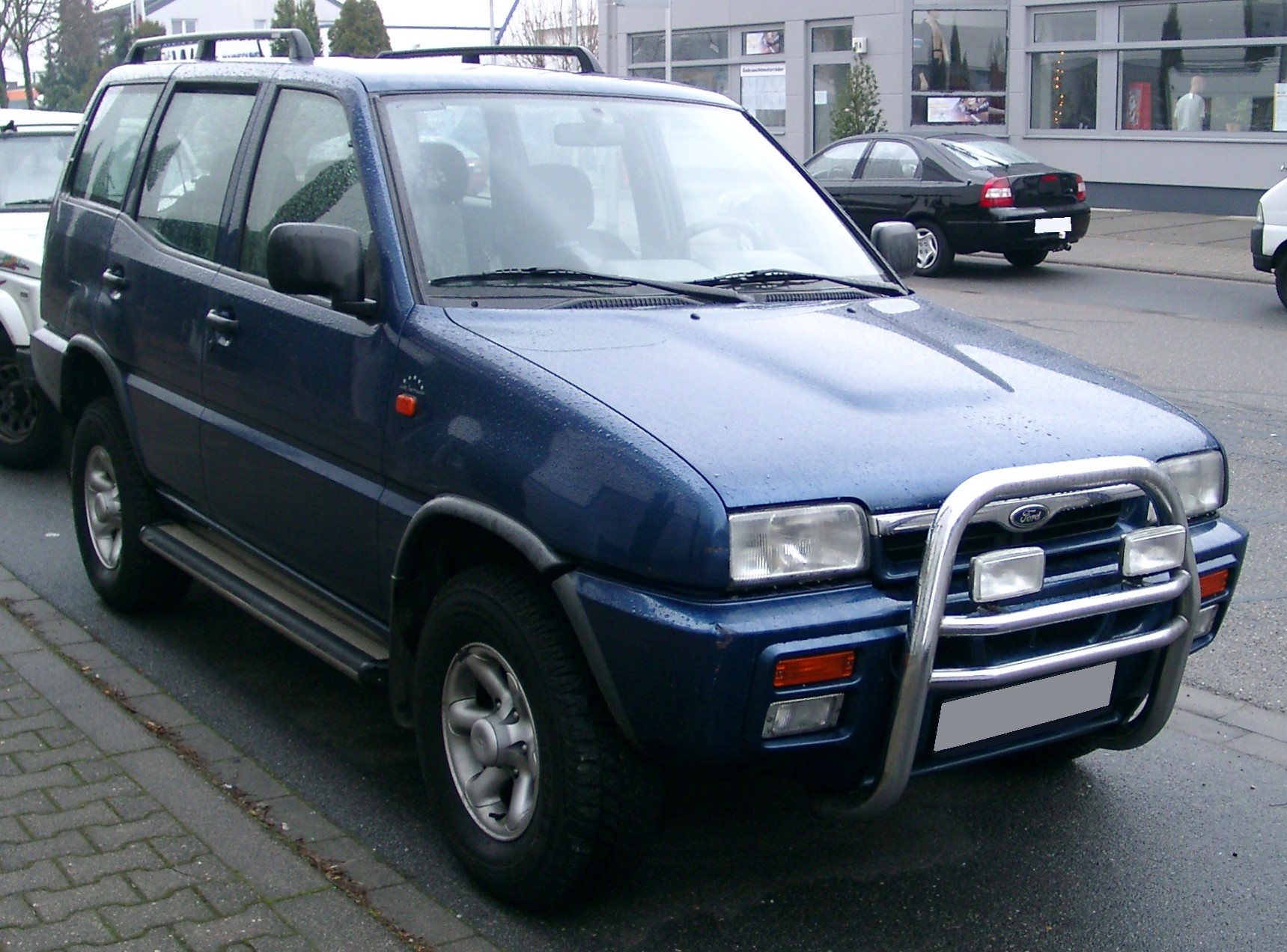
Ford Maverick
