= Nissan Motor Ibérica =

Spanish subsidiary company

Nissan Motor Ibérica S.A.
- Company type: Subsidiary
- Industry: Automotive
- Founded: 1980
- Headquarters: Barcelona, Spain
- Key people: Marco Toro (managing director)
- Products: Automobiles; Engines
- Parent: Nissan
- Website: www.nissan.es

Nissan Motor Ibérica S.A. is the Spanish arm of Japanese automaker Nissan that specializes in the sales and distribution of Nissan automobiles in Spain. Until 2021, it also manufactured automobiles and engines. NMI's headquarters are based in the Zona Franca industrial area of the Catalan city of Barcelona. Another of the company's assembly plants is located in Ávila in the Castile and León region. Parts are produced in Montcada i Reixac in the province of Barcelona and manufactured in Los Corrales de Buelna, Cantabria. As of 2010, the number of employees at Nissan Motor Ibérica was 5200. Production was 132,149 vehicles in the record year of 2008. Nissan uses the acronym NMISA for the company.

In May 2020, as part of a global restructuring plan, Nissan announced the closure of its manufacturing operations in Barcelona, resulting in the loss of about 3,000 jobs. The Spanish government estimated that the plant's closure could cost Nissan more than €1 billion ($1.10 billion). The three Barcelona factories (Zona Franca assembly and engine plant, Montcada i Reixac stamping plant, and Sant Andreu de la Barca rack and suspension plant) closed at the end of December 2021. The last vehicle (a D23 Nissan Navara) was produced the 16th of December, 2021. 3,345,000 vehicles had been produced there.

In 2024, Chery signed an agreement with Ebro-EV Motos to reopen the Barcelona plant for production of their Omoda 5 and Jaecoo 7 models. According to unnamed sources cited by Bloomberg, production is to start in October 2025, with 1,000 jobs returning.

== Assembly plants ==
=== Barcelona ===
- Nissan Almera Tino
- Nissan Patrol 160/260, Y60, Y61 from 1983 to 2001 (196,000 vehicles produced)
- Nissan Vanette
- Nissan Serena/Nissan Vanette Cargo/LDV Cub C23
- Nissan Terrano II from 1993 to 2005 (375,000 vehicles produced)/Ford Maverick
- Nissan Primastar/Renault Trafic/Opel/Vauxhall Vivaro A from 2002 to 2014 (732,000 vehicles produced)
- Nissan Navara D40
- Nissan Pathfinder R51
- Nissan NV200 from 2009 to 2019 and e-NV200 from 2014 to 2021 (49,000 e-NV200 produced)
- Nissan Pulsar C13 from 2014 to 2018
- Nissan Navara D23 from July 2015 to December 2021/Renault Alaskan/Mercedes X-Class

=== Ávila ===
- Nissan Atleon
- Nissan Cabstar/Renault Trucks Maxity
- Nissan Trade
