= Rielo =

Rielo is a Spanish surname. Notable people with the surname include:

- Fernando Rielo (1923–2004), Spanish Catholic Servant of God
- José Manuel Rielo (born 1946), Spanish footballer and manager
