= Tumble flap =

Engine component

A tumble flap is a flap housed in the intake area of many modern automotive gasoline engines to produce a swirl at right-angles to the cylinder axis. This swirling motion improves the air-fuel mixture and enhances power and torque, while at the same time lowering fuel consumption and decreasing emissions. The flaps can be actuated with pneumatic or electric power. Furthermore, the position of the flap can be controlled continuously with a feedback controller or just kept either fully closed or open. Use of a tumble flap improves the lean burn ability of a spark-ignition engine.

== Operation ==
The set point of the tumble flap is adjusted by an electrical or vacuum-activated servo mechanism which is under the control of the engine management system. Tumble flaps are open or closed depending on engine operating states (related to engine speed and load), engine temperatures, combustion modes (characterized by air-fuel ratio), catalytic converter heating or cold start active or inactive etc.

In gasoline direct injection, stratified charge mode is used for light-load running conditions, at constant or reducing road speeds, where no acceleration is required. In this charge mode, the air-fuel mixture is concentrated around the spark plug by means of the specifically produced air flow and a special geometry of the piston, while pure air is placed near the cylinder walls. Tumble flaps are used to realize this stratified charge. The flaps remain closed during the stratified charge mode. A switchable tumble system is normally used to direct a targeted air flow. The so-called "tumble plate" divides the air inlet channel into an upper and lower half. An upstream flap allows air flow either only over the upper part or over the entire cross-section.

At higher engine speeds and torques, the tumble flap is opened to achieve a better degree of filling. During this homogeneous mode of combustion, the engine functions like a conventional fuel injection engine, but with higher efficiency due to the higher compression.

The tumble flaps are also actuated to improve cold engine idling. During scavenging the flaps are opened in order to draw much fresh air into the cylinder.

== See also ==
- Swirl flap
