= Swirl flap =

Combustion engine component

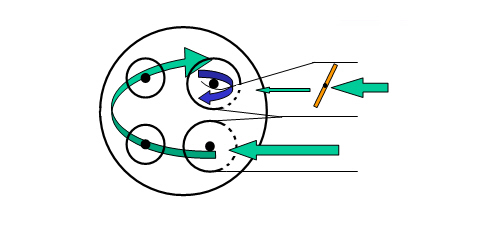
Swirl flap principle in a four-valve engine

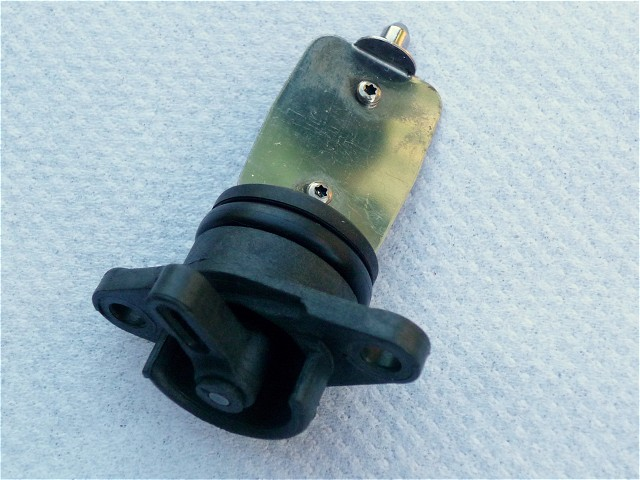

A swirl flap is a small butterfly valve fitted to four-stroke internal combustion engines with at least two intake valves. It is installed inside or just before one of a cylinder's two intake ports, allowing to throttle its intake port's air flow, causing a swirl in the other intake port not fitted with a swirl flap. The swirl improves the air-fuel mixing process in direct injected engines, typically diesel engines, under low load conditions.

== Operation ==
Swirl flap position is adjusted by an electrical or vacuum-actuated servo mechanism which is under the control of the engine management system. In a typical implementation the flaps will be closed at idle speed, creating additional turbulence in the intake. As engine speed increases, the flaps are gradually opened until, at around 2,000/min, they are parallel to the airflow and present virtually no resistance. Their purpose is to ensure that the air entering the cylinder is sufficiently turbulent for good fuel-air mixing even at low engine speeds. This aids in reducing emissions and may also improve low-end torque.

== Disadvantages ==
The disadvantages of swirl flaps are mainly associated with fouling by exhaust gas recirculation, which leaves tarry deposits on the flaps and the inside of the intake manifold. Over time the flaps can begin to stick in one position and the engine management system may report an error code if the correct flap position cannot be achieved within a few percent of the design specification.

== See also ==
- Tumble flap
