= Nissan Atleon =

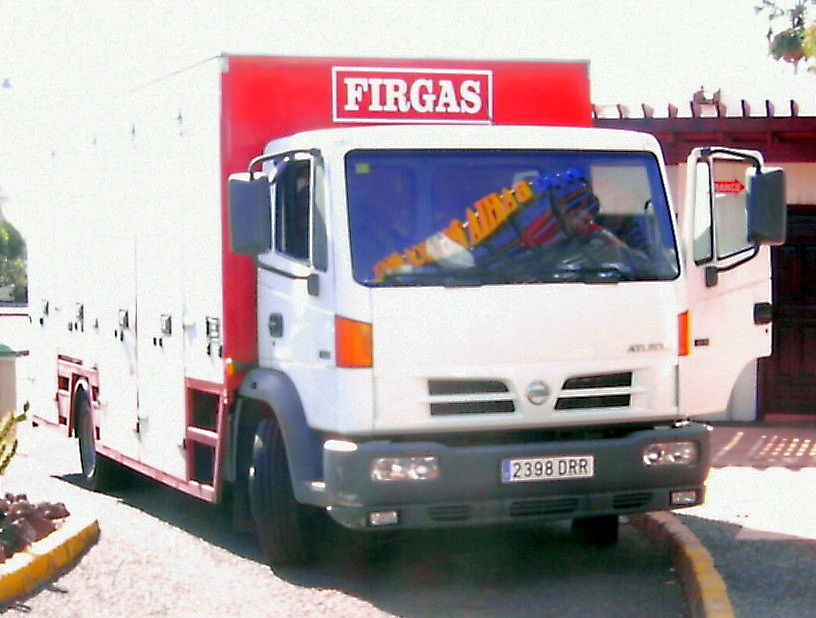

Overview
- Manufacturer: Ebro (1980–1987); Nissan
- Also called: Ebro L/M-Series (1980–1987); Nissan Ebro L/M-Series (1987–1990); Nissan L/M-Series (1990–2000); Nissan Camiones ECO-T (1997–2000)
- Production: 1980–2013

Body and chassis
- Class: Truck

Chronology
- Predecessor: Ebro P-Series
- Successor: Nissan NT500

The Nissan Atleon is a truck produced by the Japanese automobile company Nissan and was distributed through European dealer networks.

== L/M-Series (1980–2000) ==
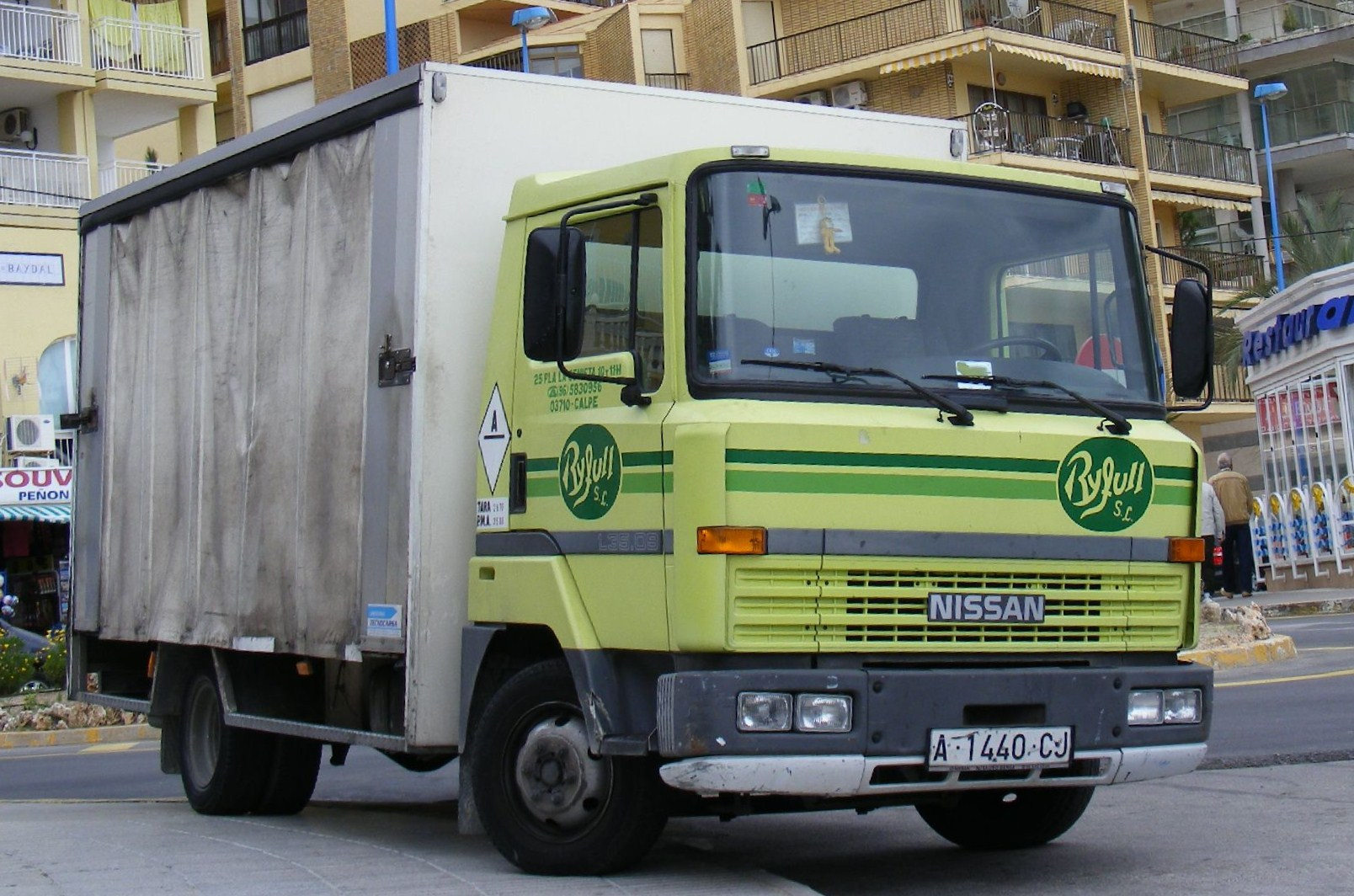
Nissan L-Series

Nissan acquired a stake in the Spanish car manufacturer Ebro in 1980 and acquired it entirely in 1987. The models produced by Ebro gradually became Nissan models. They just launched Ebro L / M series, which replaced the Ebro P-Series was also sold as Ebro as was the Ebro F-Series. After the takeover in 1987, the Ebro F-series became the Nissan Ebro Trade and later the Nissan Trade. Also in 1987, the Ebro L / M series became the Nissan Ebro L / M series. From 1990 the name Ebro ceased to exist and the Nissan L / M series was built until 2000. The L / M series was gradually offered in all European countries from 1990, with the market launch in Germany taking place in 1995.

== ECO-T (Atleon) (1997–2000) ==
From 1997 there was a revised model of the L / M series that was sold in many markets (such as Germany) as the Nissan ECO-T or Nissan Camiones ECO-T (Spain) and in some markets with the addition Atleon. The model name is called Nissan ECO-T / Nissan Camiones ECO-T or Nissan ECO-T Atleon / Nissan Camiones ECO-T Atleon. Only with the model built from 2000 onwards was the name Atleon introduced in all markets.

== Nissan Atleon (2000–2013) ==
From September 2000, until 2013 the Atleon was built in the Barcelona plant by Nissan Motor Ibérica. It was available ex works as chassis, flatbed truck or with box body. The smallest version with a total weight of 3.5 tons was created in order to be able to drive it with a Class B driving license. It was initially delivered with the Nissan type B660TiL, type B660TiH and type B440Ti turbo diesel engines, all of which had direct injection.

In 2006 there was a facelift. The front was adapted to the Nissan Cabstar F24. Since then, the Nissan ZD30 with 110 kW at 3400 / min and the Cummins ISB5-4H - 136 kW at 2500 / min have had new diesel engines with common rail combined with one six-speed manual transmission. In mid-2013, the Atleon was replaced by the Nissan NT500.
