= Exhaust gas recirculation =

NOx reduction technique used in gasoline and diesel engines

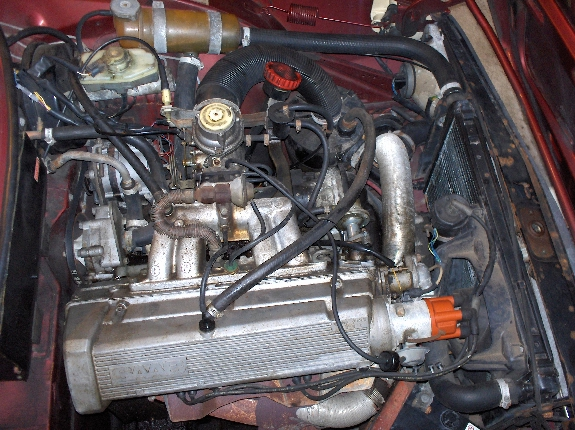
EGR valve the top of box on top of the inlet manifold of a Saab H engine in a 1987 Saab 90

In internal combustion engines, exhaust gas recirculation (EGR) is a nitrogen oxide (NO_{x}) emissions reduction technique used in petrol/gasoline, diesel engines and some hydrogen engines. EGR works by recirculating a portion of an engine's exhaust gas back to the engine cylinders. The exhaust gas displaces atmospheric air and reduces O_{2} in the combustion chamber. Reducing the amount of oxygen reduces the amount of fuel that can burn in the cylinder thereby reducing peak in-cylinder temperatures. The actual amount of recirculated exhaust gas varies with the engine operating parameters.

In the combustion cylinder, NO_{x} is produced by high-temperature mixtures of atmospheric nitrogen and oxygen, and this usually occurs at cylinder peak pressure. In a spark-ignition engine, an ancillary benefit of recirculating exhaust gases via an external EGR valve is an increase in efficiency, as charge dilution allows a larger throttle position and reduces associated pumping losses.

In a gasoline engine, this inert exhaust displaces some amount of combustible charge in the cylinder, effectively reducing the quantity of charge available for combustion without affecting the air–fuel ratio. In a diesel engine, the exhaust gas replaces some of the excess oxygen in the pre-combustion mixture. Because NO_{x} forms primarily when a mixture of nitrogen and oxygen is subjected to high temperature, the lower combustion chamber temperatures caused by EGR reduces the amount of NO_{x} that the combustion process generates. Gases re-introduced from EGR systems will also contain near equilibrium concentrations of NO_{x} and CO; the small fraction initially within the combustion chamber inhibits the total net production of these and other pollutants when sampled on a time average. Chemical properties of different fuels limit how much EGR may be used. For example methanol is more tolerant to EGR than gasoline.

== History ==
The first EGR systems were crude; some were as simple as an orifice jet between the exhaust and intake tracts which admitted exhaust to the intake tract whenever the engine was running. Difficult starting, rough idling, reduced performance and lost fuel economy inevitably resulted. By 1973, an EGR valve controlled by manifold vacuum opened or closed to admit exhaust to the intake tract only under certain conditions. Control systems grew more sophisticated as automakers gained experience; Volkswagen's "Coolant Controlled Exhaust Gas Recirculation" system of 1973 exemplified this evolution: a coolant temperature sensor blocked vacuum to the EGR valve until the engine reached normal operating temperature. This prevented driveability problems due to unnecessary exhaust induction; NO_{x} forms under elevated temperature conditions generally not present with a cold engine. Moreover, the EGR valve was controlled, in part, by vacuum drawn from the carburetor's venturi, which allowed more precise constraint of EGR flow to only those engine load conditions under which NO_{x} is likely to form. Later, backpressure transducers were added to the EGR valve control to further tailor EGR flow to engine load conditions. Most modern engines now need exhaust gas recirculation to meet NO_{x} emissions standards. However, recent innovations have led to the development of engines that do not require them. The 3.6 Chrysler Pentastar engine is one example that does not require EGR.

== EGR ==
The exhaust gas contains water vapor and carbon dioxide which both have lower heat capacity ratio than air. Adding exhaust gas therefore reduces pressure and temperature during the isentropic compression in the cylinder, thereby lowering the adiabatic flame temperature.

In a typical automotive spark-ignited (SI) engine, 5% to 15% of the exhaust gas is routed back to the intake as EGR. The maximum quantity is limited by the need of the mixture to sustain a continuous flame front during the combustion event; excessive EGR in poorly set up applications can cause misfires and partial burns. Although EGR does measurably slow combustion, this can largely be compensated for by advancing spark timing. The impact of EGR on engine efficiency largely depends on the specific engine design, and sometimes leads to a compromise between efficiency and NO_{x} emissions. In certain types of situations, a properly operating EGR can theoretically increase the efficiency of gasoline engines via several mechanisms:

- Reduced throttle losses. The addition of inert exhaust gas into the intake system means that for a given power output, the throttle plate must be opened further, resulting in increased inlet manifold pressure and reduced throttling losses.
- Reduced heat rejection. Lowered peak combustion temperatures not only reduces NO_{x} formation, it also reduces the loss of thermal energy to combustion chamber surfaces, leaving more available for conversion to mechanical work during the expansion stroke.
- Reduced chemical dissociation. The lower peak temperatures result in more of the released energy remaining as sensible energy near Top Dead Center (TDC), rather than being bound up (early in the expansion stroke) in the dissociation of combustion products. This effect is minor compared to the first two.

EGR is typically not employed at high loads because it would reduce peak power output. This is because it reduces the intake charge density. EGR is also omitted at idle (low-speed, zero load) because it would cause unstable combustion, resulting in rough idle.

Since the EGR system recirculates a portion of exhaust gases, over time the valve can become clogged with carbon deposits, which will prevent it from operating properly. Clogged EGR valves can sometimes be cleaned, but replacement is necessary if the valve is faulty.

== Diesel engines ==
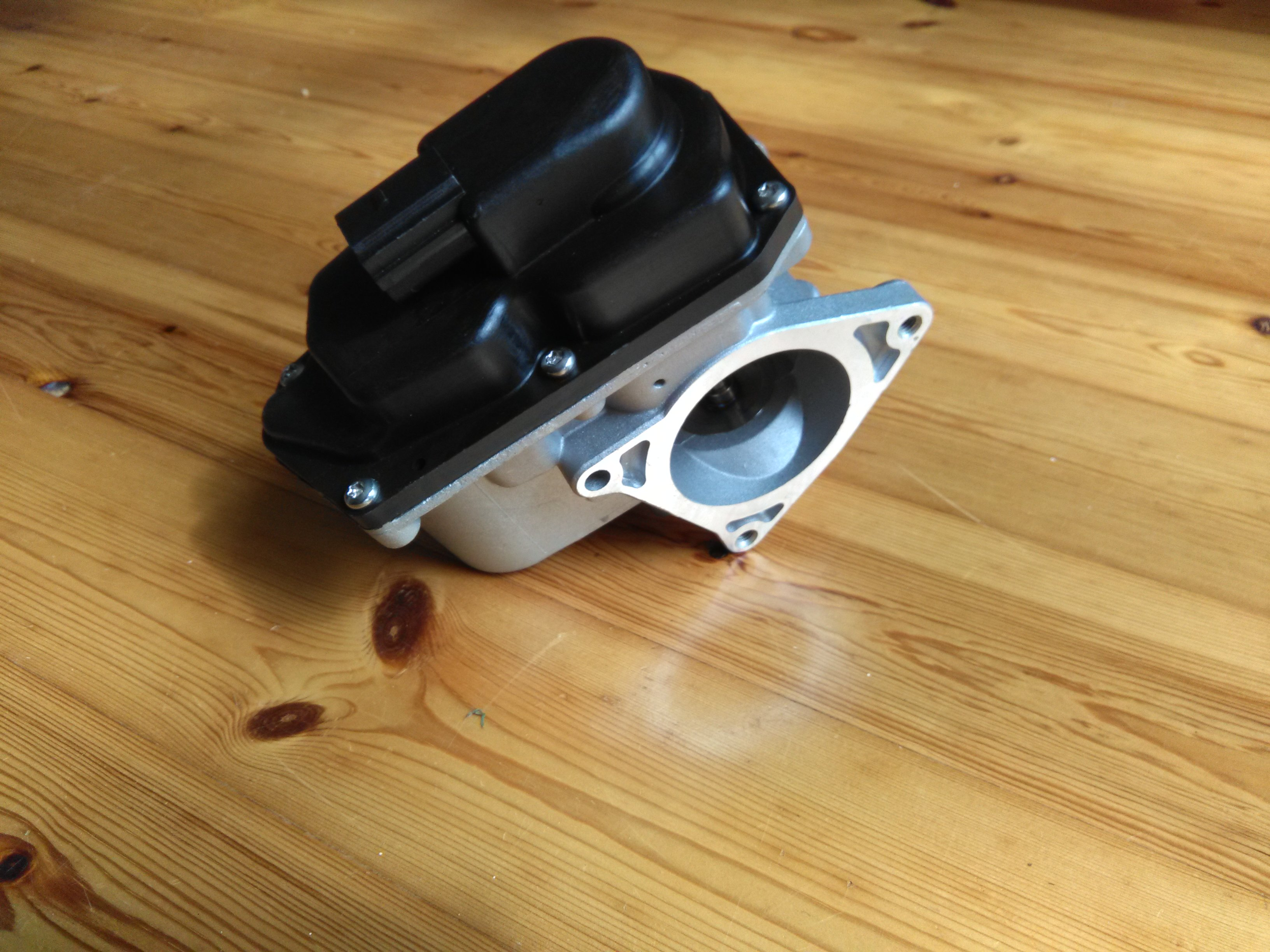
Electronically actuated EGR Valve for VW BMN engine

Because diesel engines depend on the heat of compression to ignite their fuel, they are fundamentally different from spark-ignited engines. The physical process of diesel fuel combustion is such that the most complete combustion occurs at the highest temperatures. However, the production of nitrogen oxides (NO_{x}) increases at high temperatures. The goal of EGR is thus to reduce NO_{x} production by reducing the combustion temperature.

In modern diesel engines, the EGR gas is usually cooled with a heat exchanger to allow the introduction of a greater mass of recirculated gas. However, uncooled EGR designs do exist; these are often referred to as hot-gas recirculation (HGR). Cooled EGR components are exposed to repeated, rapid changes in temperatures, which can cause coolant leak and catastrophic engine failure.

Unlike spark-ignition engines, diesel engines are not limited by the need for a contiguous flamefront. Furthermore, since diesels always operate with excess air, they benefit (in terms of reduced NO_{x} output) from EGR rates as high as 50%. However, a 50% EGR rate is only suitable when the diesel engine is at idle, since this is when there is otherwise a large excess of air.

Because modern diesel engines often have a throttle, EGR can reduce the need for throttling, thereby eliminating this type of loss in the same way that it does for spark-ignited engines. In a naturally aspirated (i.e. non-turbocharged) engine, such a reduction in throttling also reduces the problem of engine oil being sucked past the piston rings into the cylinder and causing oil-derived carbon deposits there.

In diesel engines in particular, EGR systems come with serious drawbacks, one of which is a reduction in engine longevity. For example, because the EGR system routes exhaust gas directly back into the cylinder intake without any form of filtration, this exhaust gas contains carbon particulates. Because these tiny particles are abrasive, the recirculation of this material back into the cylinder increases engine wear. This is because these carbon particles will blow by the piston rings (causing piston-cylinder-interface wear in the process) and then end up in the crankcase oil, where they will cause further wear throughout the engine simply because their tiny size passes through typical oil filters. This enables them to be recirculated indefinitely (until the next oil change takes place).

Exhaust gas—which consists largely of nitrogen, carbon dioxide, and water vapor—has a higher specific heat than air, so it still serves to lower peak combustion temperatures. However, adding EGR to a diesel engine reduces the specific heat ratio of the combustion gases in the power stroke. This reduces the amount of power that can be extracted by the piston, thereby reducing the thermodynamic efficiency.

EGR also tends to reduce the completeness of fuel combustion during the power stroke. This is evident by the increase in particulate emissions that correspond to an increase in EGR.

Particulate matter (mainly carbon and also known as soot) that is not burned in the power stroke represents wasted energy. Because of stricter regulations on particulate matter (PM), the soot-increasing effect of EGR required the introduction of further emission controls in order to compensate for the resulting PM emission increases. The most common soot-control device is a diesel particulate filter (DPF) installed downstream of the engine in the exhaust system. This captures soot but causes a reduction in fuel efficiency due to the back pressure created.

Diesel particulate filters come with their own set of very specific operational and maintenance requirements. Firstly, as the DPF captures the soot particles (which are made far more numerous due to the use of EGR), the DPF itself progressively becomes loaded with soot. This soot must then be burned off, either actively or passively.

At sufficiently high temperatures, the nitrogen dioxide component of NO_{x} emissions is the primary oxidizer of the soot caught in the DPF at normal operating temperatures. This process is known as passive regeneration, and it is only partially effective at burning off the captured soot. At high EGR rates, the effectiveness of passive regeneration is further reduced. This, in turn, necessitates periodic active regeneration of the DPF by burning diesel fuel directly in the oxidation catalyst in order to significantly increase exhaust-gas temperatures through the DPF to the point where PM is incinerated by the residual oxygen in the exhaust.

Because diesel fuel and engine oil both contain non-burnable (i.e. metallic and mineral) impurities, the incineration of soot (PM) in the DPF leaves behind a residue known as ash. For this reason, after repeated regeneration events, eventually the DPF must either be physically removed and cleaned in a special external process, or it must be replaced.

As noted earlier, the feeding of the low-oxygen exhaust gas into the diesel engine's air intake engenders lower combustion temperatures, thereby reducing emissions of NO_{x}. By replacing some of the fresh air intake with inert gases EGR also allows the engine to reduce the amount of injected fuel without compromising ideal air-fuel mixture ratio, therefore reducing fuel consumption in low engine load situation (for ex. while the vehicle is coasting or cruising). Power is not reduced by EGR at any times, as EGR is not employed in high load engine situations. This allows engines to still deliver maximum power when needed, but lower fuel consumption despite large cylinder volume when partial load is sufficient to meet the power needs of the car and the driver.

EGR has nothing to do with oil vapor re-routing from a positive crankcase ventilation system (PCV) system, as the latter is only there to reduce oil vapor emissions, and can be present on engines with or without any EGR system. However, the tripartite mixture resulting from employing both EGR and PCV in an engine (i.e. exhaust gas, fresh air, and oil vapour) can cause the buildup of sticky tar in the intake manifold and valves. This mixture can also cause problems with components such as swirl flaps, where fitted. These problems, which effectively take the form of an undesirable positive-feedback loop, will worsen as the engine ages. For example, as the piston rings progressively wear out, more crankcase oil will get into the exhaust stream. Simultaneously, more fuel and soot and combustion byproducts will gain access to the engine oil.

The result of this recirculation of both exhaust gas and crankcase oil vapour is again an increase in soot production, which however is effectively countered by the DPF, which collects these and in the end will burn those unburnt particles during regeneration, converting them into CO_{2} and water vapour emissions, that - unlike NO_{x} gases - have no negative health effects.

Modern cooled EGR systems help reduce engine wear by using the waste heat recouped from the recirculated gases to help warm the coolant and hence the engine block faster to operating temperature. This also helps lower fuel consumption through reducing the time after cold starts during which the engine controller has to inject somewhat larger amounts of fuel into the cylinders to counter the effects of fuel vapor condensation on cylinder walls and lowered combustion effectiveness because of the engine block still being below ideal operating temperature. Lowering combustion temperatures also helps reducing the oxidization of engine oil, as the most significant factor affecting that is exposure of the oil to high temperatures.

Although engine manufacturers have refused to release details of the effect of EGR on fuel economy, the EPA regulations of 2002 that led to the introduction of cooled EGR were associated with a 3% drop in engine efficiency, thus bucking the trend of a 0.5% annual increase.

== See also ==
- Diesel exhaust
- Secondary air injection

== Sources ==
- Heywood, John B., "Internal Combustion Engine Fundamentals," McGraw Hill, 1988.
- van Basshuysen, Richard, and Schäfer, Fred, "Internal Combustion Engine Handbook," SAE International, 2004.
- "Bosch Automotive Handbook," 3rd Edition, Robert Bosch GmbH, 1993.
- Alger, Terry (2010). "Clean and Cool" (PDF). Technology Today. 31 (2). San Antonio, Texas: Southwest Research Institute: 10–13. ISSN 1528-431X.
- Sileghem, Louis; Van De Ginste, Maarten; Sierens, Roger; Verhelst, Sebastian; Vancoillie, Jeroen (2011). "Methanol as a Fuel for Modern Spark-Ignition Engines: Efficiency Study". Department of Flow, Heat and Combustion Mechanics. Ghent, Belgium: Ghent University – via Research Gate.
