= JASO M345 =

Classification standard for two stroke engine oils

JASO M345 is a quality classification standard for two stroke engine oils for engines of Japanese origin. It was introduced by the Japanese Automotive Standards Organization (JASO) in 1994 as JASO M345-93 with the quality levels JASO FA, JASO FB and JASO FC – with FC setting the highest standard. It was revised in 2004 as JASO M345:2004 which discontinued the FA level, and introduced the new JASO FD level – the FD level supersedes JASO FC as the highest rating. ISO 13738 is a similar, but stricter, specification.

The different quality levels set requirements with regard to properties such as minimum lubrication, minimum detergency, maximum smoke and maximum deposits. A two stroke engine oil is granted the official JASO seal if it has been independently tested. The seal is a rectangle; in the upper quarter of the rectangle will be a serial number, and the lower three quarters will just have the letters FB, FC or FD.

== Overview ==
JASO FA – original spec established regulating lubricity, detergency, initial torque, exhaust smoke and exhaust system blocking. Supposed to exceed API-TC.

JASO FB – improved requirements over FA with regard to lubricity, detergency, exhaust smoke and exhaust system blocking.

JASO FC – lubricity and initial torque requirements same as FB, however far higher requirements over FB with regard to detergency, exhaust smoke and exhaust system blocking.

JASO FD - same as FC, except with far higher detergency requirement.
