= Andrés Balsa =

Spanish boxer, professional wrestler, and football manager

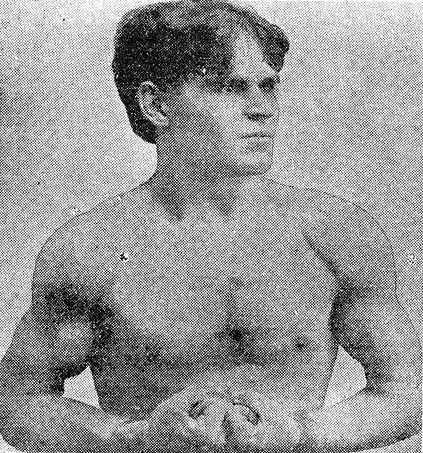
- Andrés Balsa in 1910, in Galician Life.
- Born: Andrés Balsa Antón; 11 March 1883; Mugardos, A Coruña, Spain
- Died: 16 December 1973 (aged 90); Madrid, Spain
- Citizenship: Spanish
- Occupations: Sailor; Boxer; Professional wrestler; Actor; Football manager
- Known for: Manager of Valencia CF
Association football career
- Full name: Andrés Balsa Antón
Managerial career
- Years: Team
- 1925–1927: Celta de Vigo
- 1928–1929: Deportivo de La Coruña
- 1929–1931: Cartagena
- 1931–1933: Castellón
- 1935–1936: Valencia
- 1946–1947: Castellón
- 1947–1948: Eldense

Andrés Balsa Antón (11 March 1883 – 16 December 1973) was a Spanish boxer, professional wrestler, and football manager, taking charge over Celta de Vigo, Deportivo de La Coruña, and Valencia CF in the 1920s and 1930s.

He had a brief acting career, playing the role of Ursus in the Italian film Quo Vadis?, but he is best remembered for his fight against Jack Dempsey in 1921.

== Early life ==
Andrés Balsa was born on 11 March 1883 in Mugardos, A Coruña, as the son of a humble farmer and grandson of a single mother, and his childhood was spent like that of all the children in his town, working very hard and going through hardships.

Unlike the others, however, he eventually outgrew all of them, being six feet tall with its corresponding tonnage, a giant between sizes of 1,65. So, at the beginning of the 20th century, he began to go from fair to fair, giving shows and displaying his strength and fortitude, until he decided to enlist in the merchant marine to head towards America.

== Fighting career ==
=== First steps ===
It was in the decks of those merchant ships that Balsa learned to fight, carrying out night skirmishes as entertainment in the usual impasses of such long voyages. On a trip to New York City in 1902, when he was 19, one of the ship's officers insisted and encouraged him to enter a wrestling tournament on Broadway with a prize of 500 dollars, in which an American champion challenged anyone to fight him, to which Balsa agreed, but only with the condition of not being abandoned if he were injured or badly off; Balsa easily defeated his opponent long before the 15 minutes ran out. He thus decided to leave the Navy, and began investing his prize in training in the free and pugilistic arts.

=== Wrestling career ===
With an imponent height, a great weight, (Note: Sources tend to attribute him with different weights and measurements, going from 100 to 120 kilos, and from 1.80 to two meters of height.) and a strength that the media of the time considered "herculean", Balsa began training under an English champion, a certain Jack Nelson, who introduced him to the official circuit around 1909, taking him on tour through Panama and Cuba, where he defeated tough opponents in wrestling matches, such as the champion in Havana, the Japanese Taro Miyake. However, it was a bittersweet glory, since his fighting style was often compared to "dancing on stage", and was considered unorthodox for purists, who stated that "he lacks any technique", and even the Spanish press, which echoed his victories in the United States and Cuba, described his successes with similar words.

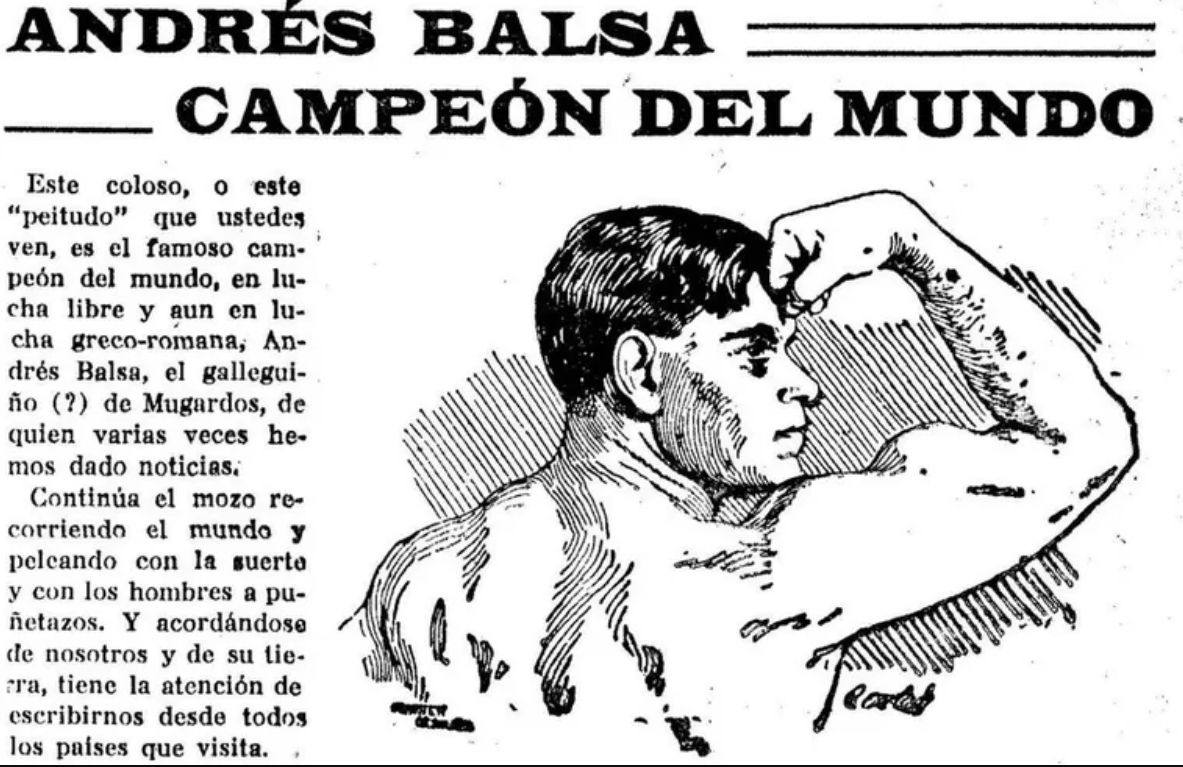
Balsa portrayed in ilustró La Voz in 1917.

By 1912, news about his achievements across the United States was already being covered in some American newspapers, including in Texas, which recounted his exploits in outdoor combat; the Americans soon began to call him "Bull-Dog" because he was unstoppable in a fight. In 1915, Balsa was one of the 35 wrestlers who participated in the world wrestling tournament held in New York, where he achieved three victories before falling to the eventual champion.

His time in the United States, where Balsa had beaten dozens of champions, had earned him a reputation as an invincible champion, which caused him great problems as he could not find any opponents to face; for instance, in October 1916, he went to Panama for a tournament that turned out to be a failure, as no one dared to fight against him, and in a tournament in Lima, he had to shout for someone to fight him, but the only one who accepted the challenge was a Russian who asked him to fight in Greco-Roman wrestling, believing that Balsa would decline the invitation, which did not happen, so the Russian excused himself because he was "unwell that day".

=== Boxing career ===
Confident in his abilities, Balsa decided to leap into the competitive world of boxing, a sport for which he had no technique, no knowledge, no strategy, but despite this, he continued to win in the ring. He is said to have been a pioneer of Spanish boxing in Latin America, making his boxing debut in Santiago, Chile in May 1918, against Victor Vallejos, whom he defeated by knockout. After several fights in Chile and Argentina, where he lost to the "Wild Bull of Las Pampas", Luis Ángel Firpo, he fought in Montevideo on 18 October 1919, against Angel Rodriguez, losing on points. This campaign in Latin America helped him dodge the bloodbath of the First World War in Europe.

After fighting in cities such as Rio de Janeiro, Madrid, and Liverpool, Balsa returned to Galicia at the end of the War, arriving in the port of Vigo on 1 July 1920, where he was received as a true idol, since the press had recounted his adventures in America. He achieved several victories in Galicia against Spanish heavyweights, such as Armando Anderson, Frank Croezier, Francisco Alis, and Salvador Almela, in places like Ferrol, Madrid, and Barcelona, and this victories prompted him to return to New York in 1921, to challenge Jack Dempsey for the world heavyweight title. In the build-up for this challenge, several American newspapers heavily criticized him, stating that "his only important training was in a bullring" and that "Balsa knows as much about boxing as a pig knows about using a toothbrush", but just a few days later, he won a match with such a taste of triumph that the bruised American begged him to be his trainer. However, he ended up being defeated by Dempsey, who would remain the uninterrupted champion until 1926. (Note: Some sources wrongly state that this fight was not held because the defeat suffered by Floyd Johnson prevented it.) Dempsey later stated that he had never faced such an extraordinary rival as Balsa, and that his victory had been due to "pure luck". Oddly, he is still remembered today in America thanks to his fight against Dempsey, while no one remembers him in his native Galicia.

In the following year, on 8 October 1922, he achieved an epic victory against the Cuban champion Antolin Fierro, doing so by knockout in three rounds. Balsa then returned to South America, where in Mexico, he faced the great Canadian boxer Sam Langford, who was knocked down in the fifth round in an eventual loss in six rounds when he broke his hand and was unable to continue; they faced each other twice more, with the Galician losing in both occasions. In 1925 he returned to Spain intending to seek the national title from Paulino Uzcudun, who refused to face Balsa, who that year was crowned Galician heavyweight champion against Raul Rodriguez in Vigo. In the early 1920s, Balsa began suffering a physical decline that would lead him to a series of strong defeats with boxers of not very high category in 1925. Ahead of his last boxing match, Balsa was still weighing the KO from the Belgian Jack Humbeeck a few days earlier, and his 40 years of flesh and muscle weighed much more, and thus he barely lasted two rounds against José Santa, a weak Portuguese who came from sparring, just so that "Hércules" could have some joy.

== Acting career ==
On one of his trips to Mexico, Balsa was invited to a bullfight, where he was forced to grab a fighting bull by the horns with his arms, successfully pinning its head to the ground in just 3 minutes. From then on, he began featuring bull wrestling in his acts, and due to his fame as such, Balsa participated in the Italian film Quo Vadis? directed by Enrico Guazzoni, receiving $5,000 to play the role of Ursus, the protector of the beautiful Ligia, who had to fight a bull in the Colosseum in Rome, which remains one of the most iconic scenes in Cinema history. However, this role has been wrongly attributed to Bruto Castellani, who repeated the role in the 1924 version. He can also be seen in the skin of a gladiator in other famous films like Ben-Hur.

== Managerial career ==
=== First steps ===
From the age of 40, his ability as a fighter began to diminish, so Balsa hung his gloves and announced himself as a physical culture teacher in his gym in Vigo, and soon he also began focusing on a sport that had been attracting his attention for a long time, football. At the time, it was inappropriate for footballers to dedicate time to training the body, and it was in this capacity that Balsa found a living, thus avoiding times of famine that retired boxers like him had to endure at the time.

=== Vigo and Coruña ===
In 1924 he joined the technical staff of Celta de Vigo as a physical trainer, and the pleasant level of his players helped him make the transition from trainer to coach in 1925, replacing Francis Cuggy, and from then on, Balsa's career remained linked to the world of football. His methods were so effective that Vigo won the Galician Regional Championship in 1926, and reached the semifinals of the 1926 Copa del Rey. In the 1927 cup, Vigo won all the games of its group, with 34 goals in favor and only 8 against, but then fell in the round of 16 in a third tiebreaker match against Arenas Club de Getxo. On one occasion, he picked up and carried an injured player off the field by himself. At the end of the season, there was a renewal of the board of directors of Celta, who decided to replace Balsa with the Scottish W. H. Cowan, so despite his achievements in 1926, he was fired from Celta after only one season and a half.

Balsa then joined Deportivo de Coruña as a masseuse, but some sources claim that he actually worked as a coach. He ended up being exploited at Coruña due to the greed of its president, who combined his duty as the team's coach with shows during patron saint festivities in the towns, carried away by the president of the club, appearing under the name El incógnito in Madrid, dressed in a Mexican mask from his good times, recovering the title of world wrestling champion in 1929. At the end of the 1928–29 season, Balsa decided to leave his homeland once again, landing in Cartagena, where he took charge of second division side Cartagena, for whom he fought to raise money for the team, which led him to carry out his last boxing fight on 14 February 1932, against Alfred Ozrout, in Paris. He then returned to Madrid, where he briefly trained the city's municipal police just as he had done in his Mexican stage with the federal fire department.

=== Castellón and Valencia ===
In 1931, Balsa joined the ranks of CD Castellón as a coach, where his work received criticism very similar to that he had as a wrestler, since he was accused of a total lack of knowledge of football technique. Under his responsibility, in the 1931–32 and 1932–33 campaigns, Castellón finished as last classified in the Segunda División. He then moved to Valencia in 1934, around the time that the city was experiencing a football fever due to having reached its first-ever Copa del Rey final, which they lost 1–2 to Madrid FC. In the summer of 1935, however, after the interim manager Antonín Fivébr took a flight to Moscow to experience the revolution, Valencia hired him as coach, thus becoming the first Spaniard coach in the history of the club, where he remained for over a decade.

Balsa made his debut as Valencia's coach on 8 November against Sport de La Plana and stayed as such until 1937, for a total of 1,431 days, and although he won the regional champion in 1937, his overall results at the helm of the team were once again not very outstanding. When the Spanish Civil War broke out, Balsa remained loyal to the Spanish Second Republic, forming part of the new Valencia team made up of workers after the confiscation of the equipment by the employees and footballers. Under his leadership, Valencia reached the final of the 1937 Copa de la España Libre, which they lost 0–1 to Levante. His fidelity to the Republic helped him keep his position in a club founded by Blasquistas, in a time that has been poorly documented, blurred, and skipped by history with the recurring catchphrase "and then the war broke out"; officially he coached at Valencia for two seasons, although he actually coached for four, from 1936 until 1940. Balsa remained in the technical and coaching staff of the Valencian team until 1946, the year in which the trail of Balsa disappeared again.

Balsa went on to manage Castellón (1946–47) and CD Eldense (1947–48). In 1950, Valencia played a friendly match against Burjassot CF for the benefit of their former coach. In his last years, Balsa exhibited himself in some charity events.

== Death ==
At the end of the 1950s, Balsa emigrated to Brazil with his wife, along with his son Andrés, owner of an important estate. At the end of the 1960s, in December 1968, his son died at the age of 43, a victim of a rapid illness, and the family was ruined, so Valencia CF gave him money to return and settle in Valencia. He grew old in Latin America and died discreetly in Madrid on 16 December 1973, at the age of 90.

== Honours ==
Celta de Vigo

- Galician Regional Championship
  - Champions (1): 1925–26

Valencia CF

- Valencian Regional Championship
  - Champions (1): 1936–37
