= Japanese Automotive Standards Organization =

Organization for automotive standards in Japan

The Japanese Automotive Standards Organization (日本自動車規格 (Nihon Jidōsha Kikaku, JASO)) is an organization that sets automotive standards in Japan, similar to the Society of Automotive Engineers (SAE) in the United States. JASO establishes standards for various types of engine oil, including the highest grade for two-stroke engines, which is JASO FD, and JASO MA for four-stroke engines, such as those found in motorcycles.

JASO is a part of the Society of Automotive Engineers of Japan (財団法人自動車技術会, Zaidan-hōjin Jidōsha Gijutsukai; JSAE).

== Classifications ==
It stipulates the lubricating oil requirements for 2-stroke gasoline engines, such as those used in motorcycles, general-purpose machines, and outboard motors, and was established in 1994. For 2-stroke oil, lubricity, cleanliness, exhaust smoke, and exhaust system blockage are evaluated using the test methods specified in JASO M 340, M 341, M 342, and M 343, resulting in the grades FB, FC, and FD. FA has been abolished. The performance classifications are as follows:

- FA: Minimum performance for a 2-stroke engine.
- FB: Superior lubricity and cleanliness compared to FA.
- FC: Low smoke with excellent performance in reducing exhaust smoke and system blockage compared to FB.
- FD: Enhanced cleaning performance at high engine temperatures compared to FC.

Additionally, FB, FC, and FD are adopted as EGB, EGC, and EGD, respectively, in ISO standards.

== See also ==
- American Petroleum Institute
- Society of Automotive Engineers
