= Antonín Fivébr =

Czech footballer (1888–1973)

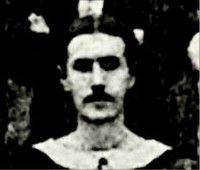

Personal information
- Date of birth: 22 November 1888
- Place of birth: Prague, Austria-Hungary
- Date of death: 26 February 1973 (aged 84)
- Place of death: Prague, Czechoslovakia
- Position: Midfielder

Senior career*
| Years | Team | Apps | (Gls) |
| 1908–1914 | Sparta Prague | | |
| 1914–1918 | Český Lev Plzeň | | |
| 1919–1920 | Sparta Prague | | |
| 1921–1922 | Brescia | | |

Managerial career
- 1921–1923: Brescia
- 1923–1927: Valencia
- 1928–1929: Real Oviedo
- 1929–1931: Valencia
- 1932–1933: Real Murcia
- 1934–1935: Valencia
- 1936: Spartak Moscow
- 1945–1947: Jednota Košice
- * Club domestic league appearances and goals

Antonín Fivébr (22 November 1888 – 26 February 1973) was a Czech football player and manager. He managed clubs such as Valencia, Spartak Moscow, and Brescia.

== Career ==
In 1908, Fivébr joined Sparta Prague to play as a midfielder. Twelve years later in 1920, Fivébr left Sparta to join Brescia in Italy. At Brescia he became a player-manager.

Fivébr went to Spain in 1923 to become the manager of Valencia. He spent seven years as the Valencia coach in three different stints. At Valencia he won three regional championships and won promotion to La Liga in 1931. Other Spanish clubs Fivébr managed were Elche, Real Oviedo, Levante, and Real Murcia.

Fivébr moved to the Soviet Union in 1935. Shortly afterwards in 1936, Fivébr was named the first ever manager of the newly born Spartak Moscow. However, he only lasted two months on the job and was looking for work elsewhere. Fivébr would go on to manage Dynamo Leningrad, Stalinets Moscow, and clubs in Dnipropetrovsk and Zaporizhia.

In 1938, Fivébr returned to his native Czechoslovakia, where he managed Viktoria Žižkov, Jednota Košice, and finally Spartak Trnava.

== Death ==
Fivébr died in his home city of Prague on 26 February 1973.
