= Armed Police Corps =

Urban police of Francoist Spain

Armed and Traffic Police Corps Cuerpo de Policía Armada y de Tráfico
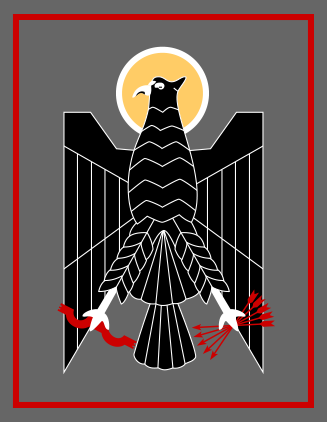
- Common name: Policía Armada
- Abbreviation: FPA

Agency overview
- Formed: 8 March 1941
- Preceding agency: Cuerpo de Seguridad y Asalto
- Dissolved: 4 December 1978
- Superseding agency: Cuerpo de Policía Nacional
- Employees: 20,000 (1968 est.)

Jurisdictional structure
- National agency: Francoist Spain
- Operations jurisdiction: Francoist Spain
- Governing body: Ministry of Governance
- General nature: Civilian police

Operational structure
- Overseen by: Directorate-General for Security
- Headquarters: Madrid
- Parent agency: Spanish Armed Forces

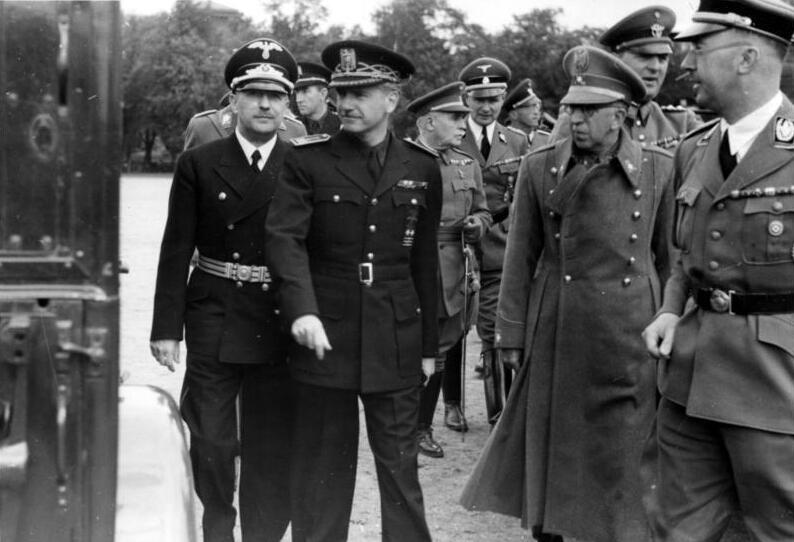
Visit of Ramón Serrano Suñer (second from left) to the headquarters of the LSSAH in Berlin-Lichterfelde, accompanied by Antonio Sagardía Ramos (second from right) and Heinrich Himmler (first from right), 1940.

The Armed Police (Spanish: Policía Armada), conventional long names Cuerpo de Policía Armada y de Tráfico, 'Armed and Traffic Police Corps') and Fuerzas de Policía Armada, 'Armed Police Forces'), —popularly known as los grises, 'the grey ones') owing to the color of their uniforms— was an armed urban police force of Spain established by the Francoist regime in 1939 to enforce the repression of all opposition to the regime. Its mission was "total and permanent vigilance, as well as repression when deemed necessary."

The first commander of the Policía Armada was General Antonio Sagardía Ramos. In its first years of operation the corps was inadequately equipped in armament and vehicles but this situation would be steadily straightened out.

== History ==
Following the overthrow of the Second Spanish Republic in April 1939, the Francoist Spain initially relied on the Army in order to handle public order issues. By means of two sets of laws issued on 3 August 1939 and 8 March 1941 the Spanish State reorganized the police forces of Spain and established the Armed Police as a paramilitary national armed police that could be used to suppress disturbance of the public order and political organization in urban areas. Armed and trained for this purpose, it was intended to provide a more effective force for internal security duties in the large cities of Spain than the Civil Guard that operated mainly in rural areas.

At the time of the Spanish coup of July 1936 that marked the onset of the Spanish Civil War most garrisons of the uniformed civilian police corps, the Cuerpo de Seguridad had stayed loyal to the Republican government and many of their units fought valiantly in the battlefronts against the Nationalists. This display of loyalty towards the Spanish Republic brought about the disbandment of the corps by General Franco at the end of the Civil War. The guards of the Cuerpo de Seguridad who had survived the war and the ensuing Francoist purges were made part of the Policía Armada, the corps that replaced it.

The Policía Armada was placed under the Directorate-General of Security (Dirección General de Seguridad) of the Spanish Ministry of the Interior (Ministerio de la Gobernación) and operated in most large population centers in Spain. Towards the last phase of the Francoist State it had earned a wide reputation as a ferocious corps, especially in the largest cities such as Madrid, Barcelona, Bilbao and Valencia, as well as the industrial areas of Spain such as parts of Asturias and the Basque country, where its well-equipped anti-riot units were ruthless and effective in quelling demonstrations by university students and workers that were often very large.

In the months after the death of the caudillo the Armed Police actively cracked down on protests and political rallies, continuing the infamous riot control operations of the Francoist State. Viewed as unpopular and too closely identified with Franco's Spain, the Policía Armada was slightly reorganized in the first years of the Spanish transition to democracy. The effort, however, proved itself hopeless as the brutal and harsh image of the corps could not be improved and in 1978 the Armed Police was replaced by the Cuerpo de Policía Nacional (Corps of National Police), later dissolved in 1986 alongside the Cuerpo Superior de Policía (Superior Police Corps) to give way to a merger between uniformed and plainclothes urban police forces resulting in the modern day Cuerpo Nacional de Policía (National Police Corps).

As its other function was traffic and road safety, its duties in all national highways outside the metropolitan areas ended in June 1959, when the Civil Guard took over.

=== Human rights abuses ===
The Policía Armada, together with the Guardia Civil, became notorious during the decades of Francoism for its ruthless methods and for widespread human rights abuses against its victims. Indiscriminate beatings of detainees and torture, with or without interrogation, were commonplace in the many police stations (Comisarías) as well as in the headquarters of the Armed Police. Interrogations usually included a member of the Brigada Político-Social, the Francoist political repression wing. The brutal image of the Spanish police would be so pervasive that it has continued to haunt the National Police Corps that replaced the Policía Armada following the Spanish Transition to this day.

== Ranks ==
The ranks and insignia of the Policía Armada displayed its military character and structure. When the National Police Corps replaced it in 1979, it would take 7 years before the rank system was replaced.

=== Officers ===
Spain

(1939–1977)

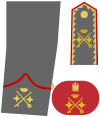
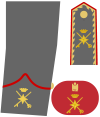
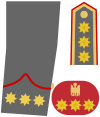
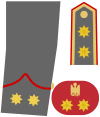
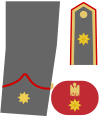
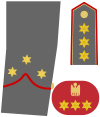
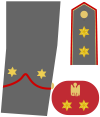
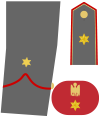
General de División
(Commissioner)
General de Brigada
(Assistant Commissioner)
Coronel
(Chief Superintendent)
Teniente Coronel
(Superintendent)
Comandante
Capitán
Teniente
Alférez
(Station Inspector)

=== Non-commissioned ranks ===
Spain

(1939–1977)

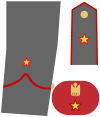

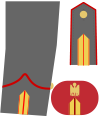

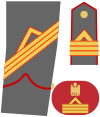

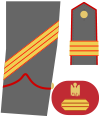

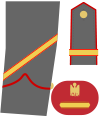

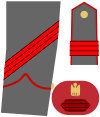

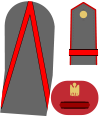

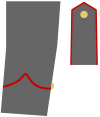

Subteniente
(Sub-inspector)
Brigada
(Head Constable)
Sargento Primero
(Staff Sergeant)
Sargento
(Sergeant)
Cabo Primero
(Corporal)
Cabo
(Lance Corporal)
Policía de Primera
(Senior Constable)
Policía
(Policeman,
Constable)

=== Vehicles ===
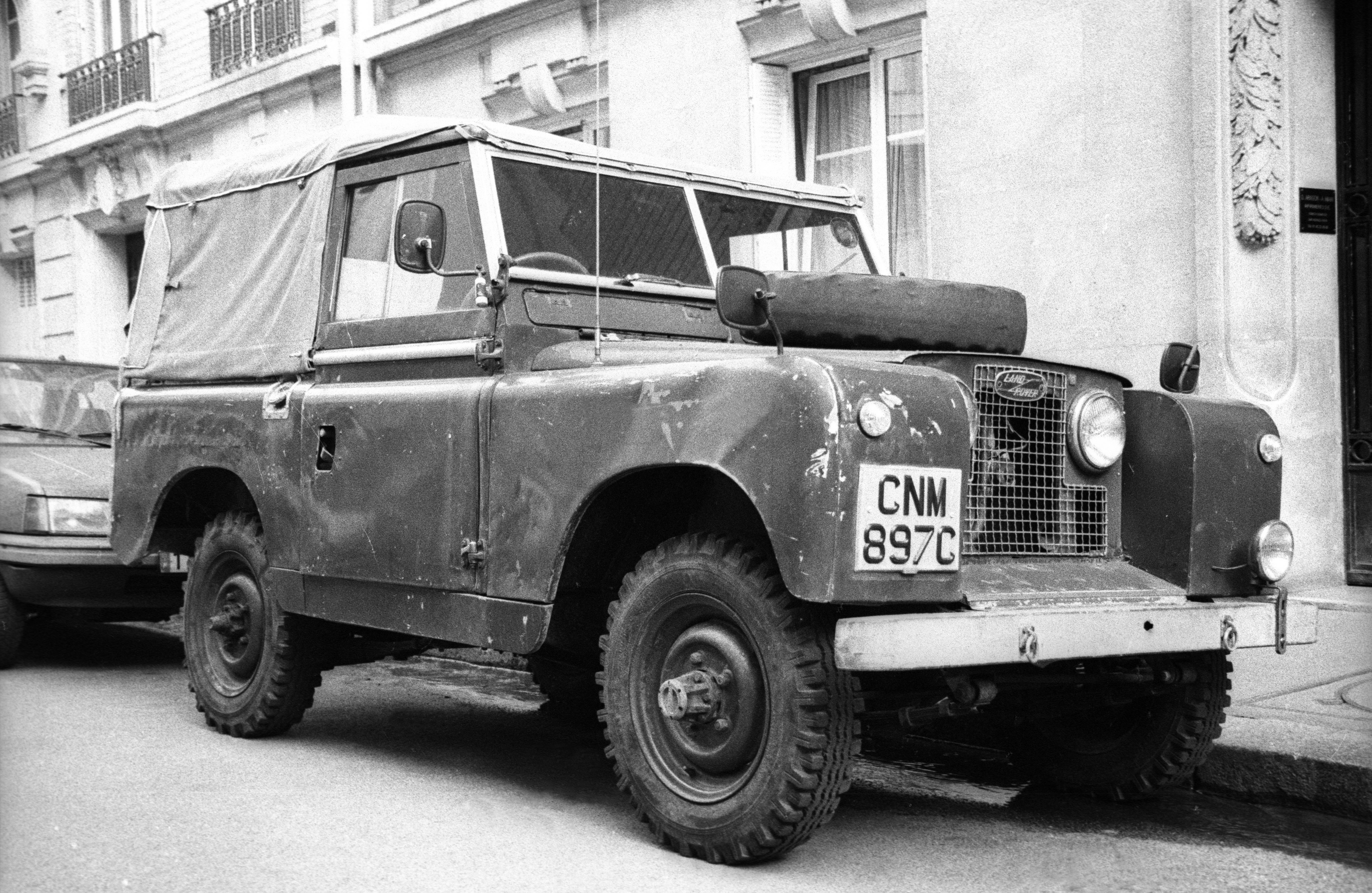
Land Rover Series II.

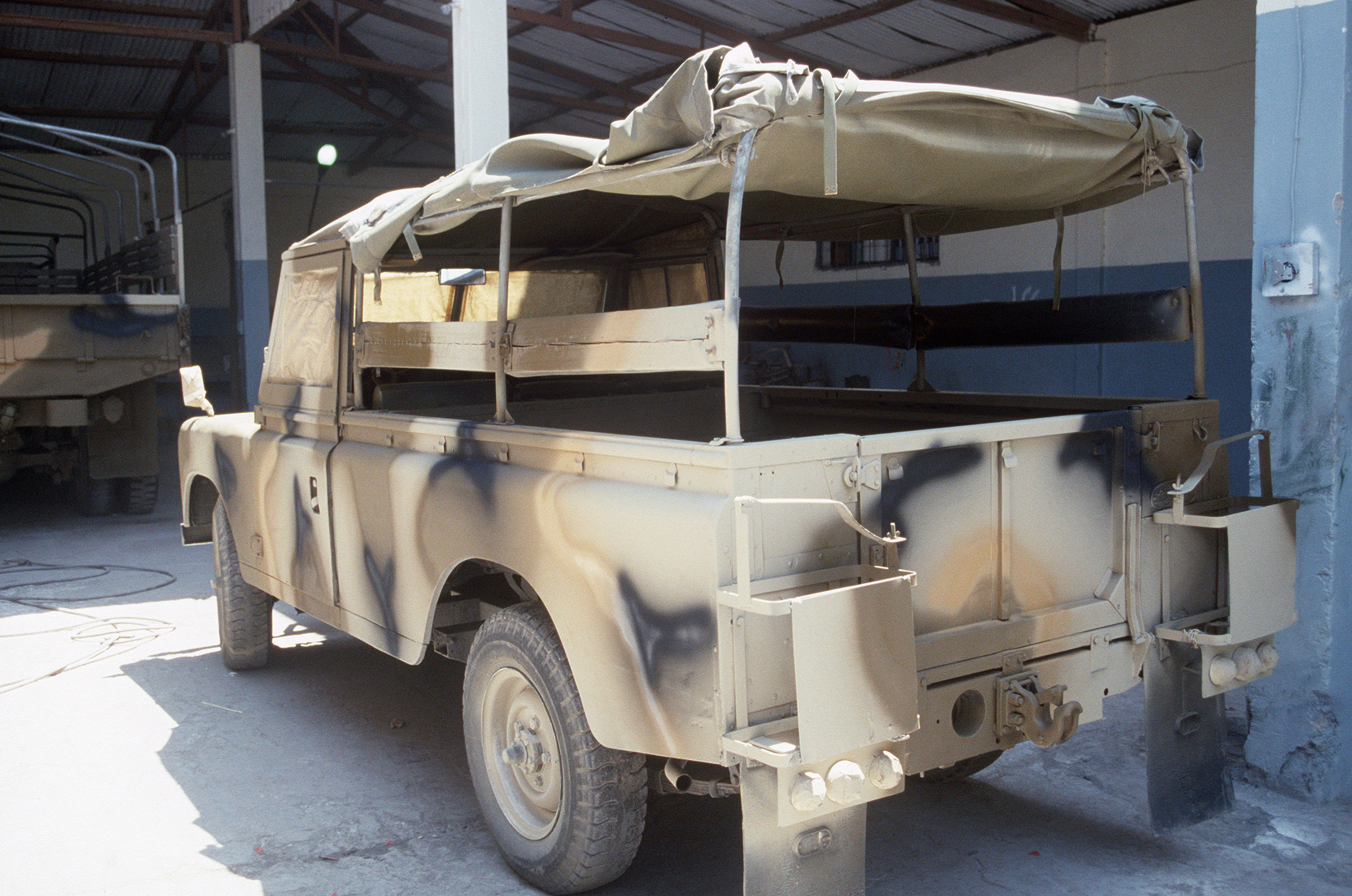
Land Rover Series III.

The Armed Police used different types of vehicles until its disbandment in 1978. Their registration plates had the letters FPA (Fuerzas de Policía Armada) in black over white.

The Mobile Units (Banderas Móviles) used the following vehicles:

- Land Rover Santana S-II four-wheel drive vehicles
- Land Rover Santana S-III four-wheel drive vehicles in their short and long versions
- Avia buses
- Ebro B-45 trucks
- Sanglas 400 motorcycles

The General Reserve Companies (Compañías de Reserva General) used the following:

- Avia 1250 vans
- Büssing riot water cannons
- Dodge tankettes
- DKW N1000 vans

The Garrison Units (Banderas de Guarnición) were equipped with:

- SEAT 1400 cars
- SEAT 1500 cars
- SEAT 124 station wagon cars
- Sava J4 patrol wagons
- Traffic patrol bicycles

The Cavalry Platoons (Caballería) used Avia 2500 trucks that could carry four horses each for their anti-riot operations, troops were only armed with batons and pistons while sporting lances for ceremonial parades.

== See also ==
- Carabineros
- Guardia Civil
- Cuerpo de Seguridad y Asalto
- Cuerpo General de Policía
- Political repression
- White Terror (Spain)
