= General Ramos =

General Ramos may refer to:

- Antonio J. Ramos (born 1946), U.S. Air Force brigadier general
- Antonio Sagardía Ramos (1880–1962), Spanish Army general of the artillery
- Fidel V. Ramos (1928–2022), Armed Forces of the Philippines general
- Luiz Eduardo Ramos (born 1956), Brazilian Army four-star general
