= Alfa Romeo Romeo =

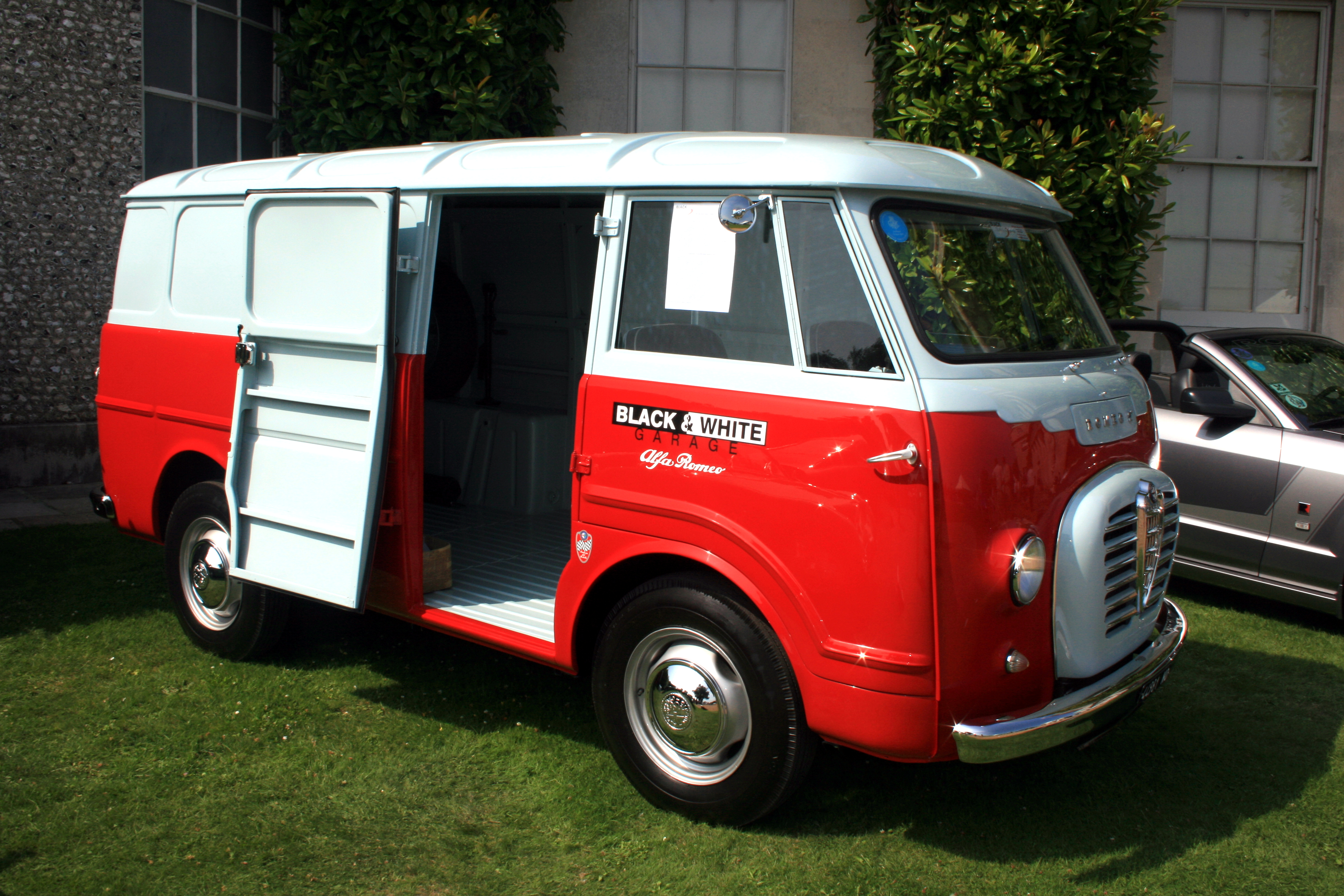
- Alfa Romeo Romeo 2 Furgone

Overview
- Manufacturer: Alfa Romeo
- Production: 1954–1983
- Assembly: Italy; Spain (Romeo 2)

Body and chassis
- Class: Light commercial vehicle (M)
- Body style: Van; Pickup truck
- Layout: FF layout
- Related: Nissan Trade

Chronology
- Predecessor: Alfa Romeo 900
- Successor: Alfa Romeo AR6; Nissan Trade (Spain)

The Alfa Romeo Romeo is a light commercial, cabover van and pickup truck that was introduced by the Italian automaker Alfa Romeo in 1954 as the Alfa Romeo Autotutto ("all purpose"). The line of vans continued to be built until 1983, when it was replaced by relabelled Fiat and Iveco commercials. In Spain, where this vehicle was also built, it was rebodied and kept in production into the early 2000s, first as an Ebro or Avia and finally as the Nissan Trade.

== Romeo ==
Alfa Romeo Romeo

Overview
- Manufacturer: Alfa Romeo
- Also called: Alfa Romeo T10; Alfa Romeo Autotutto
- Production: 1954–1957

Powertrain
- Engine: petrol: 1,290 cc I4; diesel: 1,158 cc supercharged 2-stroke I2

The first Alfa Romeo T10 "Autotutto" ("all purpose") was unveiled at the 1954 Turin Motor Show in panel and minibus versions. Later, more versions became available as Alfa Romeo introduced numerous body versions: van, high-roof van, "Promiscuo" (van with additional side windows and rear seating), minibus, school bus, ambulance, pickup, drop-side truck and double-cab truck. In addition, coachbuilding companies made their own versions.

The van used the 1,290 cc Alfa Romeo Twin Cam straight-four engine detuned to 37 hp (27 kW) and had a top speed of 60 mph (97 km/h). This engine was later used on the Giulietta Berlina. The optional two-cylinder, supercharged two-stroke diesel engine had 30 hp (22 kW) and managed a top speed of 75 km/h (47 mph).

== Romeo 2 ==
Alfa Romeo Romeo 2
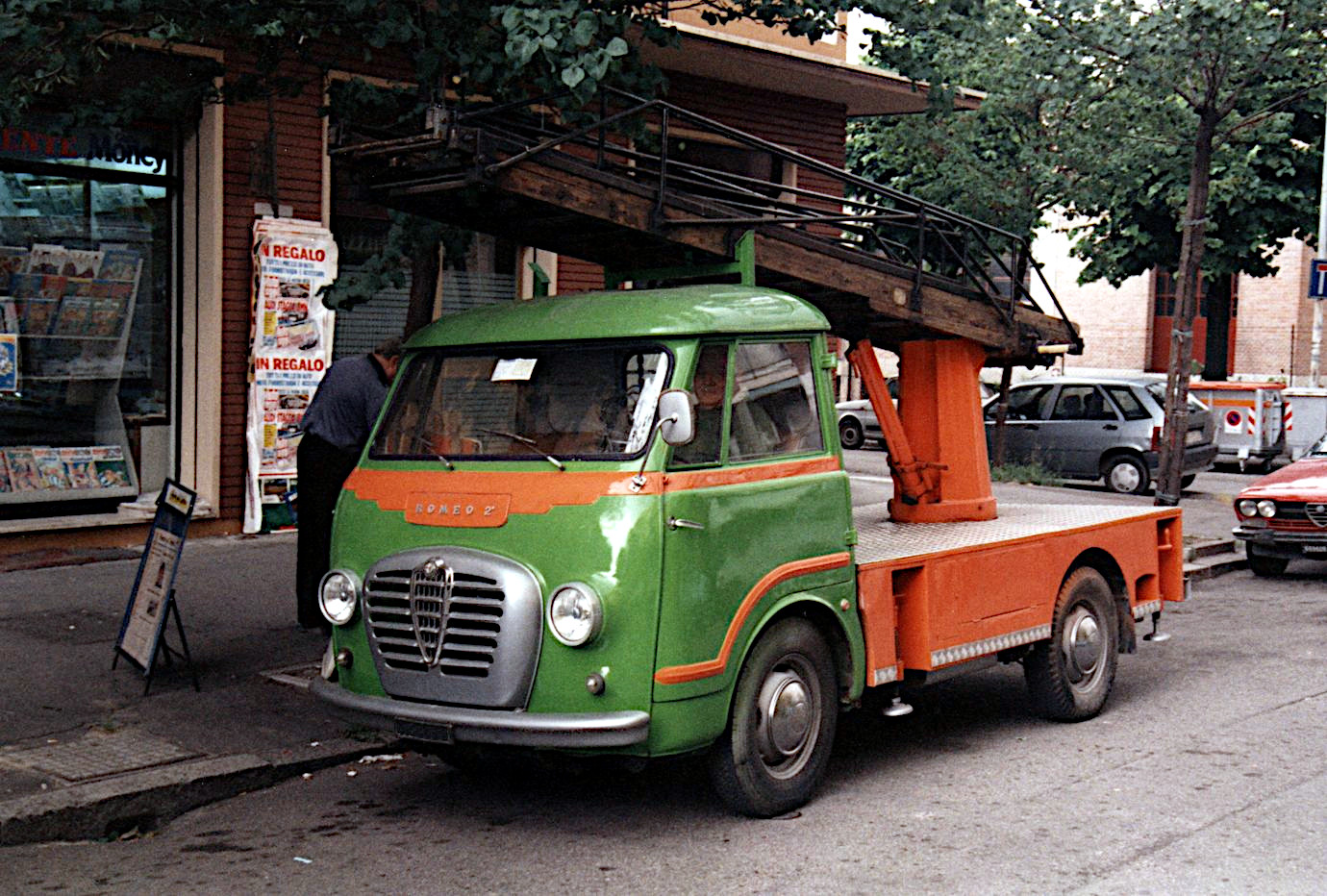
- Romeo 2 lorry

Overview
- Production: 1957–1966

Powertrain
- Engine: petrol: 1,290 cc I4; diesel: 1,158 cc supercharged 2-stroke I2; 1,760 cc Perkins 4.99 I4 (Spain)
- Transmission: 4-speed manual ZF transmission

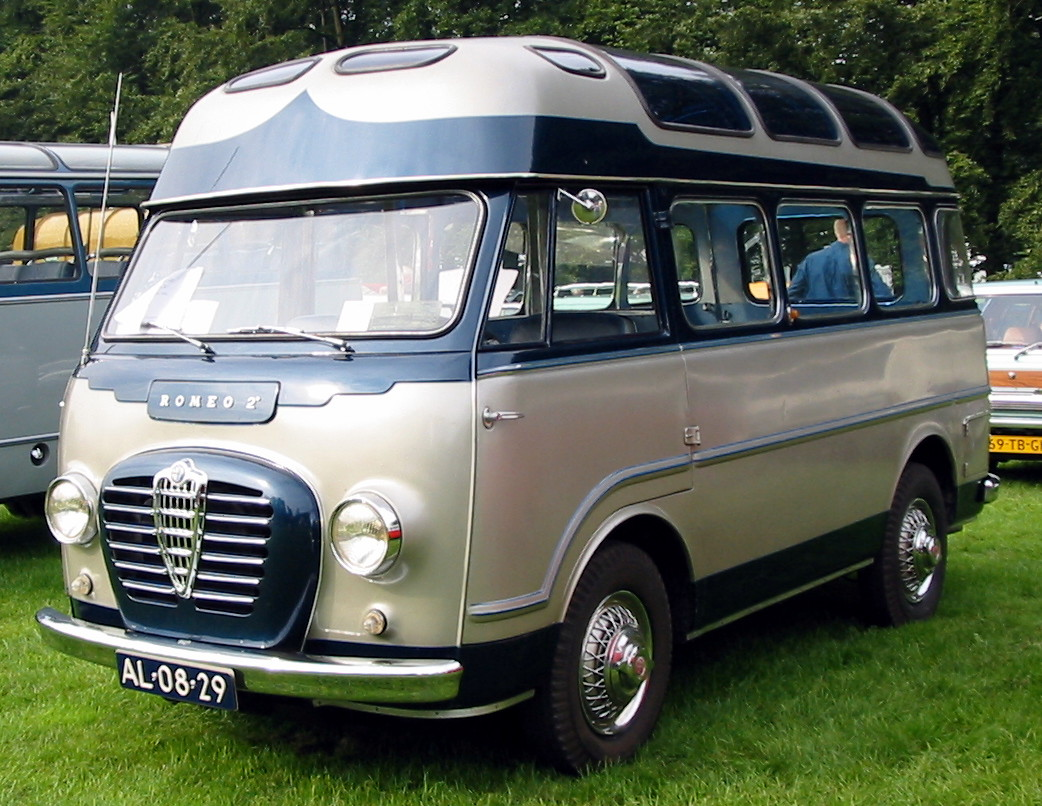
Romeo 2 minibus

The updated Romeo 2 version was introduced in 1957/ It was assembled in Italy and also built under license in Spain by FADISA (Fabricacion de Automoviles Diesel S.A.). The Spanish version had a 1.6-liter Perkins 4.99 diesel engine and a gearbox with synchronization on all forward gears.

== Romeo 3 ==
Alfa Romeo Romeo 3

Overview
- Also called: Alfa Romeo Romeo
- Production: 1966

Powertrain
- Transmission: 4-speed manual ZF transmission

Chronology
- Predecessor: Romeo 2
- Successor: A12/F12

The final version, the Romeo 3, was introduced in 1966. The Romeo 3 had various improvements, including a hydraulic clutch and adjustable driver's seat. It had a short production run of around six months before being replaced by the Giulia 1300 engined F12 and A12 models. In all, some 23,000 Romeos were produced between 1954 and 1966.

== F12/A12 and F11/A11 ==
Alfa Romeo F11/F12/A11/A12

Overview
- Also called: Ebro F-100, F-108
- Production: 1967–1983; 1973–1983 (diesel); 17,899 built

Body and chassis
- Related: Nissan Trade

Powertrain
- Engine: 1,290 cc petrol I4; 1,760 cc Perkins 4.108 diesel I4
- Transmission: 4-speed manual ZF transmission

Dimensions
- Wheelbase: 230 cm (91 in)
- Length: 449 cm (177 in)
- Width: 180 cm (71 in)

In 1967, the Autotutto was replaced with the Giulia-engined Alfa Romeo F12 and A12 vans. The front of the vehicle was updated with a wider chrome and mesh grille, and the 1,290 cc Alfa Romeo twin cam engine was updated to 52 hp (38 kW). The front-engined van had a four-speed gearbox and front-wheel drive.

In 1973, an inline-four 1,760 cc Perkins diesel (4.108) with 50 hp (37 kW) was released. This engine was also available in the Giulia sedan from 1976. The van had a top speed of around 115 km/h (71 mph). The front brakes were discs and rear ones drums. Abandoning the use of a model name, "F" depicted a furgone, or van, "A" depicted an autocarro or light truck, and "12" indicated the carrying capacity of 12 quintali (1 quintale = 100 kg (220 lb)).

Between 1967 and 1971, the lighter A11 and F11 versions were also available. These has a lighter payload and a lower horsepower rating. All Alfa Romeo vans were facelifted in 1977 with a new black plastic radiator grille, and chrome badging was replaced with black adhesive stickers. Production stopped in 1983, by when the total production of A11, A12, F11, and F12 vans was around 17,300 units.

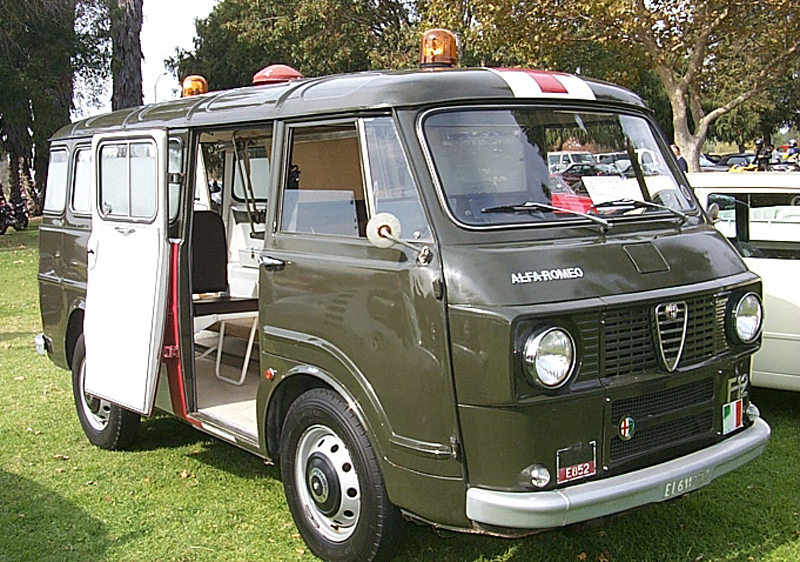
1967-1977 Alfa Romeo F12 (pre-facelift with metal grille)

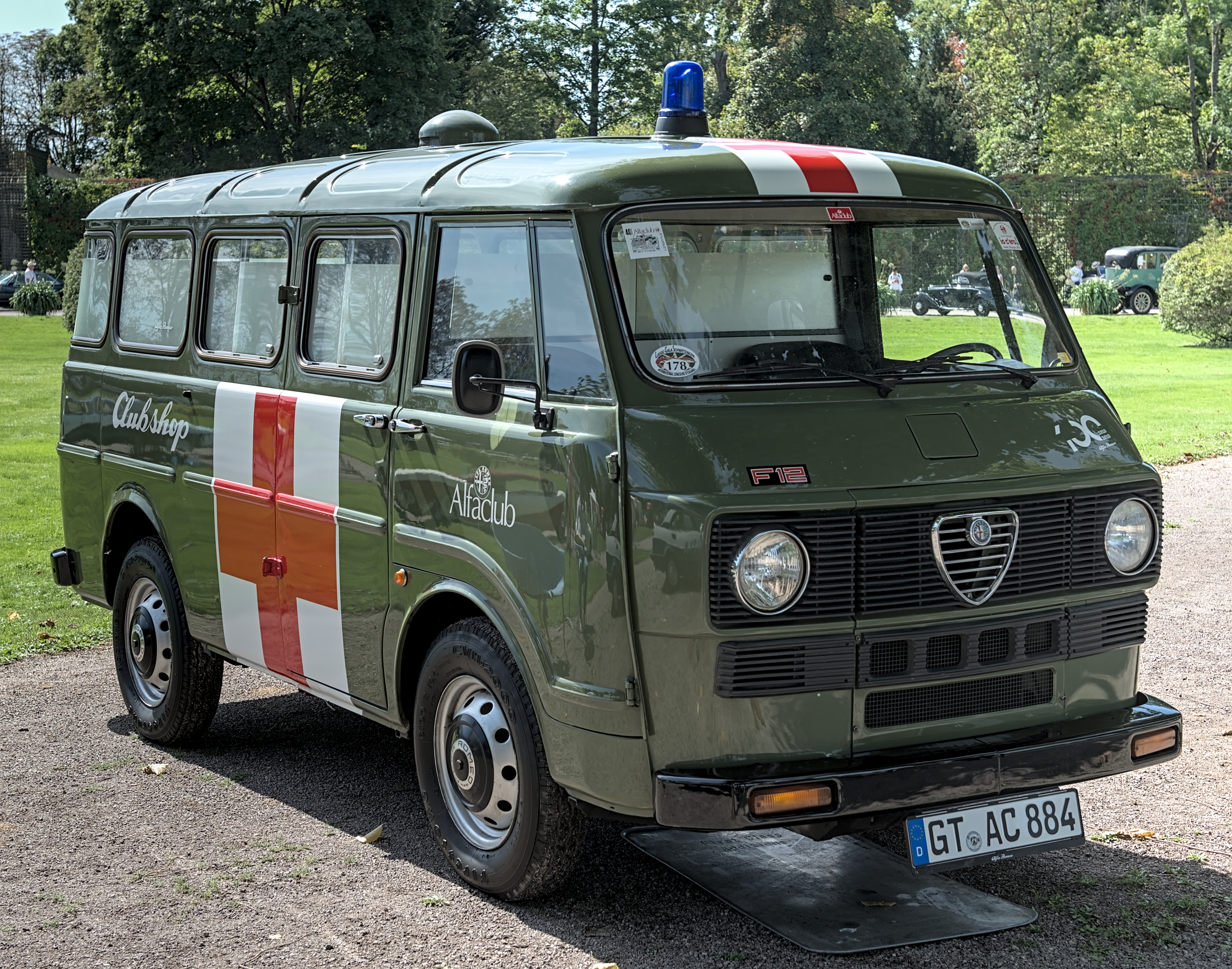
1977-1983 Alfa Romeo F12 (facelift version)

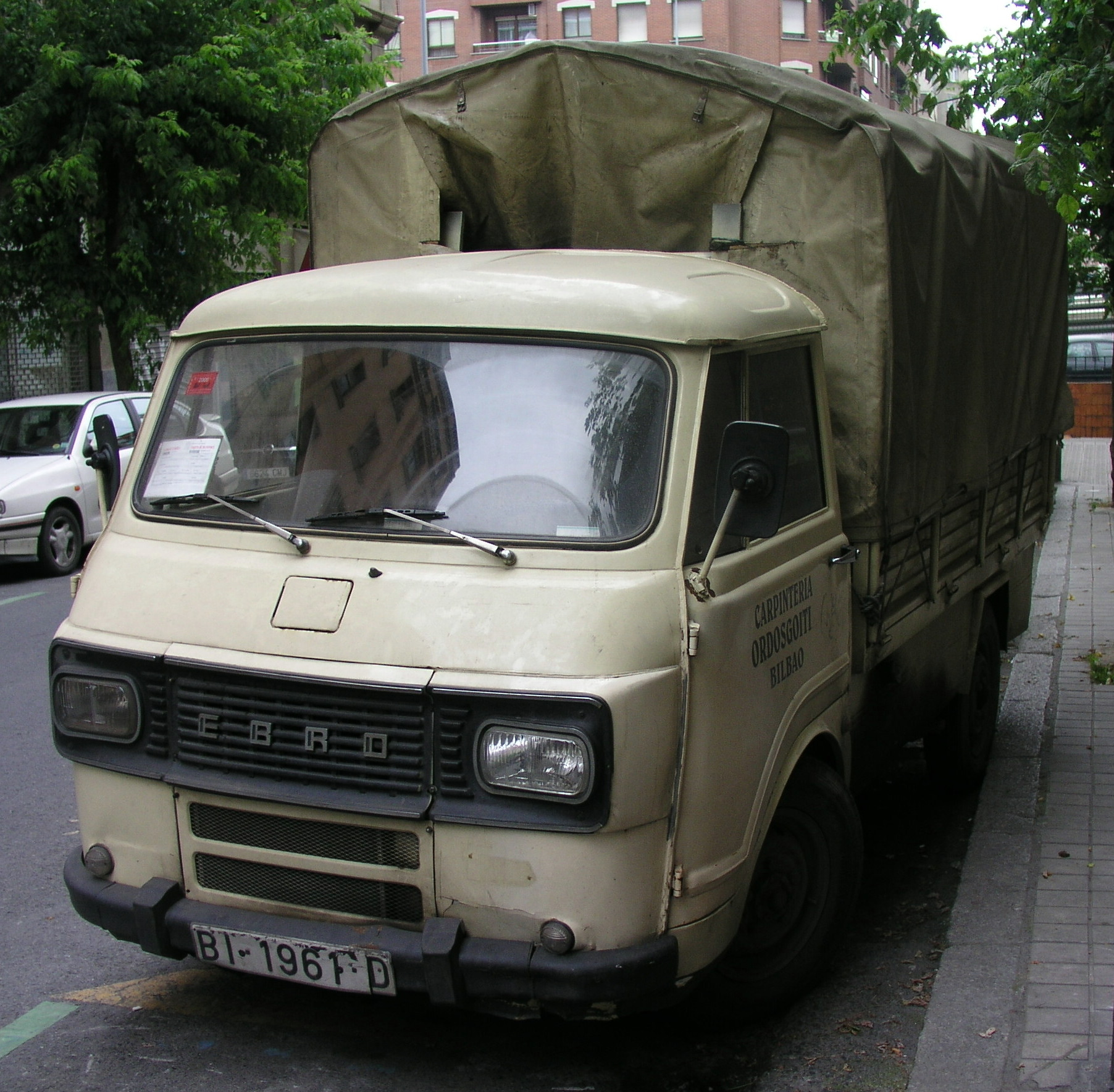
The facelifted Ebro F-108 (introduced in 1971)

=== In Spain ===
In 1967, Motor Ibérica took over FADISA, the company that made Ebro trucks and merged the companies products. The Alfa Romeo F12 was renamed the Ebro F-100 in Spain, receiving a facelift with a black plastic grille in 1971. It was completely rebodied in 1976, with the new model being sold as the Avia 1000/1250/2000 or the Ebro F-series, and was eventually renamed the Ebro Trade. In 1986 it was renamed Nissan; Nissan Motors took full control of Motor Ibérica and Ebro Trucks the following year. The Nissan Trade continued to be made until the beginning of the 2000s at the Ávila plant in Spain.

== Replacement ==
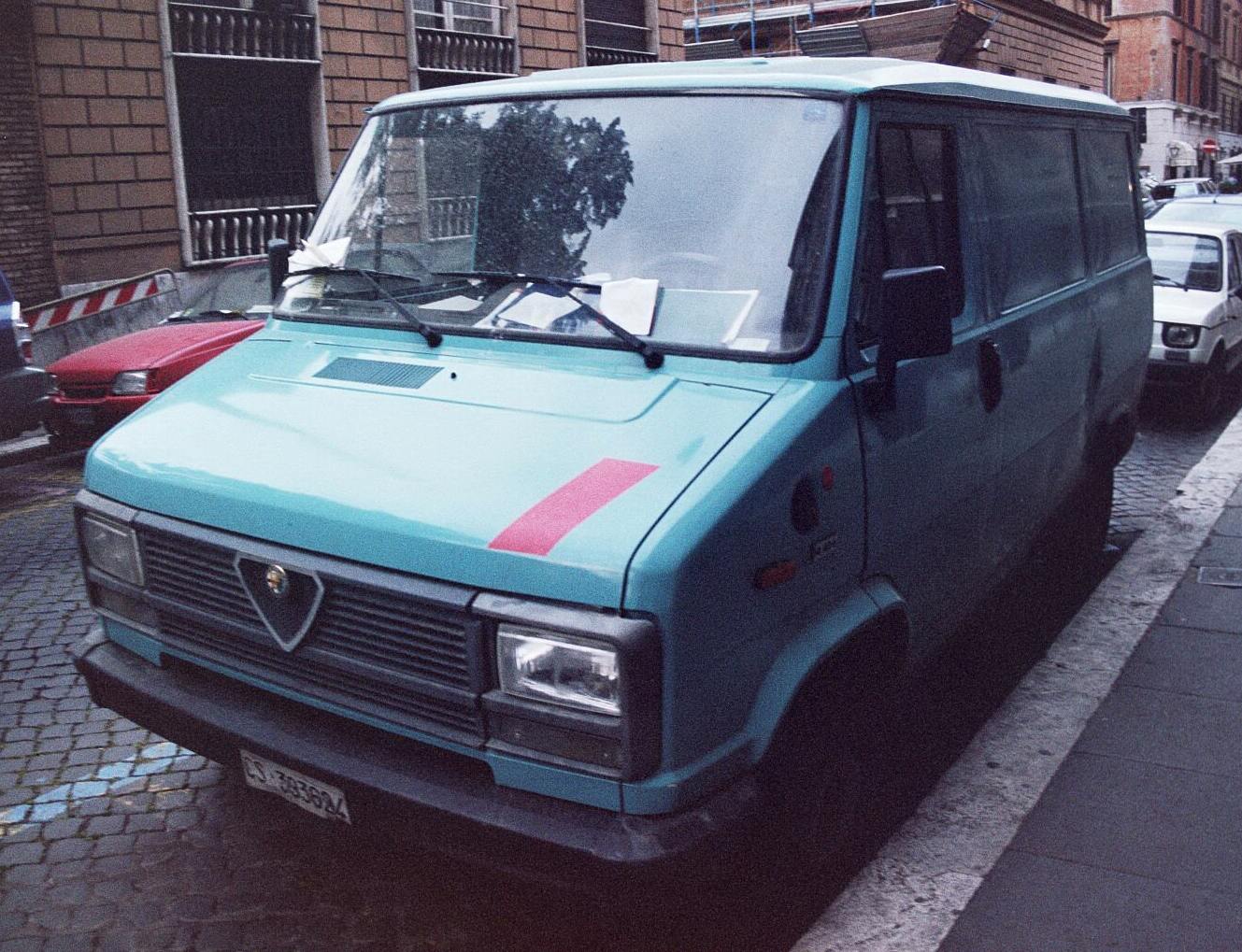
Alfa Romeo AR6.14

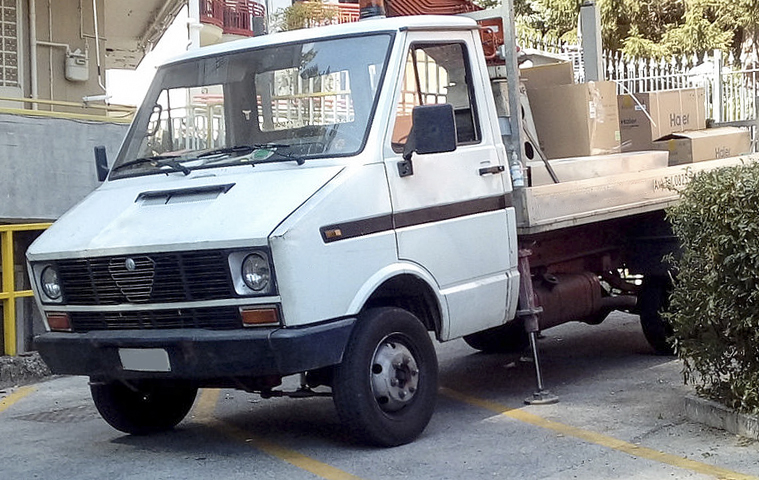
Alfa Romeo AR8

Some Fiat and Iveco models were also marketed as Alfa Romeos as replacements for Romeo Romeo vans. The AR8 was based on the first-generation Iveco Daily, and the AR6 was a rebadged first-generation Fiat Ducato. They both carried Alfa Romeo's traditional shield-shaped grille.
