= Nissan Trade =

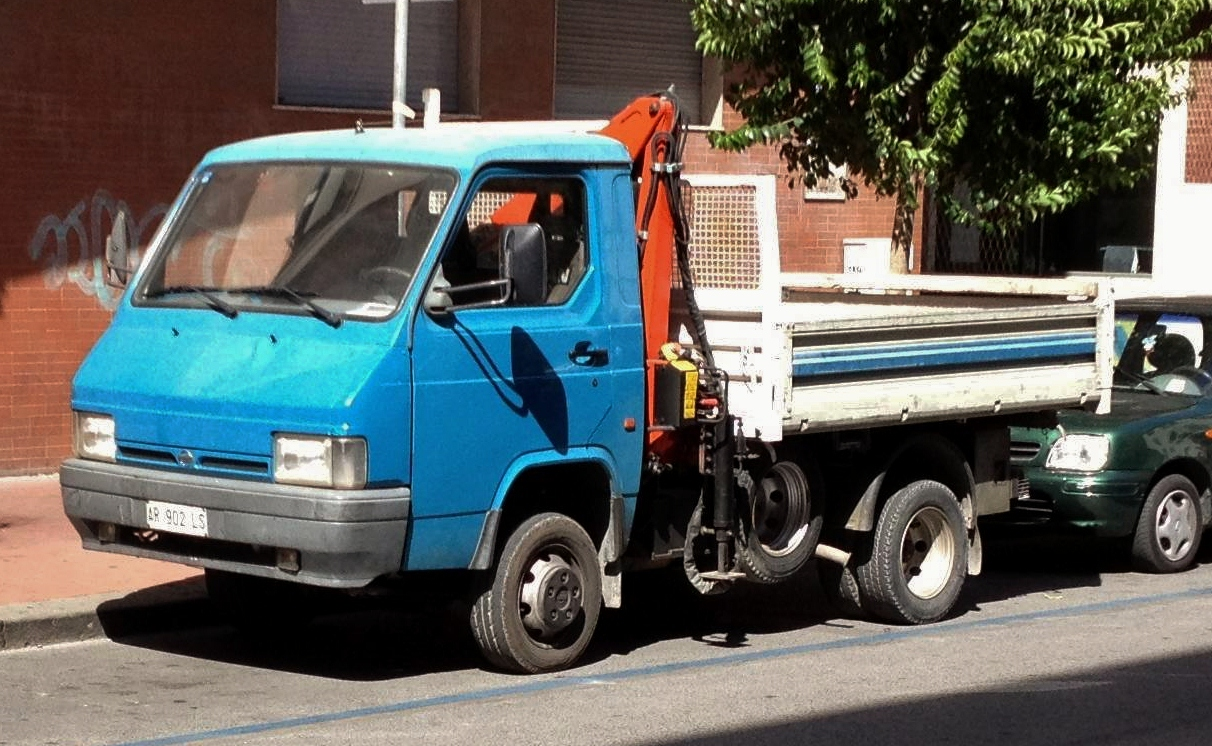
- 1994-2001 Nissan Trade truck

Overview
- Manufacturer: Avia; Ebro Motor Ibérica; Nissan Motor Ibérica
- Also called: Ebro Trade
- Production: Avia 1000/1250/2000: 1976-1984; Ebro F-series: 1976-1986; Nissan Trade: 1986-2001
- Assembly: Ávila, Spain

Body and chassis
- Class: Light commercial vehicle
- Body style: 4-door panel van 2/4-door chassis cab 2/4-door pickup truck
- Layout: Front engine, rear-wheel drive
- Related: Alfa Romeo F12

Powertrain
- Engine: diesel: 1.8 L Perkins 4.108 I4; 2.0 L LD20II I4; 2.5 L TD25 I4; 2.7 L Perkins 4.165 I4; 2.8 L A428 I4; 2.8 L RD28 I6; 3.0 L ZD30DD DI I4

Dimensions
- Length: 4,610 mm (181.5 in)-5,900 mm (232.3 in)
- Width: 1,955 mm (77.0 in)
- Height: 2,145 mm (84.4 in)

Chronology
- Predecessor: Ebro F108
- Successor: Nissan Interstar

The Nissan Trade is the most common name for a family of light commercial vehicles that was produced by Ebro Motor Ibérica from 1976 to 1986 and by Nissan Motor Ibérica from 1986 to 2001 in Spain. This truck was marketed only in Europe. It was a replacement for the Ebro F108, itself a rebadged Alfa Romeo Romeo van which was marketed exclusively in Spain. It was designed by AISA, owners of Avia, and originally marketed under both the Ebro and Avia brands. Avia was taken over by Ebro in 1977 and Nissan took a share of that company in 1979. Nissan took a majority stake in Ebro in 1982, and began phasing out the Avia brand. In 1985 the Ebro F-series went on sale in the UK, as the "Nissan Ebro Trade" (but only with Ebro badging). After a significant facelift in 1986 the Ebro nameplate was retired and the range was sold as the Nissan Trade.

== Ebro/Avia ==
The initial design was square and simple, with trapezoidal elements. The engines were Perkins diesels, license-built in Spain by Motor Ibérica (Ebro) themselves. Avia Vehicles, having been responsible for the design of the van, also assembled it in their own plant as the Avia 1000/1250/2000 (reflecting the cargo capacity). The nearly identical Ebro models were called the F260, F275, and F350. The initial design was based on the same chassis as the Ebro F108 vehicle, although it had different drivetrain and engine options. The only difference was the badging and the grille insert.

Heavy-duty versions had a rear-wheel-drive configuration, while lighter versions were front-wheel drive. The lighter-duty versions used the 1.8-litre Perkins 4.108 engine with 47 hp (35 kW), while the heavier F350 and Avia 2000 used the 2.7-litre, 65.5 hp (48 kW) 4.165 engine.

In 1984, the "JX" update programme was complete and a facelifted model with square headlights and extra black plastic was presented. This was also when the Avia name was discontinued. Nissan-built engines were also introduced, replacing the earlier Perkins units: a Japanese-designed, Spanish-built 2-litre diesel (the LD20II) with 58 hp (43 kW) or an updated, Nissan-built derivative of the old Perkins 4.165. Called the A428 it was bored out for a 2.8 L (2,820 cc) displacement and had a revised head – while still of a swirl chamber design, had a Nissan-designed throat, and power increased to 68 hp (50 kW). A 2-litre, petrol-engined version was also offered in some continental European markets. The JX programme included the development of a right-hand drive model for the British market, where a Spanish-made truck could evade quota limitations on imports of Japanese-made vehicles. In the United Kingdom, the only engine initially available was the LD20II. While considered underpowered by period testers, the importers could not fit the heavier 2.8-litre diesel due the need to keep the weight below the 1,525 kg (3,362 lb) threshold - above this, more stringent MOT testing requirements and the need for a goods vehicle operator's licence applied. This model was sold by Nissan as the Ebro Trade in the UK, with Ebro badging inside and out, but with the Nissan name appearing in adverts and often used in the press.

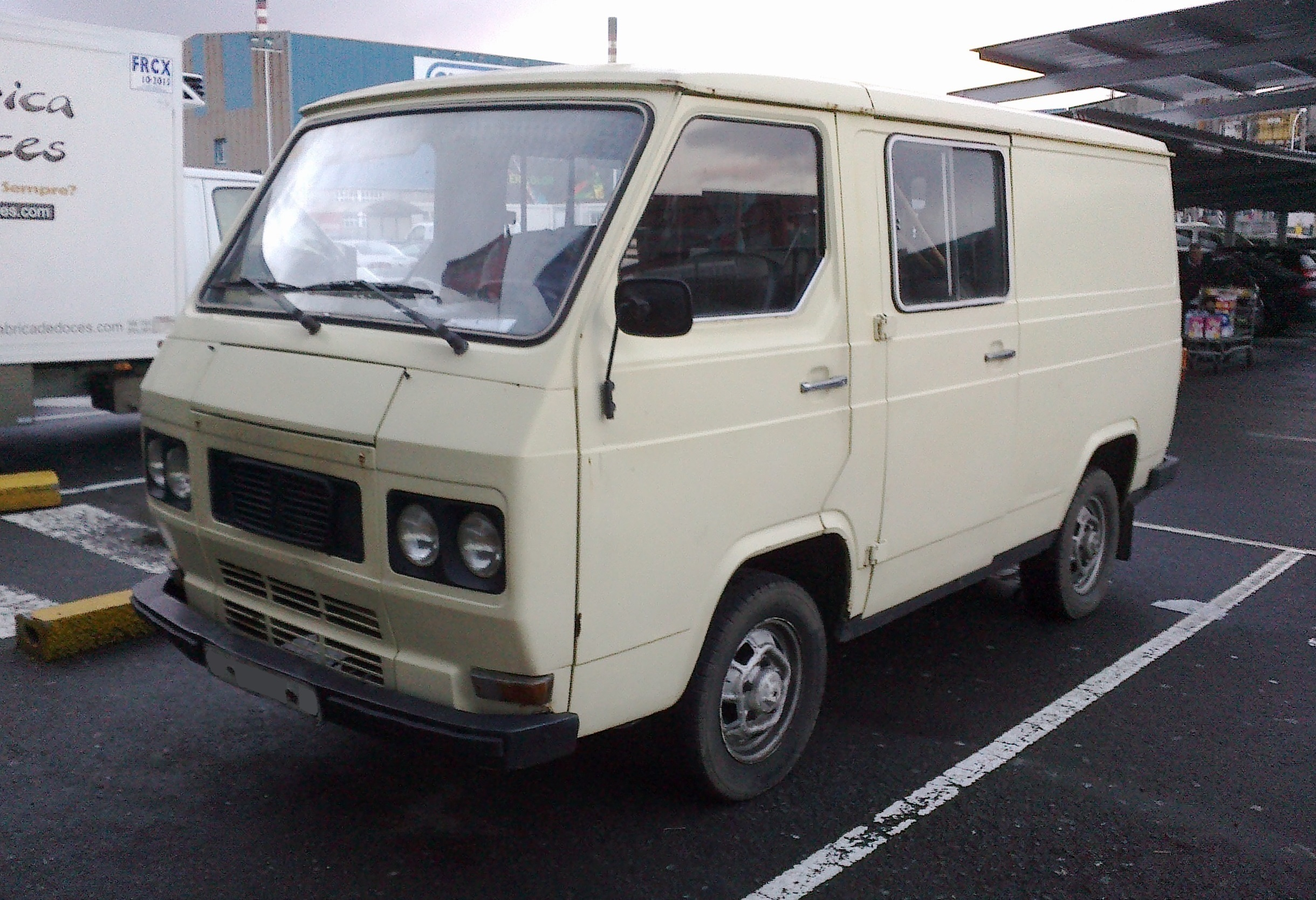
The original, 1976 design - here a 1980 Avia

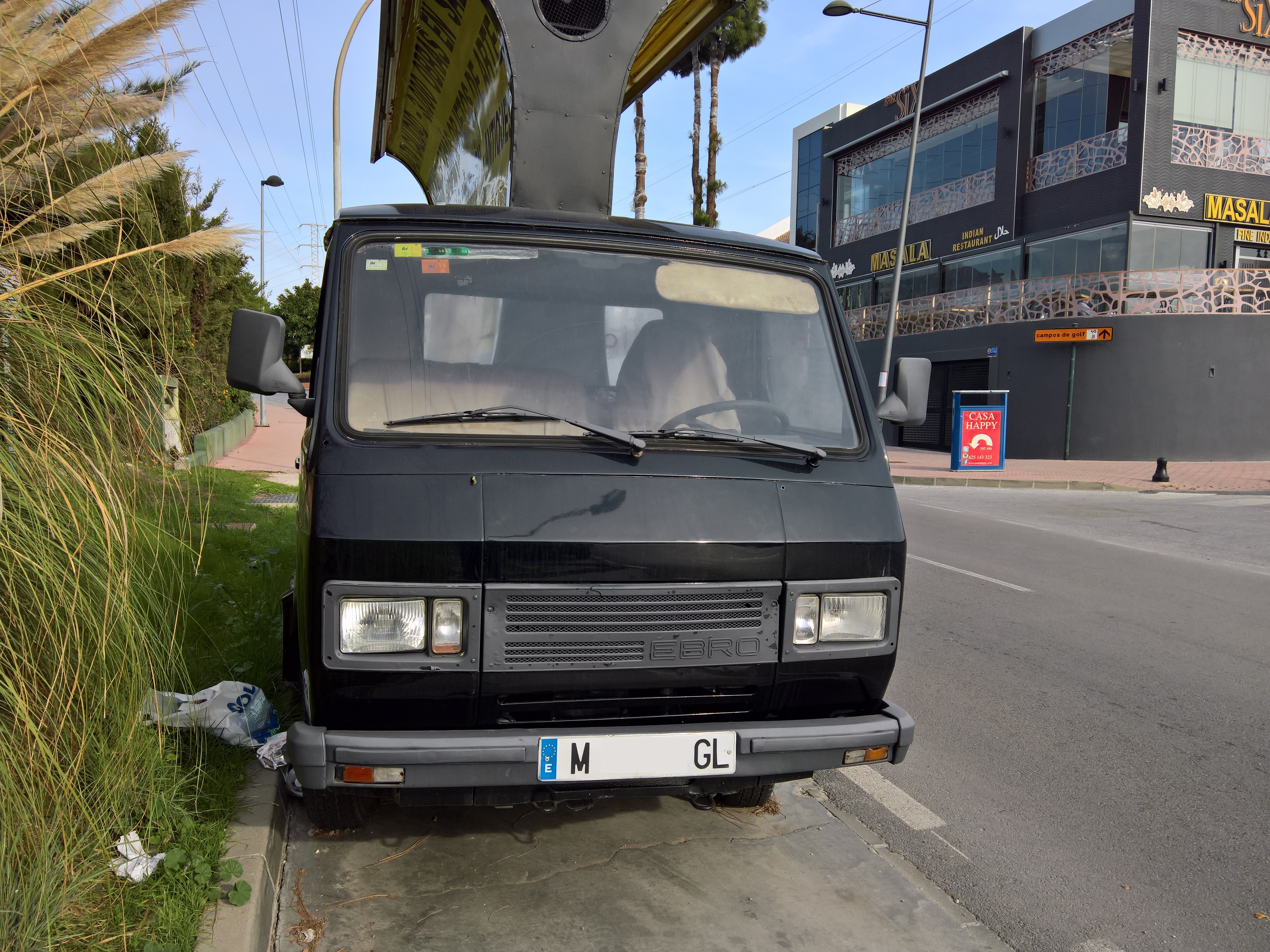
The facelifted 1984 design (1985 Ebro F-series)

== Nissan Trade (PF) ==
The JX Trade had a short life as the design was thoroughly updated again in 1986. Given the code name PF, the modernization programme included updated engines (the LD20II E and the A428II), a more comfortable interior, and a new, extended front with a geometric look and wraparound turn signals. The Ebro name was retired in most places, although it remained in use in some places such as Andorra. It was available in both van and chassis cab forms, although the van variants were mostly available to Spain, with the chassis cabs being exported. There was also a Trade Van version, which had an even simpler equipment and had swing-leaf side doors, instead of sliding doors. There was also a fully glazed, nine-seater minibus called the Trade Combi, and the high-roofed Trade Largo.

The Trade received a light facelift yet again in December 1989, with changes to the character line and with the front Nissan text now mounted to the right rather than being centered. Rust proofing was improved, seat fabrics were new, and the Trade finally received a single key for locks and ignition. The rear suspension was also reworked, although only for the heavier, 2.8-litre models, the steering box redesigned, and the equipment levels were adjusted.

In 1991 it was time for a more thorough facelift, called the TC, executed by Spanish industrial designer Francisco Podadera of Podadera Design. This included a more conventional front treatment with larger, clear, wraparound headlamps incorporating the turn signals and a more modern interior. However, due to its outdated design and equipment (it did not have airbags and ABS in the 1990s), the Trade was not a strong seller in most European export markets; aside from Spain, most Trades were sold in Italy, which also had significant trade barriers against Japanese-made vehicles. It did not offer contemporary comfort or a large number of standard features; power steering was available as an option.

In 1993, a version with a 2.8-liter 86 hp RD28 naturally aspirated became optional. During this time Nissan entered a joint venture with Renault to produce the Renault Master, under the name Nissan Interstar, as a replacement for the Nissan Trade, but due to its popularity in some markets, the Trade models were produced until 2001.

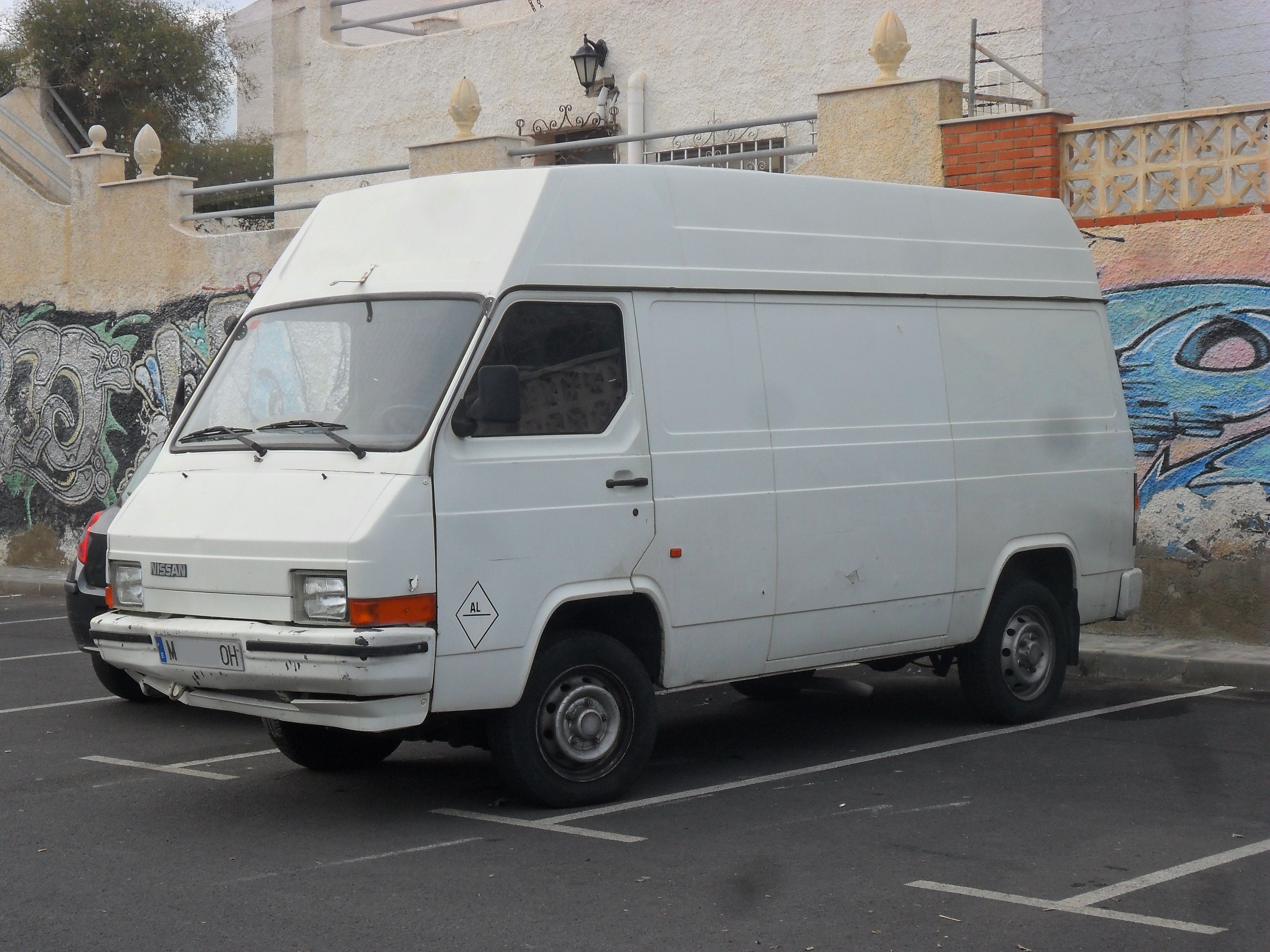
The lightly facelifted Nissan Trade (Largo high roof; 1989-1992)

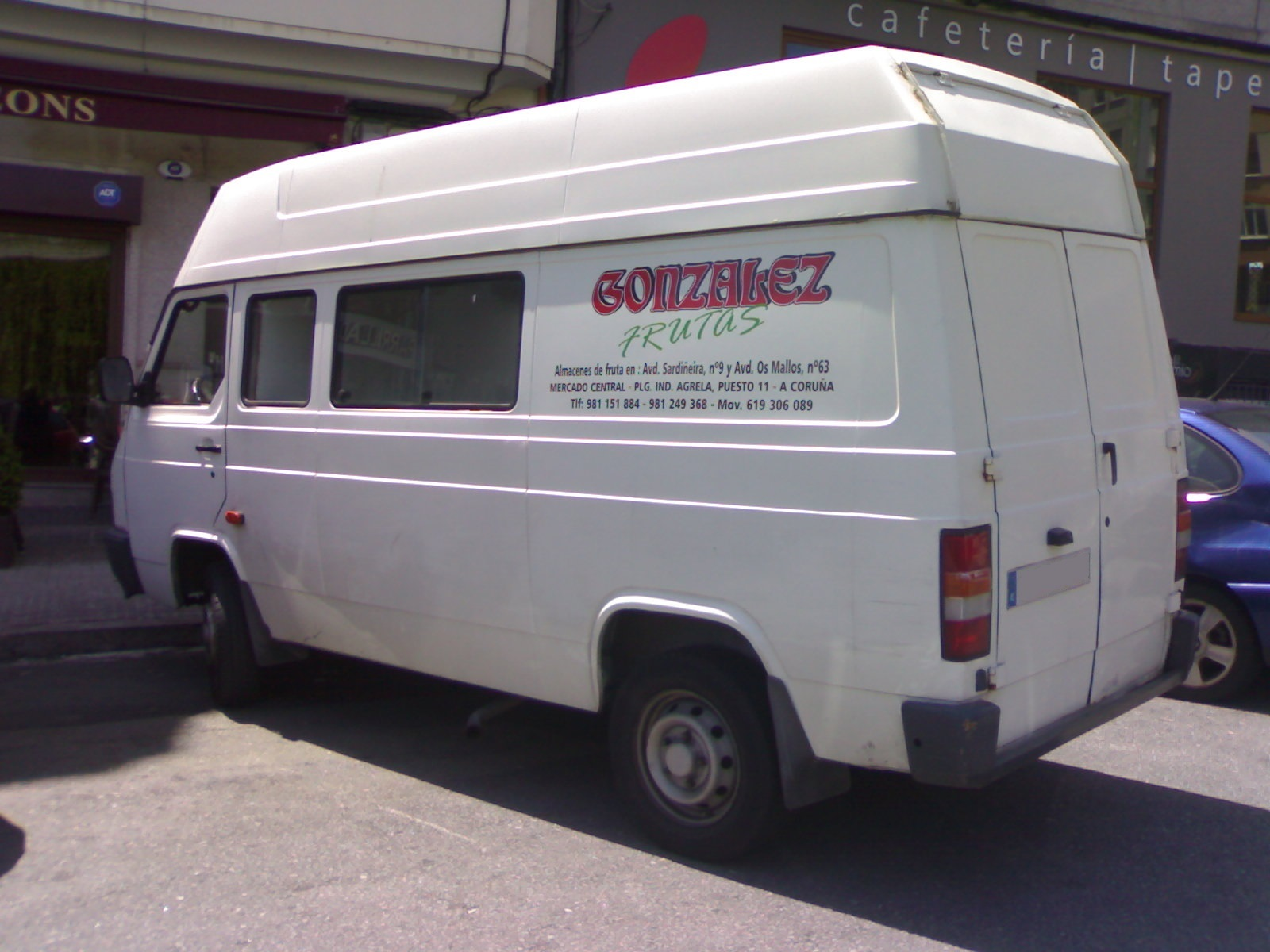
The longer wheelbase Nissan Trade Largo received an extra side window behind the front door

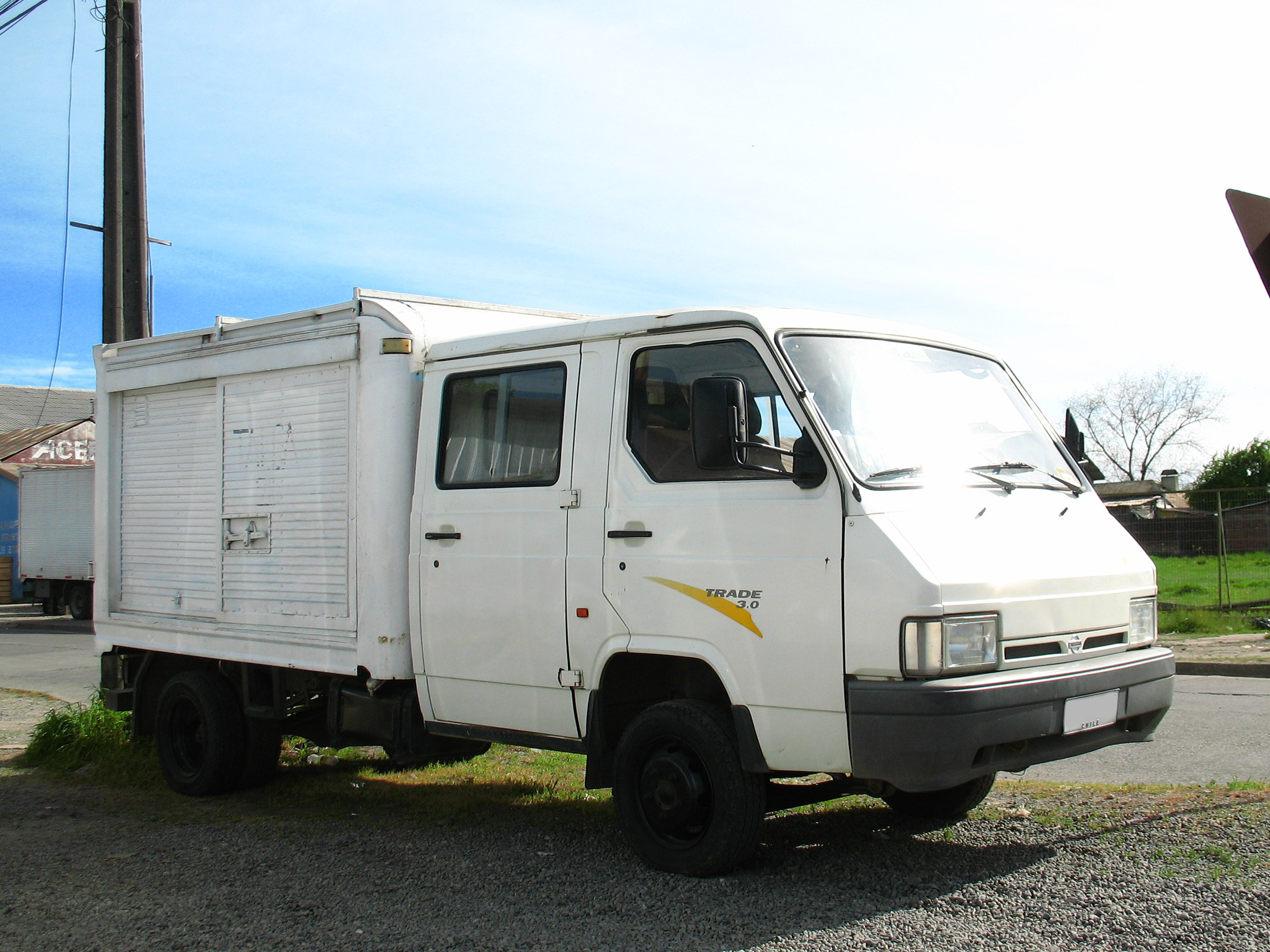
A later (1996) Trade 3.0 Crew Cab
