= Avia Vehicles =

Avia was the brand name under which the commercial vehicles built by Aeronáutica Industrial S.A. (AISA) a company that was founded in Madrid in 1956, originally as an aircraft repairing organization, later started to manufacture their own new light vans and FC pickup trucks. However they were taken over in 1970 by another Spanish large manufacturer called EBRO Motor Iberica based in industrial Barcelona. From 1970 on, all vehicles were renamed and known as AVIA-Ebro employing modern engineering and new mechanicals.

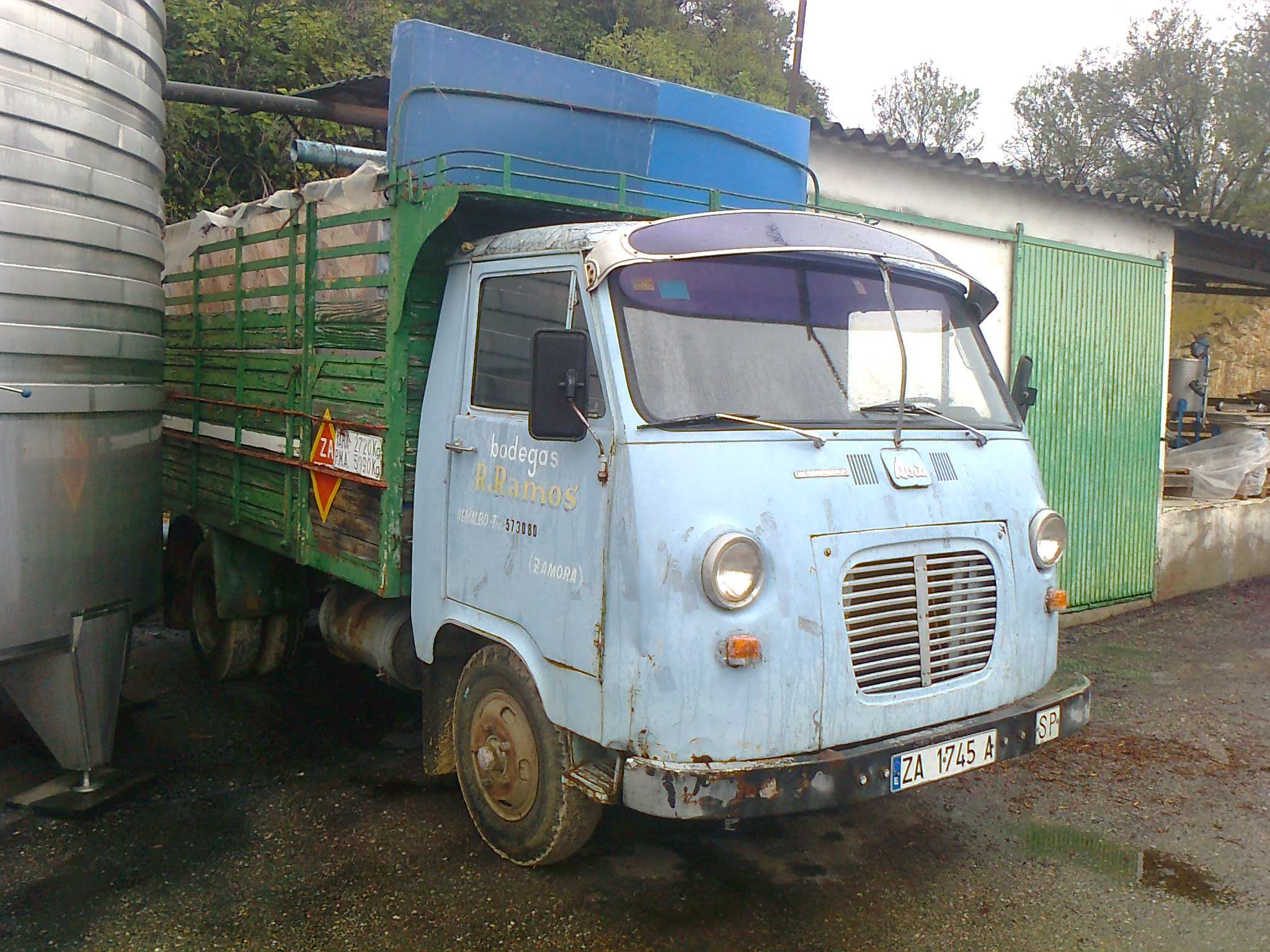
Avia 4000L (year 1972)

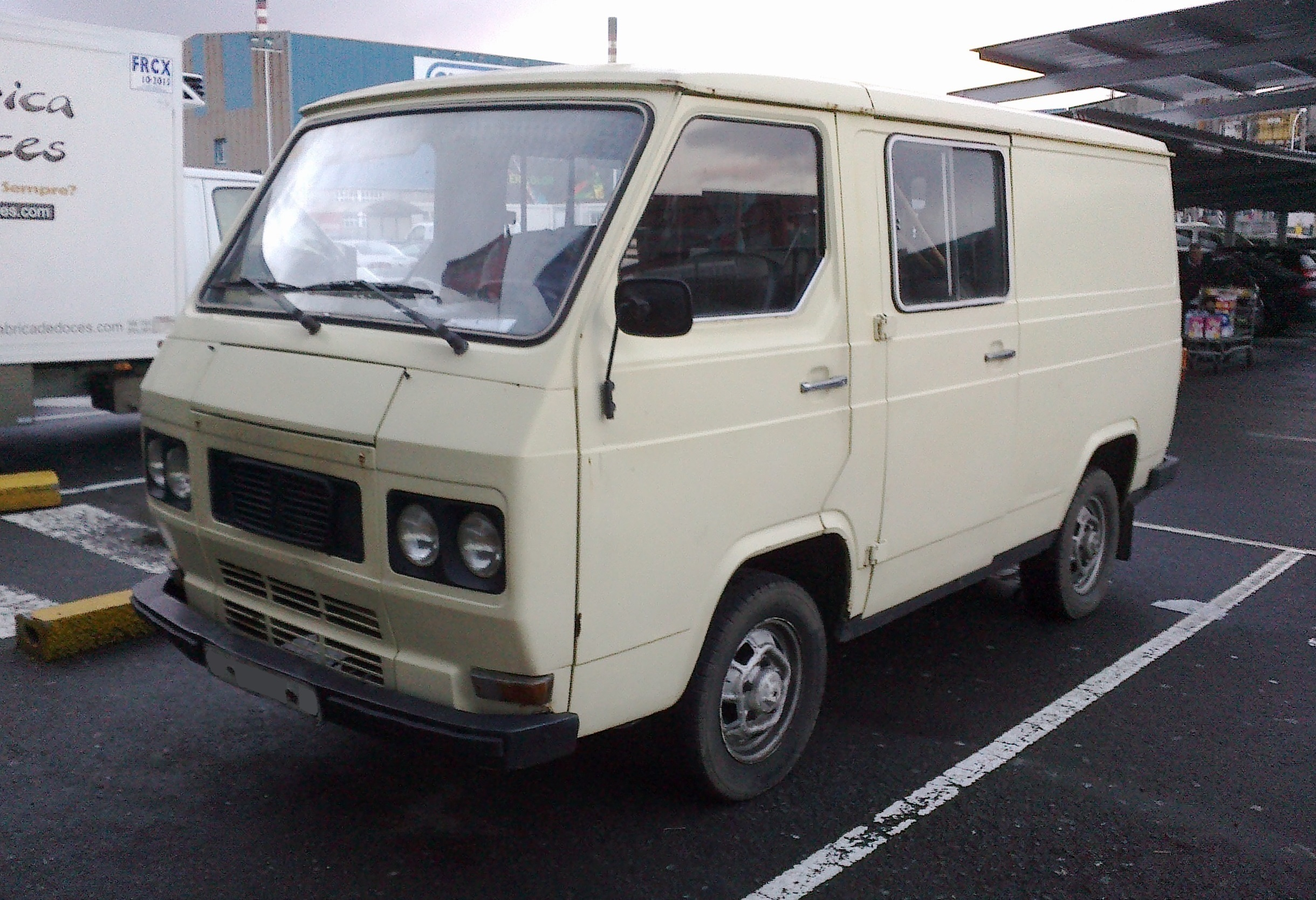
This model, sold as 1000, 1250 and 2000, was identical to Ebro F260, F275 and F350.

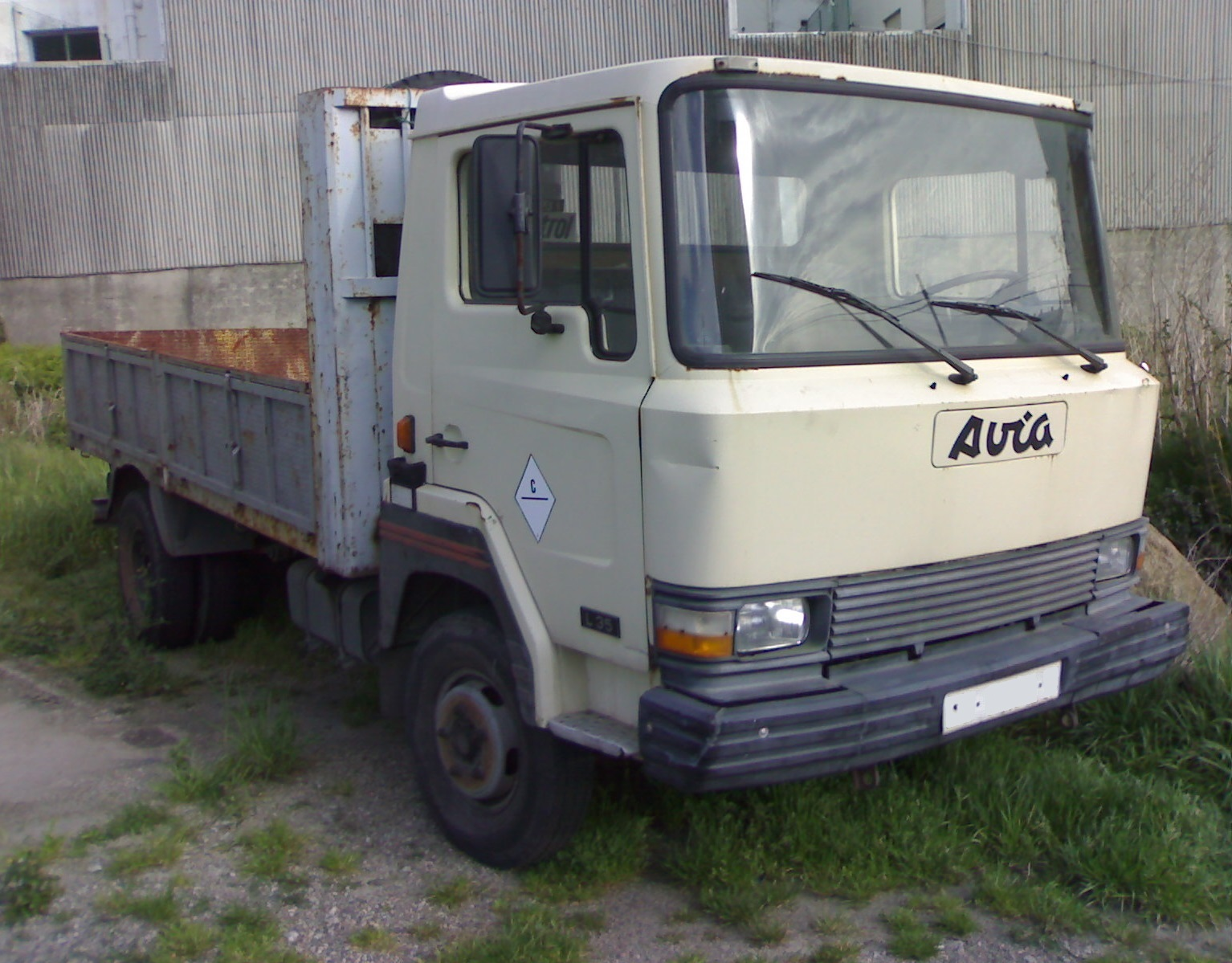
Truck Avia L35. Identical to Ebro series L and M.

AISA had been primarily a maker of light aircraft, but in the late 50s switched, with some success, to producing road vehicles. Those were mainly light vans, trucks and buses using Perkins Hispania diesel engines. They launched their first four wheeled truck within the 1500 KG to 11000 KG gross weight categories. Also available was an 18-28-seater bus/coach model, both of which were part of the model range in the 1950s and 1960s.

One of the most interesting applications of Avia trucks was the Klöckner Humboldt Deutz Spanish subsidiary designed Avia-Deutz firefighting engine. Based on an Avia 3500L chassis-cab, it featured an air-cooled Deutz engine equipped with German Magirus firefighting equipment.

In the early 70s, AISA was taken over by its main competitor Motor Iberica, manufacturer of the Ebro range of commercial vehicles, and gradually Avia vehicles became little more than badge engineered Ebros. All new models were now called AVIA-EBRO. When Nissan Motors of Japan took over Motor Iberica in the 1980s, the Avia brand name had disappeared. Several AVIA-EBRO 3500L Diesel models are still in daily use and can be occasionally spotted in Spain, normally employed in agriculture and industrial activities. Both AVIA and AVIA-EBRO brands are still in use.

Avia trucks were used by the Spanish Armed Police in their anti-riot operations.
