= Antonio Sagardía Ramos =

Spanish military officer (1880–1962)

General Antonio Sagardía Ramos
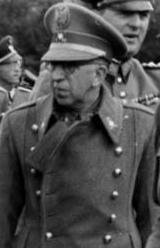
- Antonio Sagardía Ramos during a visit to the headquarters of the LSSAH in Berlin-Lichterfelde, September 1940
- Born: Antonio Sagardía Ramos; 5 September 1879; Zaragoza, Aragon, Kingdom of Spain
- Died: 11 January 1962 (aged 82); Madrid, Francoist Spain
- Military career
- Allegiance: Kingdom of Spain; Nationalist faction Nationalist Spain
- Branch: Spanish Army
- Rank: General of the artillery
- Nickname: Butcher of Pallars
- Commands: Military Governor of Cartagena
- Conflicts: Spanish Civil War
- Other work: Inspector General of the Policía Armada

Antonio Sagardía Ramos (Zaragoza, 5 September 1879 – Madrid, 11 January 1962) was a Spanish military officer and war criminal who fought for the Nationalist faction in the Spanish Civil War. He became known as the "Butcher of Pallars" (carnicero de Pallars) because of the massacre committed under his command in Pallars Sobirà.

== Biography ==
Sagardía Ramos was born in the Aragonese capital of Zaragoza, in a Basque–Navarre family. He joined the Spanish Army from a young age and in 1921 he rose to the rank of colonel. After the proclamation of the Second Spanish Republic in 1931, he accepted the military reform of Manuel Azaña (Azaña Law) and retired from the Army.

=== Role in the Spanish Civil War ===
Once the Spanish Civil War began following the Spanish coup of July 1936, Sagardía Ramos was called by one of the rebel leaders, General Emilio Mola, to rejoin the Army. He immediately commanded a unit of Falangist volunteers with whom he intervened in the Campaign of Gipuzkoa.

In August and September 1937, Sagardía Ramos took part in the War in the North and participated in the Battle of Santander, at the head of the so-called "Sagardía Column"; the unit exercised a harsh repression against the civilians and soldiers of the Republican faction, including numerous extrajudicial killings. After the War in the North ended, the "Sagardía Column" was reorganized as the 62nd Division of the Navarre Army Corps, at the head of which he took part in the Aragon Offensive. In April 1938, Sagardía's troops were deployed in the Battle of the Segre, in which they hardly encountered any resistance. But in the face of casualties suffered by his column after a Republican attack, he said:

I will shoot ten Catalans for every dead man in my guard."

In May 1938, several extrajudicial killings took place that ravaged the Catalan comarca of Pallars Sobirà and resulted in 67 people shot, good part of them women, elderly and children. In January 1939, Sagardía Ramos participated in the Catalonia Offensive. A few weeks later he participated in the so-called "final offensive" of the war, and on 30 March he entered Alcalá de Henares at the head of his unit.

=== Post-war career ===
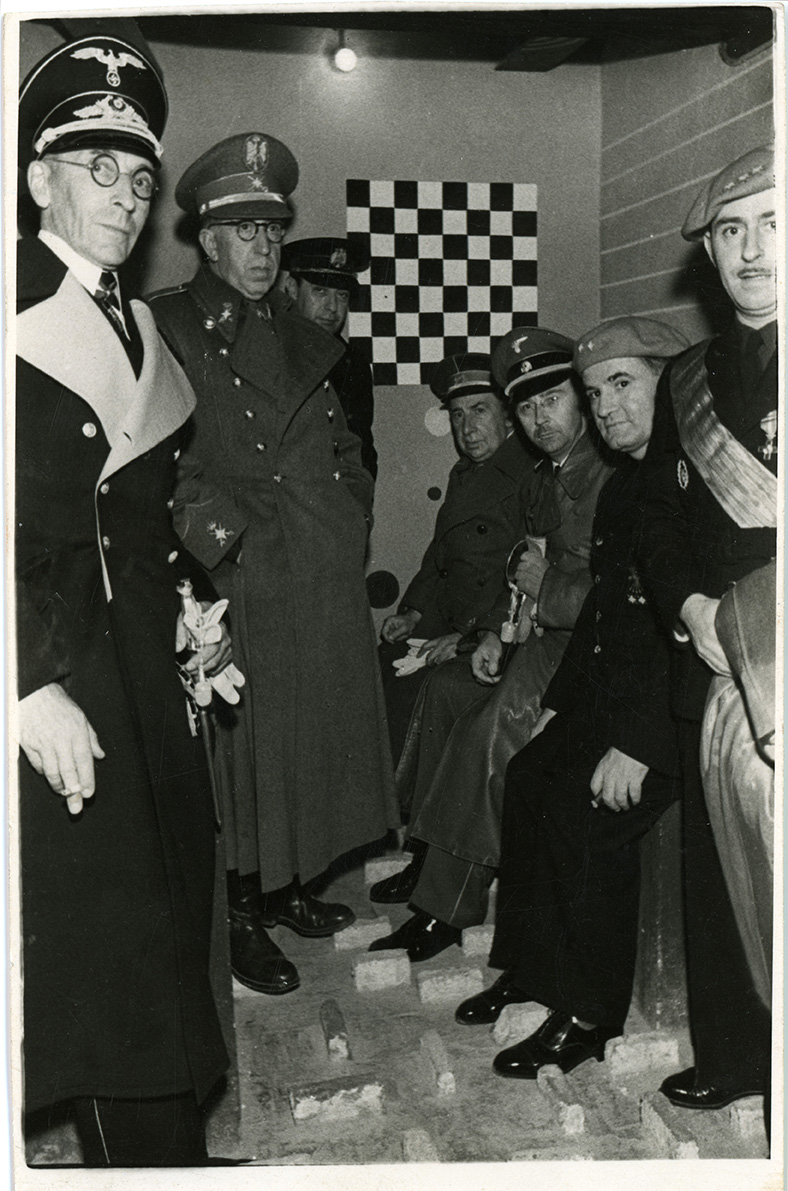
Sagardía Ramos (second from left) and Himmler (third from right) visiting a checa in Barcelona, 23 October 1940.

After the Civil War ended, he was appointed Inspector General of the new Policía Armada, and as such he was part of the delegation that visited Nazi Germany in September 1940. The following month, he was one of the personalities that received Reichsführer-SS Heinrich Himmler in San Sebastián, during his visit to Spain.

He subsequently served as military governor of Cartagena.

== Bibliography ==
- (in Spanish) — (1940). Del Alto Ebro a las fuentes del Llobregat. Treinta y dos meses de guerra de la 62 División.
