= Sanglas =

Motorcycle Manufacturer

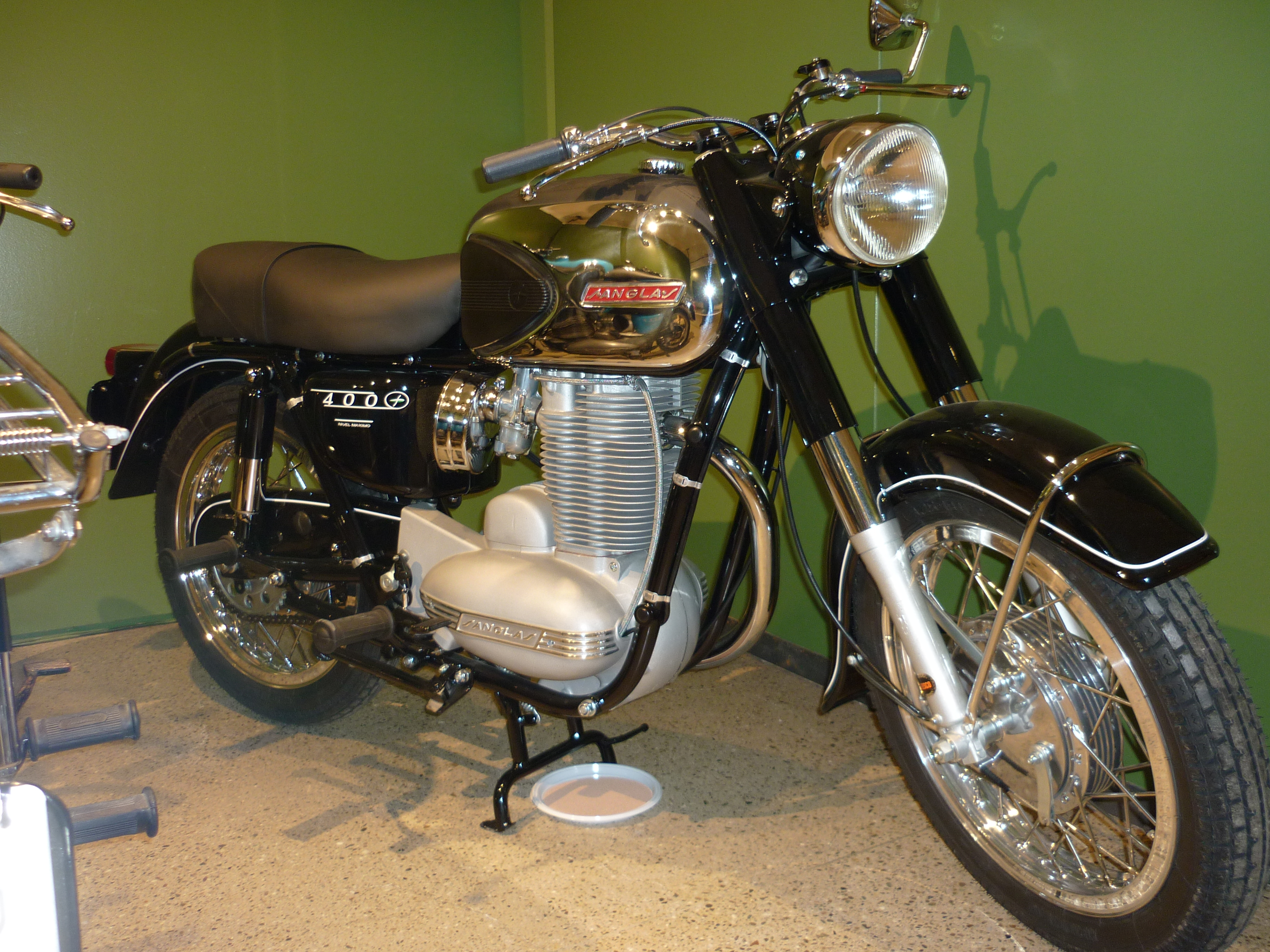
- The Sanglas 400 (1972)
- Type: Private company
- Industry: Automotive industry
- Founded: 1942; 84 years ago
- Founders: Javier and Martin Sanglas
- Defunct: 1981
- Fate: Take over by Japanese company
- Successor: Yamaha Motor Company
- Headquarters: Barcelona, Spain
- Area served: Spain
- Products: Motorbikes
- Number of employees: 100+ (1960s)

Sanglas was a Spanish motorcycle manufacturer which was founded in Barcelona (Poble Nou) in 1942 and ceased production in 1981.

Sanglas motorcycles had relatively large engines for their time, especially for Spain. The company was born with the intention of positioning itself as an alternative to brands like BMW, Zündapp or DKW to provide motor vehicles to official agencies.

== History ==
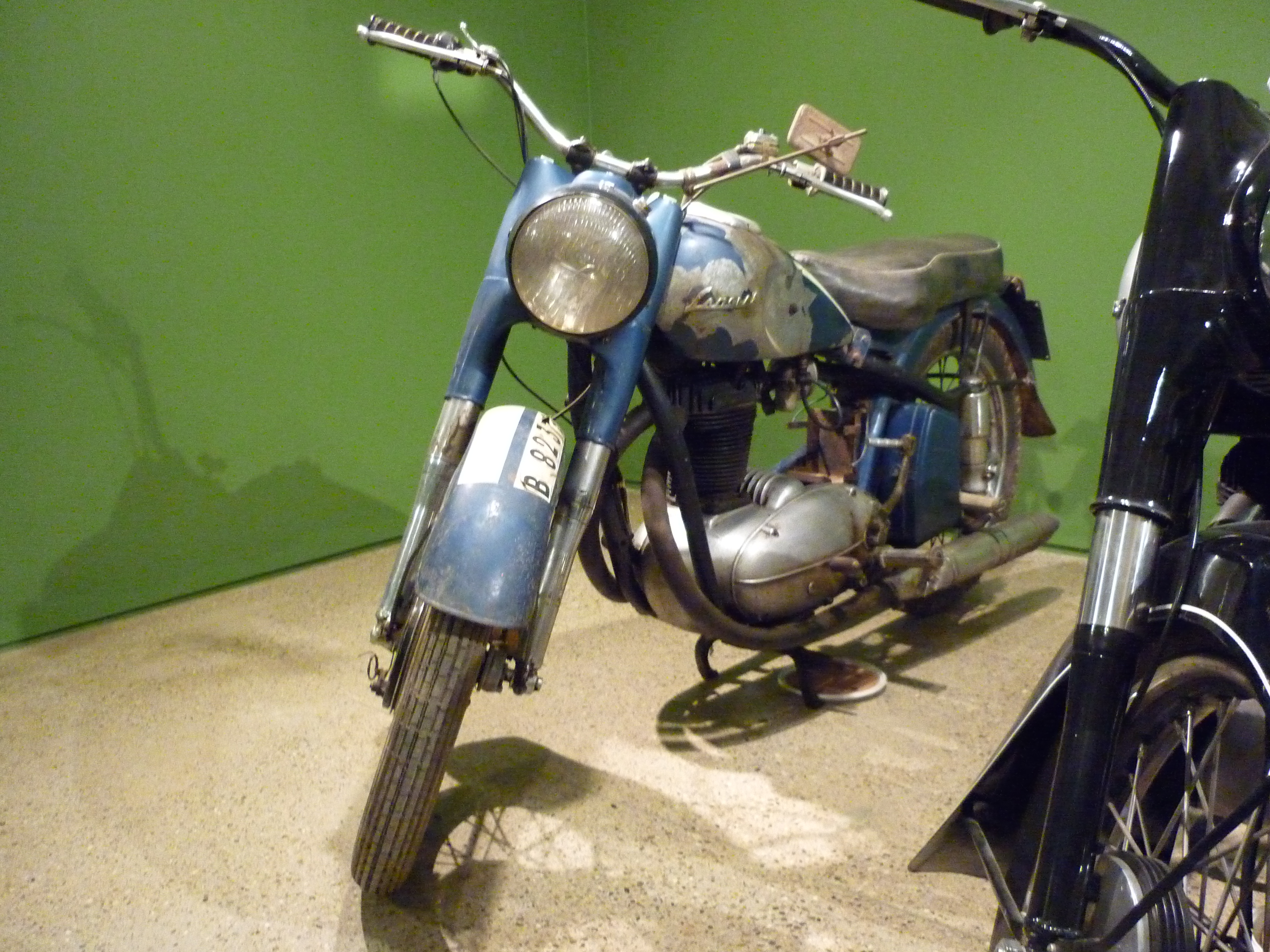
Sanglas 350 (1945)

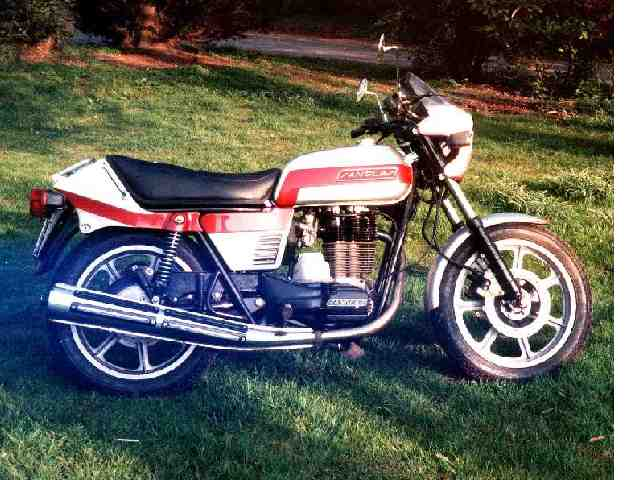
Sanglas 500 S2 V5

The history of the brand dates back to 1942, three years after the Spanish Civil War, but the first documents on the formal sale of motorcycles dating from 1947. It was founded by two young students of engineering of Barcelone, brothers Javier and Martin Sanglas with financial back up by their father, a textile entrepreneur.

Sanglas models were a hybrid of English and German models. The chassis was based on the concept of BMW and the engine, 4-stroke single cylinder, OHV type, was inspired by the DKW brand. The first motorcycle had a displacement of 347,75 cc. and 14.4 HP power at 4,800 rpm. At the end of 1948 the company already had 100 employees and had manufactured 200 units. The first model, 500 cc with a rear frame revised to accommodate a swinging arm with two spring/hydraulic damper units, was launched in October 1952.

The Sanglas were designed as touring machines, could reach considerable speeds and able to travel long distances. 350/4 and 500/3 models included engines with increased power, an improved silencer and light alloy brake drums among other improvements. However, the Seat 600 car, only marginally more expensive than the Sanglas, reduced the market for the latter. In 1957 a sidecar made in fiberglass was presented at the Barcelona Fair. At the same time, a substantially improved version of the mountain model, the Montaña II, was introduced, having increased torque and power (25 hp).

In 1958 the annual production reached 500 units; this led to a transfer from Poble Nou to a more modern factory located in El Hospitalet. During the financial and political crises of those years, the staff level was reduced from 200 to 50 with many of the components being outsourced; for example, the new Sanglas 400 engine was a British unit (Villiers 250cc 2-strokw) branded as "Rovena".

At the end of the 1950s, due to the dominance of four-wheeled vehicles, many motorcycle manufacturers were forced to reduce the engine displacement of their models. Sanglas introduced the “Chromática” with 295 cc engine and 13 HP power at 6,000 rpm. In 1959 480 units were sold, 250 to public agencies and 230 to individual clients. The Chromática nickname arose from the four colors (blue, salmon, green and black) with which it was supplied.

A 500 cc model was launched in 1967 and intended for military use, but did not receive much demand. That year, Sanglas launched the brand Rovena, with two-stroke two-cylinder Hispano Villiers engines and capacity of 250/350 cc (the latter since 1963). Production of the Sanglas with two-stroke Zündapp engines of 50, 75 and 100cc began in 1964. Four-stroke engine model 400T (423 cc, already designed in 1956–57) was presented at the Fair of Barcelone. This model would serve as a reference for the rest of the line-up of the brand until its demise.

At the end of the 1960s the production reached 2,500 units, with 40 workers on the assembly line, from a total workforce of less than 100 people.

In 1970, a folding multi-use model of 49 cc, low-maintenance secondary transmission by cardan and only 28 kg of weight is designed, but lacking funds for production, the project was dismissed.

By 1973 the demand for motorcycles of great size and power had increased, but Sanglas manages to sell only 474 units because of their lack of performance. In 1976 the model 500S is presented, with onboard (Sanglas concept) disc brakes and 32 HP at 6,700 rpm. At the same time, the 400E model was stepped to become the 400F. The 500S model allows an increase in sales abroad with the financial help of the Prodinsa company, which also owned shares in the company Mototrans (manufacturer under license from the Italian brand Ducati motorcycles), which led attempts to merge both companies.

In 1977, the 500 S2 is launched, and two years later a version with five-speed gearbox (the 500 S2 V5) appears on the market. The business never made profitable the Prodinsa investment and the brand Sanglas is sold to the Spanish bank Banesto, with the idea of achieving capital gains from the sale of the company to some Japanese manufacturer, seeking for a local partner to penetrate the Spanish market. Finally, in 1981 the SEMSA company is created, with participation of Yamaha, Banesto, Bank of Madrid and Catalan Development Bank. 50% of the capital was originally in the hands of Yamaha that, through several capital increases, achieved total control over the company.

The last Sanglas with own engine, the 500 S2 V5, was discontinued in 1981. The production of the 400Y ceased in 1982, thus disappearing Sanglas name and the last of their products. From that moment only the Yamaha brand motorcycles would be produced. In 1989 the firm SEMSA disappears and Yamaha engine Spain, S.A. is constituted.

=== List of models produced ===
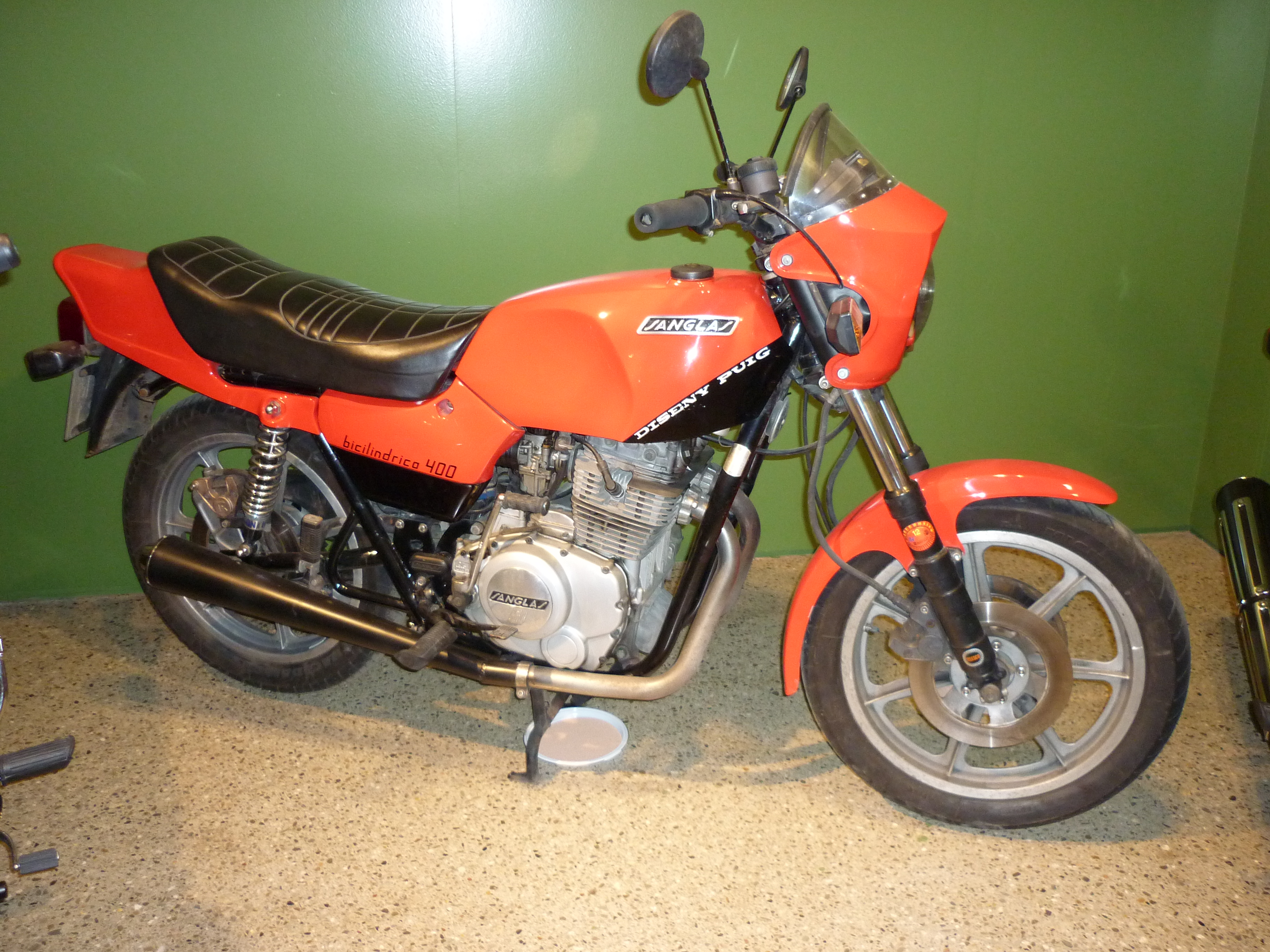
Sanglas 400Y, last model built

Model produced	From	Until
350	1945	1947
350/A	1948	1949
350/1	1949	1951
500/1	1952	1953
350/2	1952	1953
350/3 y 500/2	1953	1956
350/4 y 500/3	1956	1962
350/4/2	1962	1964
295 (Cromática)	1959	1961
295/1	1961	1969
400	1964	1973
Rovena 250 y 325	1962	1970
400 T	1971	1973
400	1964	1968
100 Sport	1964	1968
50 Ciclomotor	1964	1968
400 E	1973	1976
400 F	1976	1980
500 S	1976	1978
500 S2	1978	1979
500 S2 V5	1979	1981
400 Y	1978	1982
