= Ebro trucks =

Spanish vehicle brand

Ebro (Motor Ibérica SA)
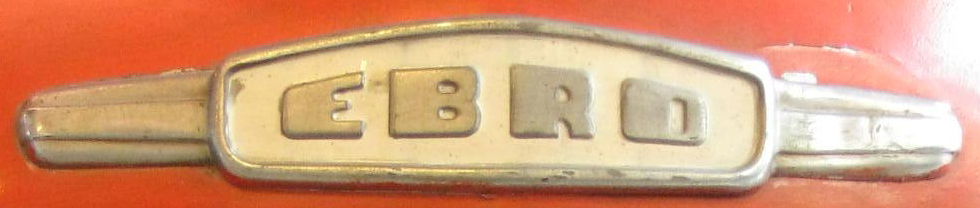
- Ebro Logo in 1960s
- Industry: Automotive
- Predecessors: Ford Motor Ibérica
- Founded: 1954; 72 years ago
- Defunct: 1987
- Fate: absorbed into Nissan Motor Ibérica
- Headquarters: Barcelona, Catalonia, Spain
- Products: Vehicles, tractors

Ebro trucks was a Spanish brand of light and medium trucks and buses, as well as all-wheel-drive utility vehicles with plants located in Barcelona, Madrid, Ávila, and Cordoba.

== History ==
Ebro trucks's parent company, Motor Ibérica, was set up in 1954 to build original British-designed Ford trucks based on Ford's Thames Trader ET4 4X2 and ET6 6X4 models under license using the name EBRO during the 1950s and 1960s.

=== 1960s−1970s ===
During the late-1960s and early-1970s, the company took over four Spanish light vehicle makers: Fadisa, (Alfa Romeo Romeo vans), Aisa (Avia trucks), Siata (SEAT car derived minivans), and Viasa (various Jeep 4x4s and Forward Control utility vehicles). It also took over the Spanish branch of Perkins engines.

This resulted in a real frenzy of badge engineering, as one could see Avia-badged Jeeps, Ebro-badged Alfa-Romeos, and so on. Meanwhile, Ebro introduced tilt-cab Ford 'D'-Series derived models for loads of between l'/2 and 7 tons and gradually added new models until the range covered 2- and 3-axle rigids and articulated types from 3 to 27 tons capacity.

Ebro also entered the agricultural tractor market through a license agreement with Massey Ferguson, which eventually led to the later becoming the controlling shareholder in Motor Ibérica.

=== 1980s ===
In the 1980s, Ebro launched the 'E'-Series trucks range, comprising some six models from 3,500 to 11,200 kg gross, and the 'P'-Series for gross weights of 13,000 to 27,000 kg. The lighter Avia range also continued in production.

In 1979 Nissan Motors (not Nissan Diesel, the truck subsidiary) had taken a 34% stake in Motor Ibérica, which by the autumn of 1982 had increased to 53%.

Nissan then took complete control in 1987, following Spain's accession to the EEC. From then on the company was named Nissan Motor Ibérica. During a short period, Japanese Kubota tractors were assembled and marketed in Spain as Ebro-Kubota.

Following the Nissan takeover, a "badge slide" from Ebro to Nissan took place. This was not without surprising occurrences, such as Ebro-badged Nissan Patrols that were sold in some European countries. The Ebro light commercial range became the Nissan Trade. During the 1980s and 1990s Ebro produced the Ebro Nissan Vanette panel vans and the Ebro Nissan Patrol 4X4. Today, the Ebro name has been fully dropped and the current commercial range consists of the Nissan Cabstar and the Nissan Atleon.

=== 2020s ===
Currently, Spanish Nissan are manufacturing the Cabstar light truck range and the Atleon heavy trucks range at their Nissan Motors Avila plant.

In 2021 the Ebro trademark was acquired by the Spanish company EV Motors. At the 2023 Barcelona Auto Show, the Spanish company Ebro announced the revival of the brand after thirty-six years out of the market. It is returning with a 100% electric pickup truck (based on the old Nissan Navara chassis and design) that will be available for sale starting in 2025.

In 2023, a joint venture was signed between EV Motors and the Chinese company Chery Automobile for the assembly of Ebro-branded Chery models at the Barcelona plant, to be marketed in Spain and some European markets. In november 2024, assembly (via CKD) of the Chery Tiggo 7 and Tiggo 8 models began; the two models were renamed Ebro S700 and Ebro S800.

== Gallery ==
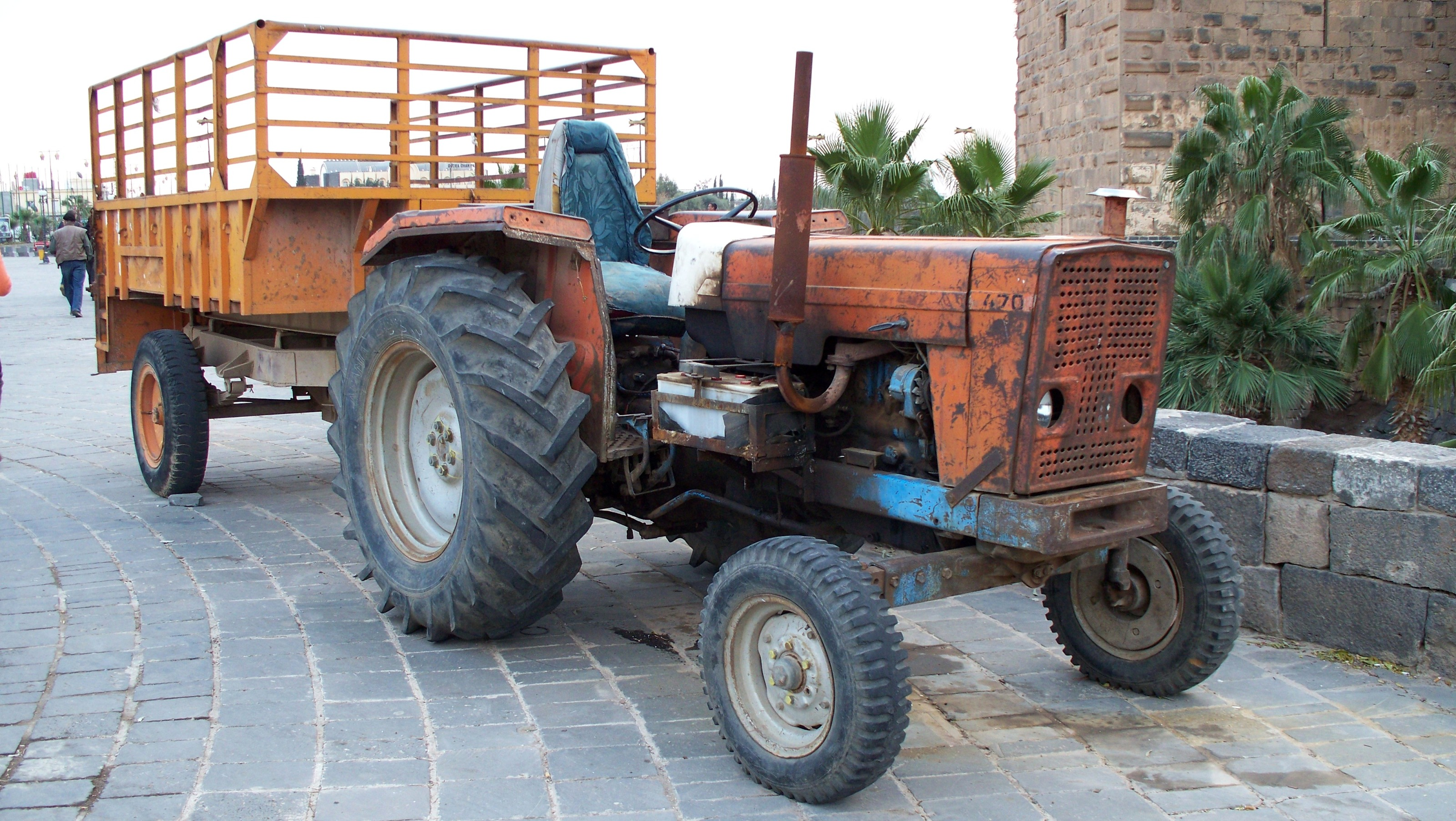
Ebro 470 tractor

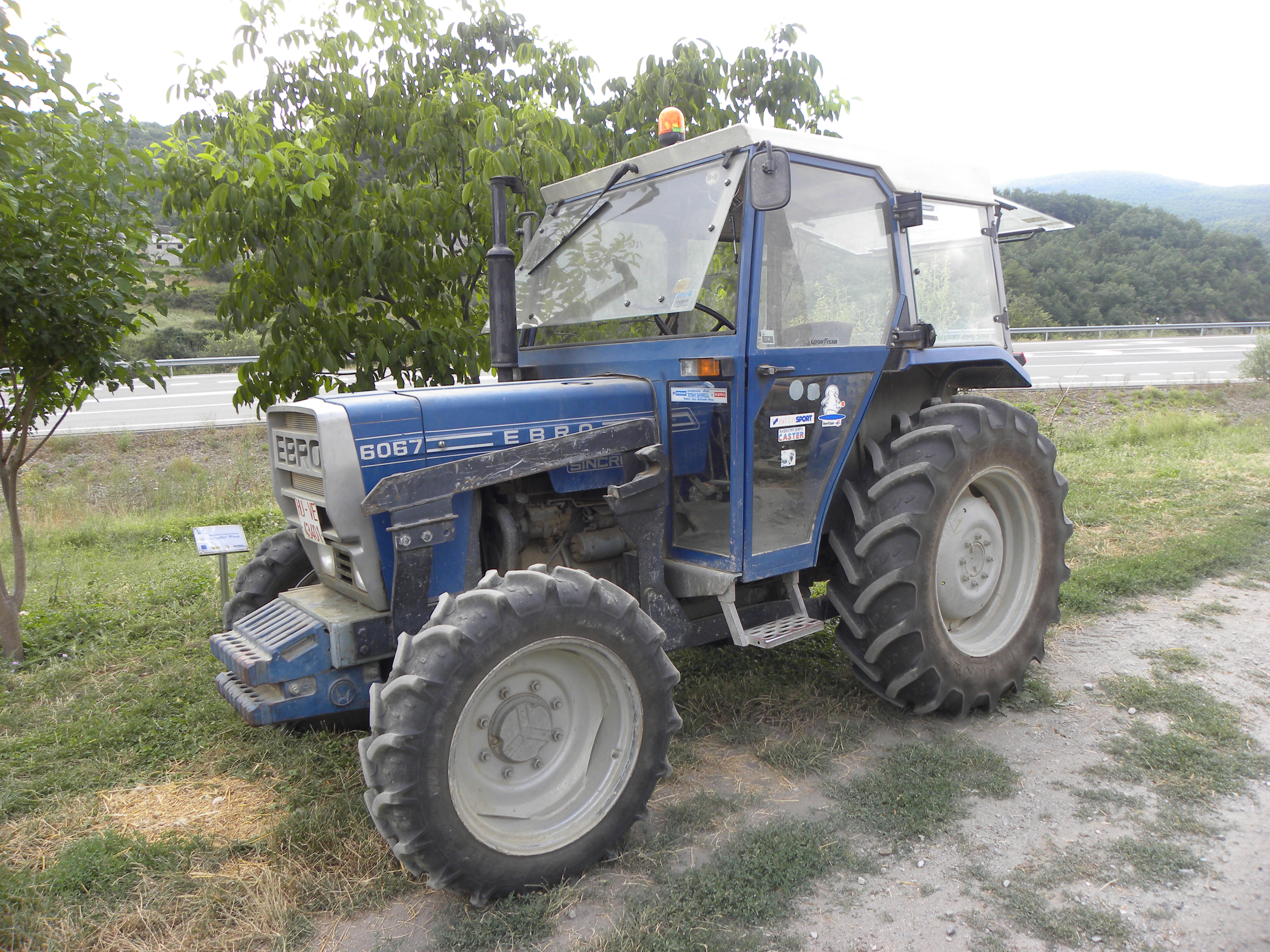
Ebro 6067 tractor

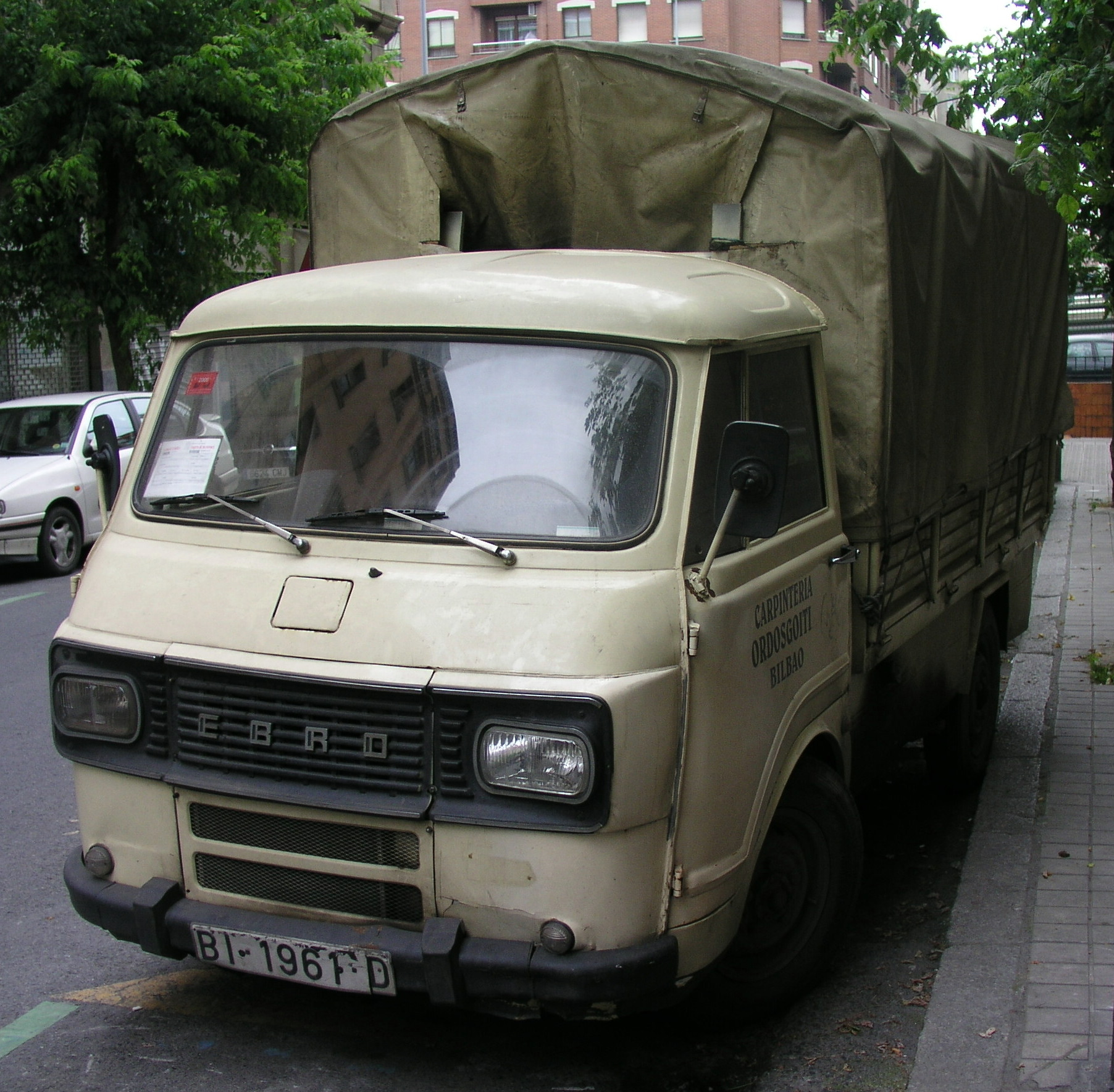
EBRO F-108

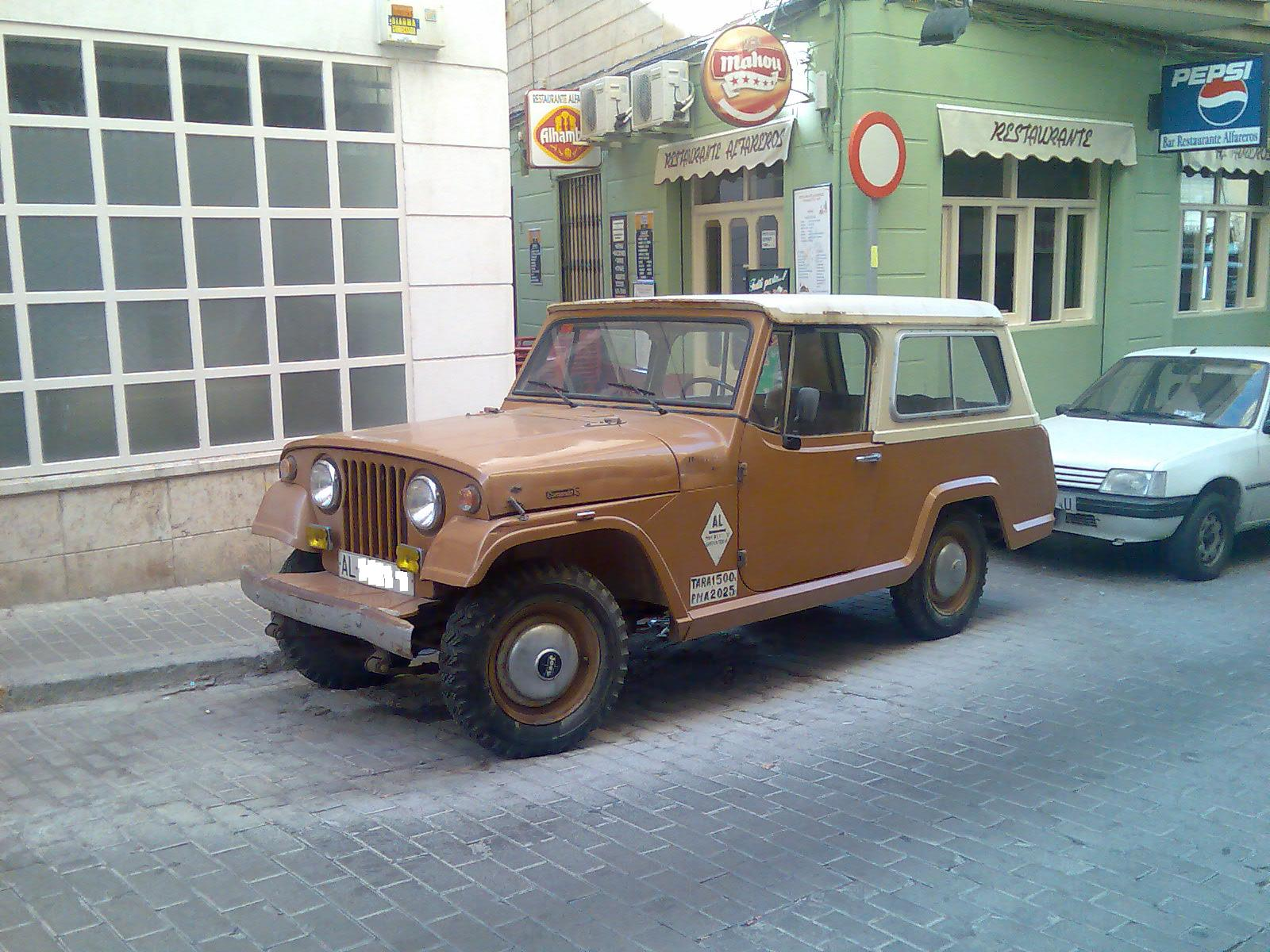
Ebro Jeep Comando

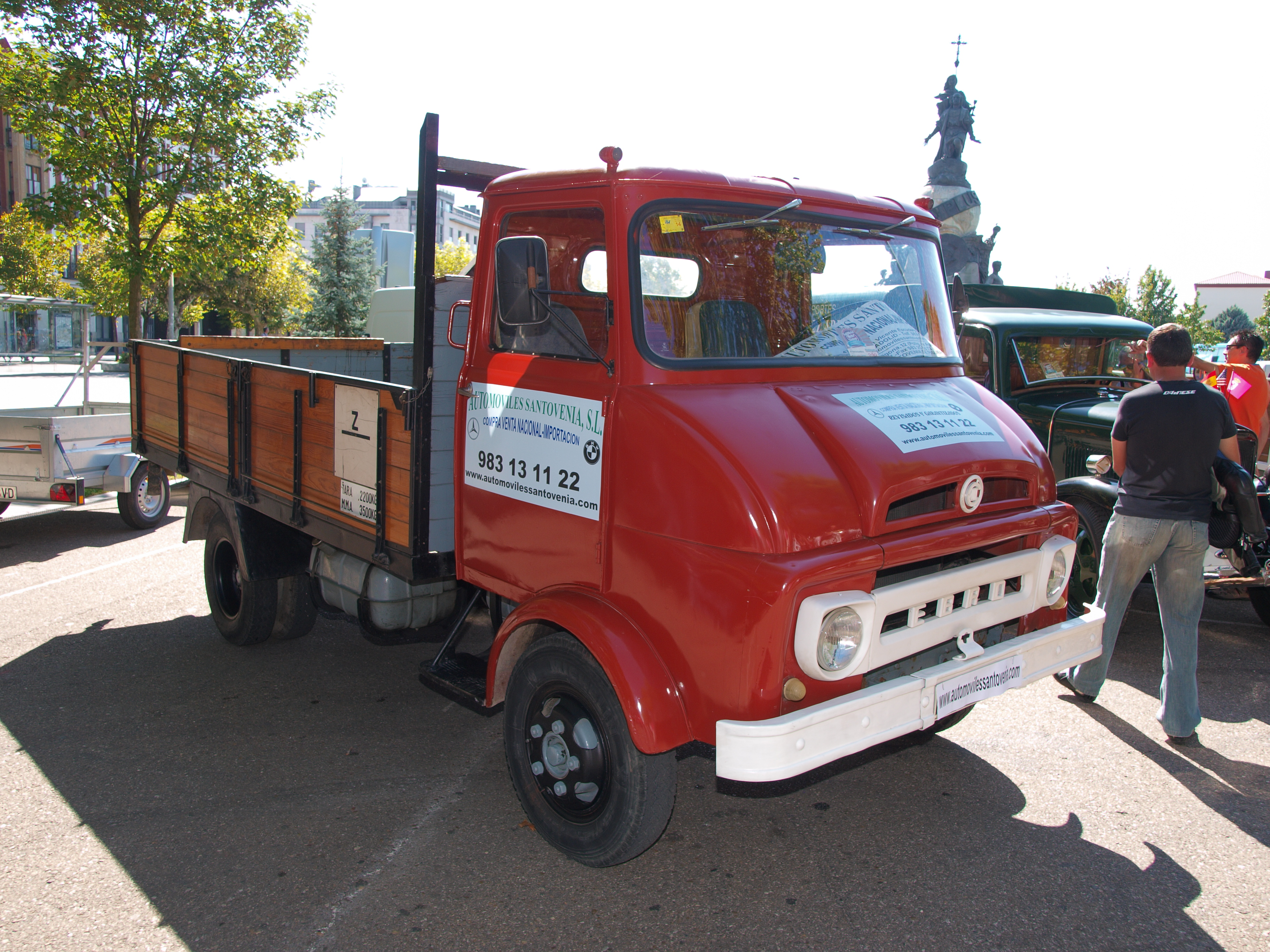
Ebro C-153 truck
